= Panneerselvam =

- Language: Tamil

Origin
- Origin: Tamil Nadu
- Region of origin: India

Panneerselvam is a common name in India.

Panneerselvam

- O. Panneerselvam, Former Chief Minister of Tamil Nadu
- M. R. K. Panneerselvam, Kurinjipadi MLA
- M. Panneerselvam, former Ambur MLA
- M. Panneerselvam, incumbent Sirkazhi MLA
- A. T. Pannirselvam, Indian politician

Pannir Selvam

- Pannir Selvam Pranthaman, Malaysian drug trafficker sentenced to death in Singapore
- Sir A T Pannir Selvam, Indian politician
