= Sirkazhi =

- Town in Mayiladuthurai district
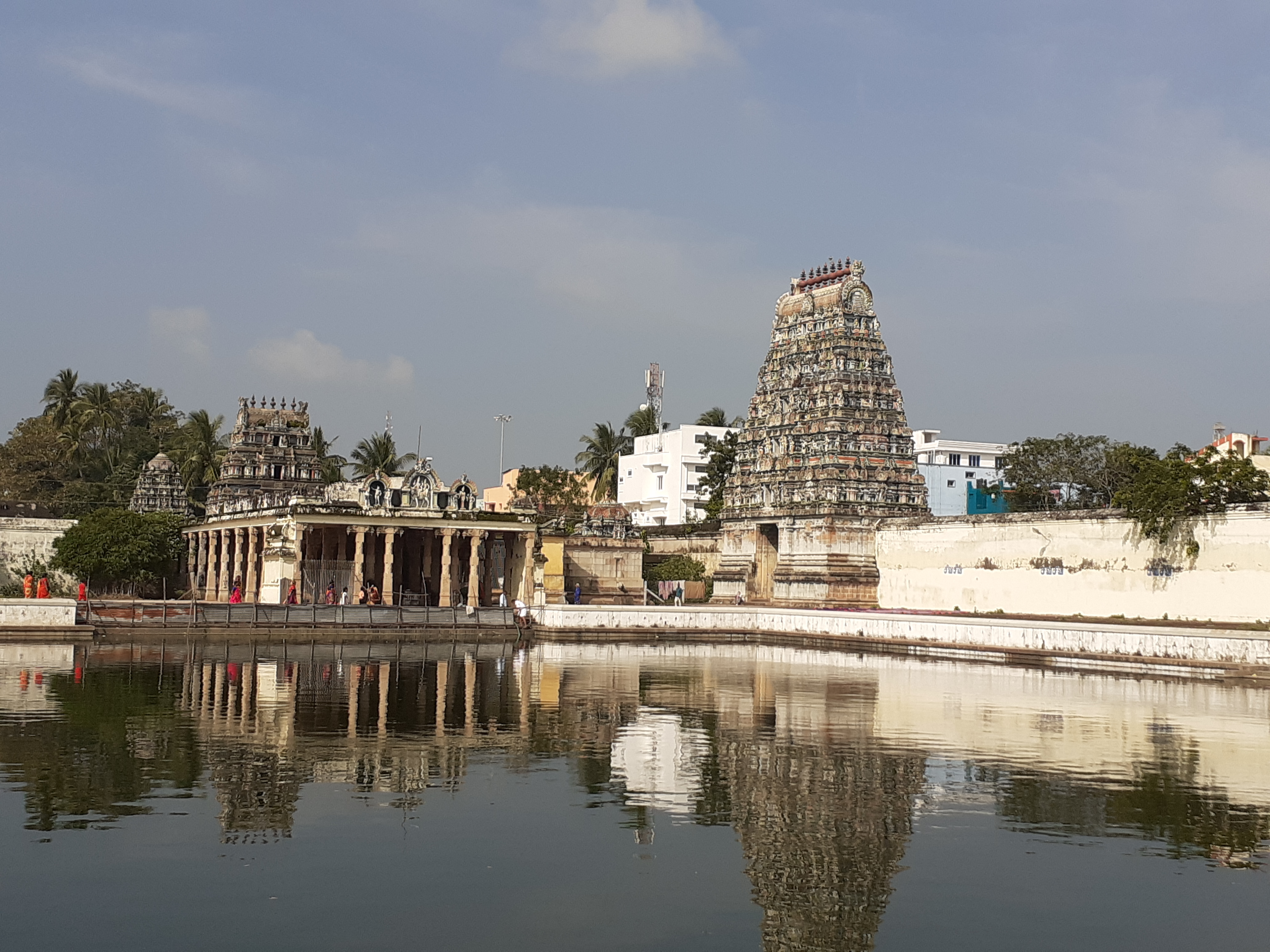
- A view of temple tower of Sattainathar Temple located in the centre of the town

- Location in Tamil Nadu, India
- Coordinates: 11.239°N 79.736°E
- Country: India
- State: Tamil Nadu
- Region: Chola Nadu
- District: Mayiladuthurai

Government
  - Municipal Chairman: Vacant

Area
  - Total: 13.21 km^{2} (5.10 sq mi)
- Elevation: 4 m (13 ft)

Population (2011)
  - Total: 34,927
  - Density: 2,644/km^{2} (6,848/sq mi)

Languages
  - Official: Tamil
- Time zone: UTC+5:30 (IST)
- PIN: 609110
- Telephone code: (91) 4364
- Vehicle registration: TN-82-Z
- Nearest town: Mayiladuthurai, Chidambaram

Sirkazhi ([ˈsiːɾkaːɻiː]), also spelled as Sirkali and Siyali, is a selection grade municipal town in Mayiladuthurai district in Tamil Nadu, India. It is located 13 km (8 mi) from the coast of the Bay of Bengal, and 250 km (160 mi) from the state capital Chennai. Sirkazhi was a part of Thanjavur district until 1991, later becoming part of Nagapattinam district until 2020 and has since been part of Mayiladuthurai district. The town covers an area of 13.21 km^{2} (5.10 sq mi) and in 2011 had a population of 34,927. It is administered by a second grade municipality. Sirkazhi is part of the Cauvery delta region and agriculture is the major occupation. Roads are the main means of transportation; the town has 51.47 km (31.98 mi) of district roads, including a national highway.

The town is believed to be of significant antiquity and has been ruled by the Medieval Cholas, Later Cholas, Later Pandyas, the Vijayanagar Empire, the Marathas and the British. The Tamil trinity of Carnatic music; Arunachala Kavirayar (1711–78), Muthu Thandavar (1525–1600) and Marimutthu Pillai (1712–87), originated from Sirkazhi. The Saiva saint Tirugnanasambandar, foremost of the Saiva Nayanars, was born here in the seventh century. Thirumangai Alvar Kaliyan (Thirumangai) was born in Thirukuraiyalur near Sirkazhi. The history of the town is centred on the Sattainathar Temple, which is dedicated to the Hindu god Shiva. The history of the town is also associated with Rajarajeshwari – Angalaparameshwari Temple, which is dedicated to the goddess Adi shakti, who is believed to be most powerful form, located in the south of Kalumalaiyar river. When the goddess takes on the forceful form, she is known as "Shri Kali" or "Pechi amma" or " Angali" which forms the basis for the town's name as "Sirkali".

== Etymology and origin ==
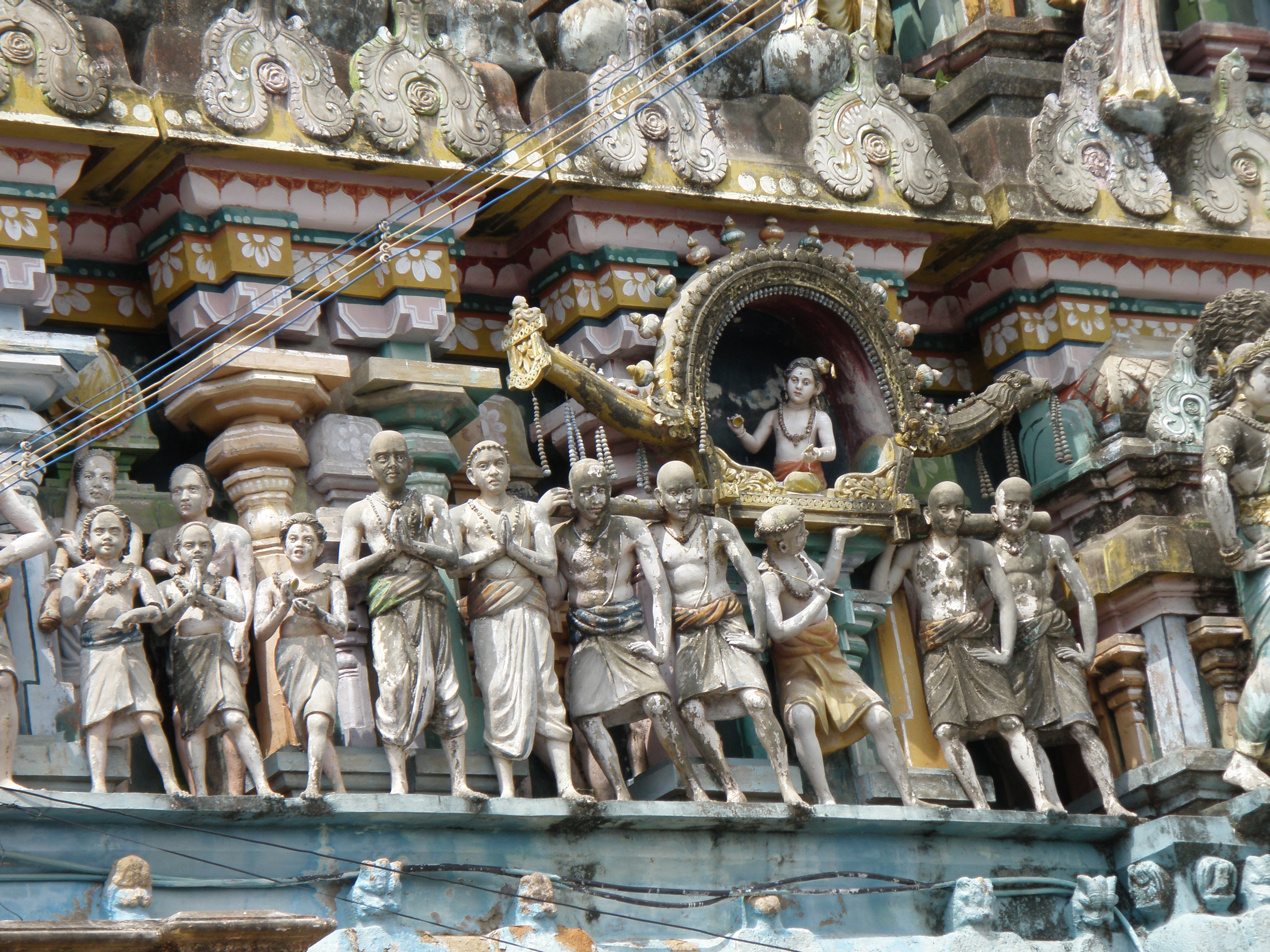
A temple relief depicting Appar bearing Sambandar's palanquin

In ancient times, this town had twelve different names, including Brahmapuram, Venupuram, Thonipuram, Kazhumalam, Pugali, Sirkazhiswaram Shri Kali and Kazheesirama Vinnagaram. According to Hindu legend, during one of the biggest deluges that submerged the planet earth, Hindu god Shiva is said to have carried the 64 arts on a raft (called Thoni in Tamil). The presiding deity in the temple, Shiva, is thus called "Thoniappar" (the one who carried the raft) and the region is called "Thonipuram". The Hindu god Brahma is believed to have worshiped Shiva here, giving the name "Bhrahmapureeswarar" (the one worshipped by Brahma) and so the region is also referred as "Brahmapureeswaram".

Shiva is believed to have quelled the arrogance of Hindu god Brahma, after showing his dominance over the three worlds and hence got the name "Sattainathar" here. The town is thus called "Sattainathapuram", which in modern times, is a suburb within Sirkazhi. The town was known as "Kalumalam" during the early Chola period. Thirugnanasambandar, the seventh century Saiva nayanar, as an infant is believed to have been fed with the milk of wisdom by the divine mother Parvati on the banks of the temple tank. The child Sambandar started singing the anthology of Tevaram hymns from then on, commencing with "Todudaiya Seviyan". Sambandar refers the town as "Kazhi" in his verses. It was called Shiyali during British rule, and after Independence, it was renamed "Sirkazhi".

== History ==
The earliest mention of Sirkazhi is found in the history of the Chola king Kocengannan from the Sangam Age (3rd century BCE to 4th century CE), who is believed to have won a bloody battle here. During the 7th–8th century, there were widespread disputes between the Hindu sects of Saivism and Vaishnavism. Tirugnanasambandar and Thirumangai Alvar, belonging to Saivism and Vaishnavism, respectively, and both natives of Sirkazhi, had disputes over their religious compositions and theologies during the period. The Chola Kings ruled over the region for more than four centuries, from 850 to 1280, and were temple patrons. There are 41 inscriptions from the Chola kings in the temple that record various gifts like land, sheep, cow and oil to the temple.

The region fell under the control of Pandyas in 1532 and later became part of the Thanjavur Nayak kingdom. The region was conquered in 1674 by Ekoji I (1675–84), the Maratha enemy of the Nawab of Bijapur and half-brother of Shivaji (1674–80). The town and the region became part of the British East India Company during the mid-18th century. Tanjore district was constituted in 1799 when the Thanjavur Maratha ruler Serfoji II (1798–1832) ceded most of his kingdom to the British East India Company in return for his restitution on the throne. After India's independence, Sirkazhi continued to be a part of Thanjavur district until 1991, when it became part of Nagapattinam district until March 2020. Currently Sirkazhi is part of the newly created Mayiladuthurai district.

== Geography ==
Sirkazhi is located at 11.23°N 79.73°E, on the eastern flank of the Kumbakonam-Shiyali ridge, which runs along the Kollidam River. Sirkazhi has an average elevation of 5.18 m (17.0 ft) above sea level and is located at 13 km (8.1 mi) west of Bay of Bengal. It is located 95 km (59 mi) north-east of Thanjavur, 24 km (15 mi) north of Mayiladuthurai and 20 kilometres (12 mi) south of Chidambaram.

The town experiences long summers and short winters,and receives an average yearly rainfall of 1,250 mm (49 in), mainly from the north-east monsoon between October and December. Its close proximity to the sea means that Sirkazhi receives more rainfall than neighbouring towns. Sirkazhi is part of the Cauvery delta region and has irrigation channels, called the Kollidam channels, which carry water from the rivers and provide a rich deposit of fertile silt before reaching the sea. The soil is black and contains fertile alluvial sediment. The area's main crop is rice; other crops grown in the area are coconut, tamarind and neem. The landscape mostly consists of plain lands with fields and small portions of scrub jungle. Antelope, spotted deer, wild hog, jackal and fox are present in the jungles and outlying areas of the town. Crow and ordinary game birds are found in large numbers in the town.

The 2004 Indian Ocean earthquake was an undersea, megathrust earthquake that occurred on 26 December 2004, with an epicentre off the west coast of Sumatra, Indonesia, triggering a series of devastating tsunamis along coastal fringes of the Indian Ocean. Nagapattinam district was the most affected part of Tamil Nadu, accounting for 6,064 off the 8,009 casualties in the state. Sirkazhi remained mostly unaffected by the tsunami, but the groundwater quality deteriorated where aquifers were close to the water bodies. There was heavy salt water intrusion inland.

== Demographics ==
Religious census
Religion	Percent(%)
Hindu	86.91%
Muslim	9.46%
Christian	2.16%
Sikh	0.02%
Buddhist	0.46%
Jain	0.33%
Other	0.63%
No religion	0.04%

Historical population
Year	Pop.	±%
1961	19,531	—
1971	22,711	+16.3%
1981	25,508	+12.3%
1991	28,959	+13.5%
2001	32,228	+11.3%
2011	34,927	+8.4%
Sources: 1961 – 1971; 1981 – 2001: 2011:

According to 2011 census, Sirkali had a population of 34,927 with a sex-ratio of 1,028 females for every 1,000 males, much above the national average of 929. A total of 3,367 were under the age of six, constituting 1,740 males and 1,627 females. Scheduled Castes and Scheduled Tribes accounted for 23.21% and 0.13% of the population respectively. The average literacy of the town was 81.5%, compared to the national average of 72.99%. The town had a total of 8,756 households. There were a total of 11,476 workers, comprising 352 cultivators, 1,398 main agricultural labourers, 150 in house hold industries, 7,681 other workers, 1,895 marginal workers, 88 marginal cultivators, 809 marginal agricultural labourers, 77 marginal workers in household industries and 921 other marginal workers.

As per the religious census of 2011, Sirkazhi had 86.91% Hindus, 9.46% Muslims, 2.16% Christians, 0.02% Sikhs, 0.46% Buddhists, 0.33% Jains, 0.63% following other religions and 0.04% following no religion or did not indicate any religious preference.

In 1981, there were 15 notified slums accommodating 4,499 persons, constituting 17.64% of the population. In 2001, there were still 15 slums accommodating 7,533 persons, constituting 23.37% of the population. The slum area has remained static at 39.45 acres (0.1596 km^{2}). The town has a residential area of 2.79 km^{2} (1.08 sq mi) (20.96%), commercial area of 0.4 km^{2} (0.15 sq mi) (3.04%), industrial area of 0.58 km^{2} (0.22 sq mi) (4.39%), public & semi public area of 1.29 km^{2} (0.50 sq mi) (9.66%) and undeveloped area of 8.23 km^{2} (3.18 sq mi) (38.05%).

== Economy and transport ==
The service sector provides most employment in the town. Limited agriculture is carried out; the main crop is paddy rice. During the British Raj, Sirkazhi was known for mats made with a kind of cyperus. The headquarters of the taluka and panchayat union administration, and many government offices are located in the town. There are no major industries within the town, except for several rice mills. Sirkazhi has many Hindu temples, which draw in tourism activity. Sirkali Coop Urban Bank, founded on 23 April 1918 is the oldest bank in Sirkali. All major nationalised banks and private banks have branches in the town, and all have atms.

The National highway NH-32 connects Chennai and Thoothukudi through Chidambaram, Cuddalore and Nagapattinam passes through Sirkazhi. Sirkazhi has outer bypass road to ease the transport of heavy vehicles in the town. Sirkazhi municipality has 51.5 km (32.0 mi) of roads: 18.3 km (11.4 mi) of BT roads, 30.4 km (18.9 mi) of cement roads, 2.2 km (1.4 mi) of water-bound macadam surface and 0.6 km (0.37 mi) of other roads. Bullock carts are the traditional mode of transport; as late as the 1950s, landlords and rich farmers travelled mostly by bullock carts except on rare, long journeys, which they undertook by buses or motor vehicles. Buses are the main mode of public transport from Sirkazhi. The municipality operates a B-Class bus stand with 36 bays that accommodate local and intercity buses. The buses are operated by Tamil Nadu State Transport Corporation, connecting the town to Mayiladuthurai, Kumbakonam, Nagapattinam, Chidambaram, Karaikkal and other cities in Tamil Nadu.

Nearest major junction of Mayiladuthurai, the Sirkazhi's railway station is on the main line between Chennai and Trichy via Cuddalore and Chidambaram. Daily express trains connect major cities in Tamil Nadu like Chennai, Madurai and Trichy, and weekly express trains connect Tirupathi, Varanasi, Tiruchendur and Bhubaneswar. There are also daily passenger trains to Mayiladuthurai, Salem, Villupuram and Bangalore daily. The nearest airport is Tiruchirapalli Airport which is 160 km (99 mi) from Sirkazhi.

== Education and utility services ==
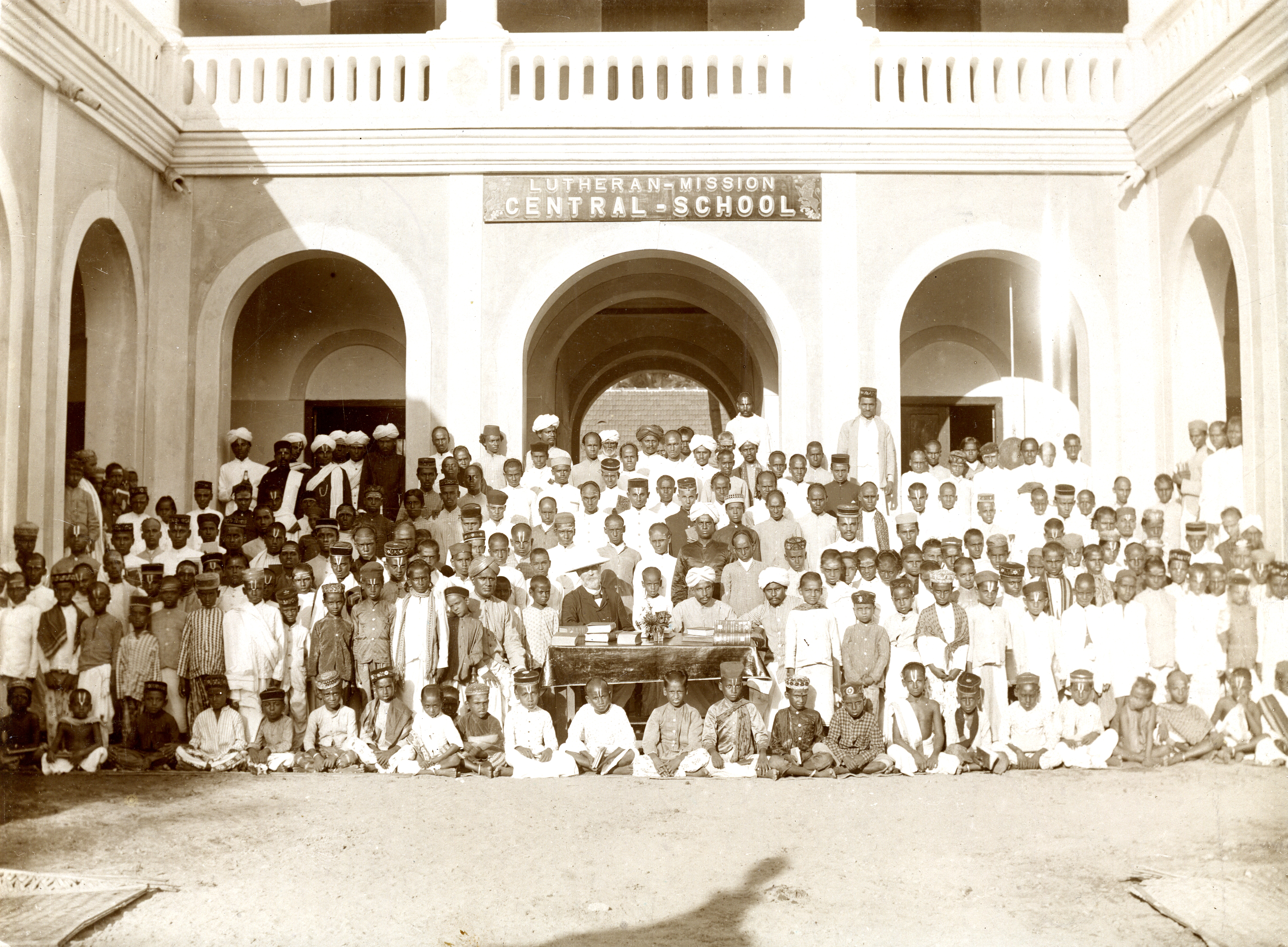
Opening ceremony 1896 of the Lutheran Mission Central-School in Sirkazhi

The first English school in the town was the Leipzig Evangelical Lutheran Mission School, which was opened by the Lutheran Mission in 1896. The Lutheran mission was the earliest Protestant mission founded in Tanjore (present-day Thajavur) by Rev. C.V. Schwartz in 1778 to promote Christian knowledge in the region. Of the 32 schools in Sirkazhi, there are nine municipal schools. There are three higher secondary schools, three middle schools, fourteen primary schools and three matriculation schools in the town. There are two arts and science colleges, BEST College of Arts and Science and Vivekananda College of Arts and Science. Srinivasa Subbaraya Polytechnic College (locally called Puttur Polytechnic) is located in Puttur, 7 kilometres (4.3 mi) from Sirkali.

Electricity supply to the town is regulated and distributed by the Sirkazhi Circle of Tamil Nadu Electricity Board (TNEB). Water supply is provided by the Sirkazhi municipality from the Kollidam river; it is distributed through five water tanks which supply 2 million (two million) litres a day. Push carts and tricycles are used to collect solid waste, which is deposited in marsh lands located outside the town. Sirkazhi municipality is implementing underground drainage and the current sewerage system is through septic tanks and public conveniences. Roadside drains carry away untreated sewage, which is released into the sea or accumulates in low-lying areas.

Sirkazhi comes under the Sirkazhi Telecom Circle of the Bharat Sanchar Nigam Limited (BSNL), India's state-owned telephone and internet services provider. BSNL also provides a broadband internet service The town has a government hospital, 12 private hospitals, clinics and medical shops.

== Municipal administration and politics ==
Municipality Officials
Chairman	J. Eraiezhil
Commissioner	S. Maharajan
Vice-chairman	K. Tamilselvam
Elected Members
Member of Legislative Assembly	R. Senthilselvan
Member of Parliament	Sudha Ramakrishnan

During the British Raj, Shiyali (present-day Sirkazhi) was the headquarters of a separate administrative division, or taluka. In 1972 the town was declared a third grade municipality, and was upgraded to a second grade municipality in 1980. The municipality has 24 wards, each of which has an elected councillor. The functions of the municipality are devolved into six departments: general administration/personnel, engineering, revenue, public health, town planning and IT, which are controlled by a Municipal Commissioner, who is the supreme executive head. Legislative powers are vested in a body of 24 members, one for each of the 24 wards. The legislative body is headed by an elected chairperson, who is assisted by a deputy. On the revenue administration side, Sirkazhi is a taluka headquarters having three revenue villages: Kavilancheri, Sirkazhi and Thadalan.

For the purposes of state government, Sirkazhi is part of the Sirkazhi assembly constituency, which elects a member to the Tamil Nadu Legislative Assembly once every five years. The constituency is reserved for Scheduled Caste (SC) candidates. Since 2011 the MLA of the constituency is M. Sakthi from the ADMK.

In the national parliament, Sirkazhi is a part of the Mayiladuthurai (Lok Sabha constituency).

Law and order in Sirkazhi is maintained by the Mayiladuthurai sub-division of the Tamil Nadu Police, headed by a Deputy Superintendent of Police. There is a police station in the town. There are special units like prohibition enforcement, district crime, social justice and human rights, district crime records and special branch that operate at the district level police division, headed by a Superintendent of Police.

== Culture ==
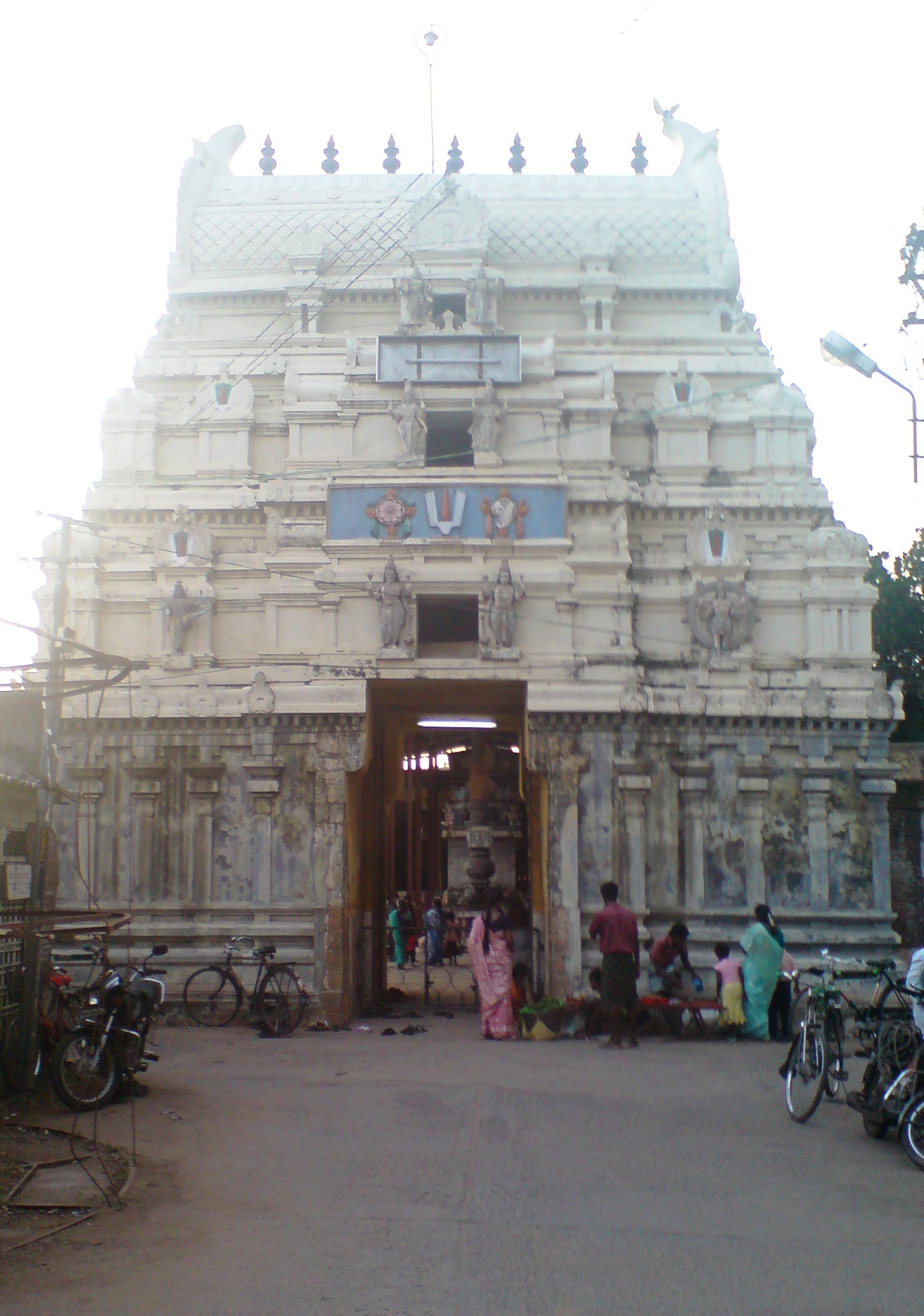
Gopuram of Kazheesirama Vinnagaram

The Bhramapureeswarar temple, also called Sattainathar temple, is an ancient temple complex dedicated to Shiva, and has three Shiva shrines. The temple is mentioned in the Saiva canonical work, Tevaram, by Thirugnana Sambanthar, Tirunavukkarasar and Sundarar, the foremost Saivite saints of 7th–8th century CE and is classified as Paadal Petra Sthalam. There is a separate shrine for Sambandar celebrating the miracle of Parvathi suckling the child Sambandar when he was crying for milk. Shiva is worshipped in three different forms; the Shivalingam (Bhrammapureeswarar), Uma Maheswarar (Toniappar) at the middle level, and Bhairavar (Sattanathar) at the upper level. The original temple was enlarged during the period of Kulothunga Chola I, Vikrama Chola, Kulothunga Chola II and Kulothunga Chola III (as in Chidambaram – 11th through the 13th centuries). Every year in the Tamil month of Chithirai (April – May), a 10-day festival is celebrated.

Kazheesirama Vinnagaram temple, also called Thadalan Koil, is dedicated to Vishnu in the form of Trivikrama. Sirkazhi is base to the outlying places like Poompuhar, and the temples Thirusaikkadu, Thiruppallavaneeswaram, Melapperumpallam, Keezhaperumpallam, Thiruvengadu and Thirunangur. Thirukkavalampadi, Thiruvanpurushothamam, Thiruarimeya Vinnagaram, Thiruchsemponsey, Thirumanimadam, Thiruvaikunda vinnagaram, Thiruthevanartthogai, Thiruthetriyambalam, Thirumanikkoodam, Annan Koil and Thiruppaarththanpalli are eleven Vishnu temples, called Nangur Divya Desams revered in Nalayira Divya Prabandham, located in the outskirts of Sirkazhi. The annual Garudasevai festival held during January attracts thousands of pilgrims.

Tamil Isai Moovar (meaning Tamil trinity of Carnatic music) namely, Arunachala Kavirayar (1711–1778), Muthu Thandavar (1525–1600) and Marimutthu Pillai (1712–1787) originated from Sirkazhi. A memorial hall was constructed in honor of the Tamil Isai Moovar, in Sirkazhi. Arunachala composed devotional songs, including Sirkazhi Sthalapuranam and Sirkazhi Kovai, eulogising the town. S. R. Ranganathan, considered to be the father of library science in India, is from Sirkazhi. Padma Shri Sirkazhi Govindarajan, a leading vocalist in Carnatic Music and a playback singer for Tamil cinema and devotional songs was also born in Sirkazhi.

== See also ==
- Erukkur
- Chindhaaththirai Matha Shrine, Erukkur

== Notes ==
- The municipalities in Tamil Nadu are graded special, selection, grade I and grade II based on income and population. While "grade II" is the official classification, all the municipal websites use "second grade".
- The census details of small towns for 2011 are yet to be published in census website. The municipal website provides the totals alone.
