= R. Balasubramani =

Indian politician

Member of the Tamil Nadu Legislative Assembly
- In office 2016–2019
- Constituency: Ambur

Personal details
- Party: All India Anna Dravida Munnetra Kazhagam

R. Balasubramani was an Indian politician and former Member of the Legislative Assembly of Tamil Nadu. He was elected to the Tamil Nadu legislative assembly as an All India Anna Dravida Munnetra Kazhagam candidate from Ambur constituency in the 2016.

He was one of the 18 members who were disqualified were disqualified by Speaker P. Dhanapal as they withdrew support to Chief Minister Edappadi K. Palaniswami and became loyal to rebel leader T.T.V. Dhinakaran and joined his party Amma Makkal Munnetra Kazhagam.

== Electoral performance ==
Election	Constituency	Political party	Result	Vote %	Opposition			Ref
Election	Constituency	Political party	Result	Vote %	Candidate	Political party	Vote %	Ref
2016	Ambur	AIADMK	Won	49.16%	V. R. Nazeer Ahmed	MNMK	31.77%	
2019 by-election	Ambur	Independent	Lost	5.21%	A. C. Vilwanathan	DMK	56.79%	
