= Veerangkuppam =

Veerangkuppam Veerangkuppam Thalavetti Veerangkuppam
- village
- Country: India
- State: Tamil Nadu
- District: Tirupattur
- Talukas: Ambur

Languages
  - Official: Tamil
- Time zone: UTC+5:30 (IST)
- PIN: 635802
- Nearest city: vellore
- Vidhan Sabha constituency: Ambur

Veerangkuppam is a small village in Ambur Taluk, part of the Tirupattur District in the Indian State of Tamil Nadu. This village is surrounded by coconut tree farms, and the Palar river. The village's population is approximately 3000.

== Schools in Veerangkuppam ==
- Aided middle school.
- M.J.R Matriculation School.
