= R. Senthilselvan =

Indian politician (born 1968)

Member of the Tamil Nadu Legislative Assembly
- Incumbent
- Assumed office 11 May 2026
- Preceded by: M. Pannerselvam
- Constituency: Sirkazhi

Personal details
- Party: Dravida Munnetra Kazhagam
- Other political affiliations: Marumalarchi Dravida Munnetra Kazhagam

Rajangam Senthilselvan (born 1968) is an Indian politician from Tamil Nadu. He is a member of the Tamil Nadu Legislative Assembly from the Sirkazhi Assembly constituency, which is reserved for Scheduled Caste community, in the erstwhile Nagapattinam district, presently in Mayiladuthurai district, representing the Dravida Munnetra Kazhagam.

== Early life and education ==
Senthilselvan is from Sirkazhi, Mayiladuthurai district, Tamil Nadu. He is the son of P Rajangam. He completed his MA at Annamalai University in 1999 and did his Diploma in Criminology and Froensic Science at University of Madras in 2000. He is an advocate and his wife is a nurse. He declared his assets worth Rs.1 crore in his affidavit to the Election Commission of India.

== Career ==
Senthilselvan won the Sirkazhi Assembly constituency representing the Dravida Munnetra Kazhagam in the 2026 Tamil Nadu Legislative Assembly election. He polled 71,449 votes and defeated his nearest rival, M. Sakthi of the All India Anna Dravida Munnetra Kazhagam, by a margin of 11,417 votes.
