= P. Rajagopal =

P. Rajagopal may refer to:

- P. Rajagopal (businessman) (1947-2019), founder of Saravana Bhavan chain of restaurants
- P. Rajagopal (Ambur MLA), Indian politician and former Member of the Legislative Assembly of Tamil Nadu
