= Manapparai Assembly constituency =

State legislative assembly constituency in Tamil Nadu, India

Coordinates: 10.60759°N 78.414874°E

Manapparai
- Constituency No. 138 for the Tamil Nadu Legislative Assembly

Constituency details
- Country: India
- Region: South India
- State: Tamil Nadu
- District: Tiruchirappalli
- Lok Sabha constituency: Karur
- Established: 2008
- Total electors: 2,68,165
- Reservation: None

Member of Legislative Assembly
- 17th Tamil Nadu Legislative Assembly
- Incumbent R.Kathiravan
- Party: TVK
- Elected year: 2026

Manapparai is a state assembly constituency in Tiruchirappalli district of Tamil Nadu, India newly formed after the constituency delimitation in 2008. Its State Assembly Constituency number is 138. It is included in Karur Lok Sabha constituency for Lok Sabha elections. It is one of the 234 State Legislative Assembly Constituencies in Tamil Nadu.

== Members of Legislative Assembly ==
Year	Winner	Party
2011	R. Chandrasekar	All India Anna Dravida Munnetra Kazhagam
2016	R. Chandrasekar	All India Anna Dravida Munnetra Kazhagam
2021	P. Abdul Samad	Manithaneya Makkal Katchi
2026	R. Kathiravan	Tamilaga Vettri Kazhagam

== Election results ==
Vote share of winning candidates
2026	34.43%
2021	44.43%
2016	44.38%
2011	46.77%
1962	42.54%
1957	55.22%
1952	41.10%

=== 2026 ===
2026 Tamil Nadu Legislative Assembly election: Manapparai
Party	Candidate	Votes	%	±%
TVK	R. Kathiravan	83,041	34.43	New
AIADMK	Dr. PL. Vijayakumar	81,615	33.83	▼5.05
DMK	P. Abdul Samed	61,355	25.44	New
NTK	M. Arunagiri	10,070	4.17	▼4.64
NOTA	NOTA	949	0.39	▼0.07
Samaniya Makkal Nala Katchi	Arockiaraj.A	721	0.30	New
Independent	P. Vijayakumar	595	0.25	New
Independent	Rajesh.M	554	0.23	New
Independent	Sarphudin	333	0.14	New
PT	P. Meena	275	0.11	New
Independent	M. Karuppan	274	0.11	New
Independent	A. Senthil Kumar	272	0.11	New
Independent	Periyakka	238	0.10	New
Independent	P. Chinnan	183	0.08	New
Independent	Kathiravan.M	180	0.07	New
Independent	M. Vijaya Kumar	173	0.07	New
TVK	Rajavarman.R	155	0.06	New
Independent	Kuttaian	126	0.05	New
Margin of victory		1,426	0.60	▼4.95
Turnout		2,41,216	89.95	▲13.76
Registered electors		2,68,165		▼21,548
TVK gain from MNMK		Swing	▲34.43	

=== 2021 ===
2021 Tamil Nadu Legislative Assembly election: Manapaarai
Party	Candidate	Votes	%	±%
MNMK	P. Abdul Samad	98,077	44.43%	New
AIADMK	R. Chandrasekar	85,834	38.88%	−5.49
NTK	P. Kanimozhi	19,450	8.81%	+7.91
DMDK	P. Krishnagopal	10,719	4.86%	−7.92
Independent	V. Chandrasekar	1,259	0.57%	New
NOTA	NOTA	1,009	0.46%	−1.18
Margin of victory		12,243	5.55%	−3.33%
Turnout		220,739	76.19%	−2.29%
Rejected ballots		330	0.15%	
Registered electors		289,713		
MNMK gain from AIADMK		Swing	0.05%	

=== 2016 ===
2016 Tamil Nadu Legislative Assembly election: Manapaarai
Party	Candidate	Votes	%	±%
AIADMK	R. Chandrasekar	91,399	44.38%	−2.39
IUML	M. A. Mohamed Nizam	73,122	35.50%	New
DMDK	P. Krishna Gopal	26,316	12.78%	New
BJP	C. Senthil Deepak	4,154	2.02%	+0.52
NOTA	NOTA	3,364	1.63%	New
Independent	J. Mohaideen Basha	2,392	1.16%	New
NTK	M. Arunagiri	1,849	0.90%	New
Margin of victory		18,277	8.87%	−7.46%
Turnout		205,956	78.48%	−1.56%
Registered electors		262,415		
AIADMK hold		Swing	-2.39%	

=== 2011 ===
2011 Tamil Nadu Legislative Assembly election: Manapaarai
Party	Candidate	Votes	%	±%
AIADMK	R. Chandrasekar	81,020	46.77%	New
Independent	K. Ponnusamy	52,721	30.43%	New
INC	Subbha Somu	26,629	15.37%	New
Independent	Y. Vincent De Paul	3,523	2.03%	New
BJP	C. Senthil Deepak	2,589	1.49%	New
Independent	C. Samirasu	2,237	1.29%	New
Independent	A. Martin Jegatheesan	1,126	0.65%	New
Margin of victory		28,299	16.33%	
Turnout		216,436	80.05%	
Registered electors		173,248		
AIADMK win (new seat)				

=== 1962 ===
1962 Madras Legislative Assembly election: Manapaarai
Party	Candidate	Votes	%	±%
INC	N. P. M. Chinnaya Kavundar	24,048	42.54%	−12.68
DMK	S. Annavi	19,412	34.34%	New
SWA	M. Nallathambi Gounder	8,044	14.23%	New
CPI	R. V. Ponnuswamy Reddiar	3,992	7.06%	New
Independent	A. R. O. A. R. Arumugham Pillai	689	1.22%	New
Independent	S. Muthiah	345	0.61%	New
Margin of victory		4,636	8.20%	−30.63%
Turnout		56,530	60.60%	23.64%
Registered electors		98,431		
INC hold		Swing	-12.68%	

=== 1957 ===
1957 Madras Legislative Assembly election: Manapaarai
Party	Candidate	Votes	%	±%
INC	N. P. M. Chinnaya Kavundar	18,488	55.22%	+14.12
Independent	A. Rajagopal Pillai	5,487	16.39%	New
Independent	Pl. V. Valmiki Kavundar	5,416	16.18%	New
Independent	Ar. O. Ar. Armugam Pillai	4,088	12.21%	New
Margin of victory		13,001	38.83%	26.22%
Turnout		33,479	36.96%	−17.45%
Registered electors		90,585		
INC hold		Swing	14.12%	

=== 1952 ===
1952 Madras Legislative Assembly election: Manapaarai
Party	Candidate	Votes	%	±%
INC	Antony Peter	14,773	41.10%	New
Independent	Kulandalvel	10,240	28.49%	New
Independent	Chinnayya Gounder	8,532	23.74%	New
Independent	Thirumalaiswamy	1,223	3.40%	New
Independent	Ramaswami Servai	1,174	3.27%	New
Margin of victory		4,533	12.61%	
Turnout		35,942	54.41%	
Registered electors		66,062		
INC win (new seat)				
