= Vaniyambadi Assembly constituency =

State Legislative Assembly Constituency in Tamil Nadu

Coordinates: 12.68°N 78.62°E

Vaniyambadi
- Constituency No. 47 for the Tamil Nadu Legislative Assembly

Constituency details
- Country: India
- Region: South India
- State: Tamil Nadu
- District: Tirupathur
- Lok Sabha constituency: Vellore
- Established: 1951
- Total electors: 2,43,320

Member of Legislative Assembly
- 17th Tamil Nadu Legislative Assembly
- Incumbent Syed Farooq Basha
- Party: IUML
- Alliance: SSJVA
- Elected year: 2026

Vaniyambadi is a legislative assembly constituency in Tirupathur district in the Indian state of Tamil Nadu. Its State Assembly Constituency number is 47. It consists of a portion of Vaniyambadi taluk. It falls under Vellore Lok Sabha constituency. It is one of the 234 State Legislative Assembly Constituencies in Tamil Nadu, in India. Elections and winners in the constituency are listed below.

== Members of Legislative Assembly ==
Year	Member	Political party
Madras State
1952	A. K. Hanumantharaya Gounder	Independent
1957	A. A. Rasheed	Indian National Congress
1962	M. P. Vadivel	Dravida Munnetra Kazhagam
1967	Rajamannar	Indian National Congress
Tamil Nadu
1971	M. Abdul Lathief	Independent
1977	M. Abdul Lathief	Independent
1980	N. Kulasekara Pandian	All India Anna Dravida Munnetra Kazhagam
1984	H. Abdul Majeed	Indian National Congress
1989	P. Abdul Samad	Dravida Munnetra Kazhagam
1991	E. Sampath	Indian National Congress
1996	M. Abdul Lathief	Dravida Munnetra Kazhagam
2001	M. Abdul Lathief	Independent
2002^	M. Vedivel	All India Anna Dravida Munnetra Kazhagam
2006	H. Abdul Basith	Dravida Munnetra Kazhagam
2011	Govi. Sampath Kumar	All India Anna Dravida Munnetra Kazhagam
2016	Nilofer Kafeel	All India Anna Dravida Munnetra Kazhagam
2021	G. Sendhil Kumar	All India Anna Dravida Munnetra Kazhagam
2026	Syed Farooq Basha	Indian Union Muslim League

== Election results ==
Vote share of winning candidates
2026	34.43%
2021	46.69%
2016	40.31%
2011	54.65%
2006	53.16%
2001	48.26%
1996	67.36%
1991	54.98%
1989	41.20%
1984	45.36%
1980	52.54%
1977	42.86%
1971	56.13%
1967	50.77%
1962	54.86%
1957	51.85%
1952	34.28%

=== 2026 ===
2026 Tamil Nadu Legislative Assembly election: Vaniyambadi
Party	Candidate	Votes	%	±%
IUML	Syed Farooq Basha SSB	73,181	34.43	▼9.66
TVK	Syed Bhurhanudeen	70,199	33.03	New
AIADMK	Sendhil Kumar. G	61,055	28.73	▼17.96
NTK	Murugesan. G	4,849	2.28	▼3.68
NOTA	NOTA	624	0.29	▼0.50
BSP	Subramani. P	609	0.29	New
Makkal Arasial Katchi	Sundarammal	544	0.26	New
Aanaithinthiya Jananayaka Pathukappu Kazhagam	Anbarasu. P	231	0.11	New
Independent	Rajesh. T	213	0.10	New
TVK	Devendran. J	195	0.09	New
Independent	Manoj. S	166	0.08	New
Independent	Naveen. R	159	0.07	New
Independent	Srinivasan. A	158	0.07	New
Independent	Manjunath. K	140	0.07	New
Independent	Abdul Wahid. A	109	0.05	New
Independent	Selvaraj. M	102	0.05	New
Margin of victory		2,982	1.40	▼1.20
Turnout		2,12,534	87.35	▲11.75
Registered electors		2,43,320		▼6,037
IUML gain from AIADMK		Swing	New	

=== 2021 ===
2021 Tamil Nadu Legislative Assembly election: Vaniyambadi
Party	Candidate	Votes	%	±%
AIADMK	G. Sendhil Kumar	88,018	46.69	+6.38
IUML	N. Mohammed Nayeem	83,114	44.09	+12.2
NTK	A. J. Devendhiran	11,226	5.96	New
AIMIM	T. S. Vakeel Ahmed	1,897	1.01	New
MNM	M. Gnana Doss	1,868	0.99	New
NOTA	NOTA	1,492	0.79	−0.24
Margin of victory		4,904	2.60	−5.81
Turnout		188,505	75.60	−1.66
Rejected ballots		405	0.21	
Registered electors		249,357		
AIADMK hold		Swing	6.38	

=== 2016 ===
2016 Tamil Nadu Legislative Assembly election: Vaniyambadi
Party	Candidate	Votes	%	±%
AIADMK	Nelofer	69,588	40.31	−14.35
IUML	Syed Farooq Basha SSB	55,062	31.89	New
TMC(M)	C. Gnanasekaran	21,090	12.22	New
AIMIM	T. S. Vakeel Ahmed	10,117	5.86	New
PMK	Pattasu Velu	9,283	5.38	New
BJP	G. Venkatesan	1,935	1.12	New
NOTA	NOTA	1,774	1.03	New
WPOI	Mohammed Ismail	1,104	0.64	New
Margin of victory		14,526	8.41	−3.95
Turnout		172,638	77.26	−1.55
Registered electors		223,458		
AIADMK hold		Swing	-14.35	

=== 2011 ===
2011 Tamil Nadu Legislative Assembly election: Vaniyambadi
Party	Candidate	Votes	%	±%
AIADMK	Govi. Sampath Kumar	80,563	54.65	+19.9
DMK	H. Abdul Basith	62,338	42.29	−10.87
Independent	Mohammed Iliyas	2,548	1.73	New
BSP	J. Vazeer Ahmed	1,149	0.78	New
Independent	P. Abdul Wagith	807	0.55	New
Margin of victory		18,225	12.36	−6.05
Turnout		147,405	78.80	9.60
Registered electors		187,055		
AIADMK gain from DMK		Swing	1.49	

=== 2006 ===
2006 Tamil Nadu Legislative Assembly election: Vaniyambadi
Party	Candidate	Votes	%	±%
DMK	H. Abdul Basith	69,837	53.16	+15.53
AIADMK	K. Mohamed Ali	45,653	34.75	New
DMDK	K. Anwar-Ul-Haquy	9,937	7.56	New
Independent	N. Radha Krishanan	2,218	1.69	New
BJP	K. Anandan	1,821	1.39	New
ABHM	G. S. Jaisankar	770	0.59	New
Margin of victory		24,184	18.41	7.78
Turnout		131,360	69.21	11.53
Registered electors		189,807		
DMK gain from Independent		Swing	4.90	

=== 2002 Bypoll ===
Source: The Hindu

2002–03 Tamil Nadu Legislative Assembly by-elections: Vaniyambadi
Party	Candidate	Votes	%	±%
AIADMK	R. Vadivelu	63,599	49.2%	
DMK	E.M. Anifa	43,878	34.0%	
INL	Nawaz	11,324	8.8%	
MDMK	R. Lakshmi Kanthan	3,191	2.5%	
PNK	S. Shakila	1,135	0.9%	
LJSP	Abdullah Basha	1,045	0.8%	
Majority		19,721		
Turnout		129,217	63.7%	
AIADMK gain from INL		Swing		

- Indian National League is not a recognized party by ECI, so Nawaz was listed as an independent, rather than under the INL banner in the election ballots.

=== 2001 ===
2001 Tamil Nadu Legislative Assembly election: Vaniyambadi
Party	Candidate	Votes	%	±%
Independent	M. Abdul Lathief	54,218	48.26	New
DMK	J. M. Aaroon Rashid	42,280	37.63	−29.73
MDMK	R. Lakshmi Kanthan	7,724	6.88	New
Independent	Kaleel Nisar Ahmed	3,095	2.75	New
Independent	M. P. Natarajan	2,268	2.02	New
Independent	Sengam Jaffar	1,093	0.97	New
LJP	J. Parthiban	859	0.76	New
Margin of victory		11,938	10.63	−32.26
Turnout		112,346	57.68	−5.17
Registered electors		194,773		
Independent gain from DMK		Swing	-19.10	

=== 1996 ===
1996 Tamil Nadu Legislative Assembly election: Vaniyambadi
Party	Candidate	Votes	%	±%
DMK	M. Abdul Lathief	74,223	67.36	+32.82
INC	K. Kuppusamy	26,970	24.48	−30.5
BJP	M. Deenadayalan	4,883	4.43	+0.92
JD	K. Jayapal	2,253	2.04	New
Margin of victory		47,253	42.88	22.45
Turnout		110,189	62.85	5.16
Registered electors		180,164		
DMK gain from INC		Swing	12.38	

=== 1991 ===
1991 Tamil Nadu Legislative Assembly election: Vaniyambadi
Party	Candidate	Votes	%	±%
INC	E. Sampath	53,354	54.98	New
DMK	A. Abdul Hameed	33,523	34.54	−6.65
IMUL	A. P. A. Majid	4,973	5.12	New
BJP	G. S. Jaisankar	3,407	3.51	+2.39
Margin of victory		19,831	20.43	2.69
Turnout		97,046	57.69	−9.31
Registered electors		172,507		
INC gain from DMK		Swing	13.78	

=== 1989 ===
1989 Tamil Nadu Legislative Assembly election: Vaniyambadi
Party	Candidate	Votes	%	±%
DMK	P. Abdul Samad	39,723	41.20	−2.68
AIADMK	N. Kulasekara Pandiyan	22,614	23.45	New
IUML	A. K. Abdul Samad	21,599	22.40	New
Independent	N. Solaippan	6,657	6.90	New
Independent	A. Venkatesan	1,633	1.69	New
BJP	G. K. Velayudam	1,084	1.12	New
Independent	S. Karunanithi	912	0.95	New
Margin of victory		17,109	17.74	16.25
Turnout		96,421	67.00	−5.49
Registered electors		146,684		
DMK gain from INC		Swing	-4.17	

=== 1984 ===
1984 Tamil Nadu Legislative Assembly election: Vaniyambadi
Party	Candidate	Votes	%	±%
INC	H. Abdul Majeed	39,141	45.36	New
DMK	A. P. Abdul Majid	37,856	43.87	New
Independent	K. Kandasami	5,447	6.31	New
Independent	A. G. Pannerselvam	2,060	2.39	New
Independent	G. Selvam	718	0.83	New
Independent	T. Thangaraj	597	0.69	New
Margin of victory		1,285	1.49	−3.58
Turnout		86,283	72.48	8.57
Registered electors		123,922		
INC gain from AIADMK		Swing	-7.17	

=== 1980 ===
1980 Tamil Nadu Legislative Assembly election: Vaniyambadi
Party	Candidate	Votes	%	±%
AIADMK	N. Kulasekara Pandiyan	38,049	52.54	New
Independent	M. Abdul Latheef	34,375	47.46	New
Margin of victory		3,674	5.07	−8.99
Turnout		72,424	63.91	6.42
Registered electors		115,231		
AIADMK gain from Independent		Swing	9.68	

=== 1977 ===
1977 Tamil Nadu Legislative Assembly election: Vaniyambadi
Party	Candidate	Votes	%	±%
Independent	M. Abdul Lathief	26,620	42.86	New
DMK	R. Sampanghi	17,886	28.80	New
JP	Abdul Wahid	10,323	16.62	New
INC	A. Venkatesan	5,698	9.17	−29.22
Independent	N. K. Arumugam	1,136	1.83	New
Independent	P. Sayeed Ahmed	357	0.57	New
Margin of victory		8,734	14.06	−3.68
Turnout		62,108	57.50	−10.92
Registered electors		109,540		
Independent hold		Swing	-13.27	

=== 1971 ===
1971 Tamil Nadu Legislative Assembly election: Vaniyambadi
Party	Candidate	Votes	%	±%
Independent	M. Abdul Lathief	27,899	56.13	New
INC	R. C. Samanna Gounder	19,082	38.39	−12.38
Independent	B. A. Raju	2,407	4.84	New
Independent	V. N. Vadivelu	314	0.63	New
Margin of victory		8,817	17.74	14.65
Turnout		49,702	68.41	−7.29
Registered electors		80,631		
Independent gain from INC		Swing	5.36	

=== 1967 ===
1967 Madras Legislative Assembly election: Vaniyambadi
Party	Candidate	Votes	%	±%
INC	Rajamannar	26,946	50.77	+10.41
DMK	Vadivel	25,308	47.69	−7.18
Independent	M. Gounder	819	1.54	New
Margin of victory		1,638	3.09	−11.41
Turnout		53,073	75.70	6.29
Registered electors		72,746		
INC gain from DMK		Swing	-4.09	

=== 1962 ===
1962 Madras Legislative Assembly election: Vaniyambadi
Party	Candidate	Votes	%	±%
DMK	M. P. Vadival	27,275	54.86	New
INC	T. Karia Goundar	20,068	40.37	−11.49
We Tamils	N. Thathappan	2,372	4.77	New
Margin of victory		7,207	14.50	1.55
Turnout		49,715	69.41	24.97
Registered electors		74,567		
DMK gain from INC		Swing	3.01	

=== 1957 ===
1957 Madras Legislative Assembly election: Vaniyambadi
Party	Candidate	Votes	%	±%
INC	A. A. Rasheed	18,565	51.85	+24.24
Independent	M. P. Vadivelu Counder	13,930	38.91	New
Independent	G. E. Radhakrishnan	2,289	6.39	New
Independent	C. Govindarajan	1,019	2.85	New
Margin of victory		4,635	12.95	6.63
Turnout		35,803	44.44	−13.65
Registered electors		80,556		
INC gain from Independent		Swing	17.57	

=== 1952 ===
1952 Madras Legislative Assembly election: Vaniyambadi
Party	Candidate	Votes	%	±%
Independent	A. K. Hanumantharaya Gounder	15,529	34.28	New
Commonweal Party	M. Erusan	12,667	27.96	New
INC	Karia Gounder	12,511	27.62	New
RPI	C. Appadurai	3,182	7.02	New
Socialist Party (India)	M. K. Narayanaswami Gounder	1,412	3.12	New
Margin of victory		2,862	6.32	
Turnout		45,301	58.10	
Registered electors		77,971		
Independent win (new seat)				
