= The Goat, the Sofa, and Mr. Swami =

Book by R. Chandrasekar

The Goat, The Sofa And Mr. Swami
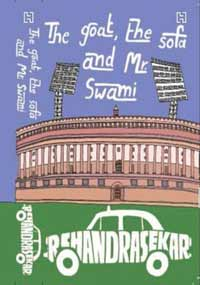
- Author: R. Chandrasekar
- Language: English
- Genre: Fiction, Humor
- Publisher: Hachette Book Group
- Publication date: 2010
- Publication place: India
- Pages: 306
- ISBN: 978-93-5009-061-9

The Goat, The Sofa And Mr. Swami is a book written by R. Chandrasekar about a Pakistani Prime Minister visiting India for a Test Cricket match and the ensuing diplomatic drama and chaos.

== The plot ==
The Pakistani Prime Minister's unexpected decision to invite himself to a cricket series scheduled to take place in India throws New Delhi into a state of uncertainty and confusion, triggering panic and bureaucratic manoeuvring. India's elderly Prime Minister, who is more interested in films, Scotch whisky and late mornings, seems largely unconcerned with the situation, but his unpredictable remarks and occasional outbursts only add to the confusion. His chief aide, a bureaucrat named Swami, takes advantage of the situation to further his career and settle old scores.

As the date of the Pakistani leader's visit approaches, longstanding rivalries between the Foreign Service and domestic bureaucrats come to the surface. Progress is repeatedly delayed as competing departments use obscure regulations to avoid taking responsibility. Aware of the historical significance of the visit and the consequences of a diplomatic failure, the Prime Minister begins staging protests of his own. Swami must then navigate the difficult relationships between his political and bureaucratic superiors.

A political satire rooted in the absurdities of modern India, the novel humorously examines the pretensions and rivalries of those in positions of power.

== About the author ==
R. Chandrasekar was born in Madras and studied at Mayo College, Vivekananda College Madras, the Delhi School of Economics and the University of Chicago. He has researched and priced commodities and derivatives, traded bonds, managed portfolios, taught, and run a financial research centre. Chandrasekar lives with his family in the city formerly known as Madras. This is his first novel.

== Other books by R. Chandrasekar ==
1. The School of Core Incompetence (Hachette India, 2012)
