= N. Chandramohan =

Indian politician (born 1962)

Member of the Tamil Nadu Legislative Assembly
- In office 2001–2006
- Preceded by: M. Panneerselvam
- Succeeded by: M. Panneerselvam
- Constituency: Sirkazhi

Personal details
- Born: 21 April 1962 Nandhiyanallur
- Party: All India Anna Dravida Munnetra Kazhagam
- Profession: Lawyer

N. Chandramohan is an Indian politician and a former Member of the Legislative Assembly (MLA) of Tamil Nadu. He hails from the village of Nandhiyanallur in the Mayiladuthurai district. Having completed his master's degree (M.A.) and Bachelor of Laws (B.L.), Chandramohan is a member of the All India Anna Dravida Munnetra Kazhagam (AIADMK) party. He was elected to the Tamil Nadu Legislative Assembly in the 2001 elections from the Sirkazhi Assembly constituency.

== Electoral Performance ==
=== 2001 ===
2001 Tamil Nadu Legislative Assembly election: Sirkazhi
Party	Candidate	Votes	%	±%
AIADMK	N. Chandramohan	52,759	49.31%	+17.56
DMK	J. Irai Ezhil	48,329	45.17%	−14.08
MDMK	R. Senthilselvan	3,220	3.01%	−0.19
CPI(ML)L	N. Gunasekaran	2,680	2.50%	+1.92
Margin of victory		4,430	4.14%	−23.36%
Turnout		106,988	64.76%	−7.20%
Registered electors		165,329		
AIADMK gain from DMK		Swing	-9.94%	
