= Syed Farooq Basha =

Indian politician (born 1962)

Member of the Tamil Nadu Legislative Assembly
- Incumbent
- Assumed office 11 May 2026
- Preceded by: G. Sendhil Kumar
- Constituency: Vaniyambadi

Personal details
- Party: Indian Union Muslim League

SSB Syed Farooq Basha (born 1962) is an Indian politician from Tamil Nadu. He is a member of the Tamil Nadu Legislative Assembly from the Vaniyambadi seat in Tirupathur district representing the Indian Union Muslim League which contested the 2026 election in alliance with Dravida Munnetra Kazhagam (DMK) and other parties as Secular Progressive Alliance.

== Early life and education ==
Basha is from Vaniyambadi, in the erstwhile Vellore district, presently trifurcated into Tirupathur district, Tamil Nadu. He is the son of Syed Razaq. He studied at Alangayam Government Primary School and passed Class 5 in April 1974. Later, he discontinued his studies. He runs his own business. He declared assets worth Rs.3 crore in his affidavit to the Election Commission of India.

== Career ==
Basha won the 2026 Tamil Nadu Legislative Assembly election from the Vaniyambadi Assembly constituency representing the Indian Union Muslim League. He polled 73,181 votes and defeated his nearest rival, S. Syed Bhurhanudeen of the Tamilaga Vettri Kazhagam, by a margin of 2.982 votes.
