= M. Abdul Lathief =

Indian politician

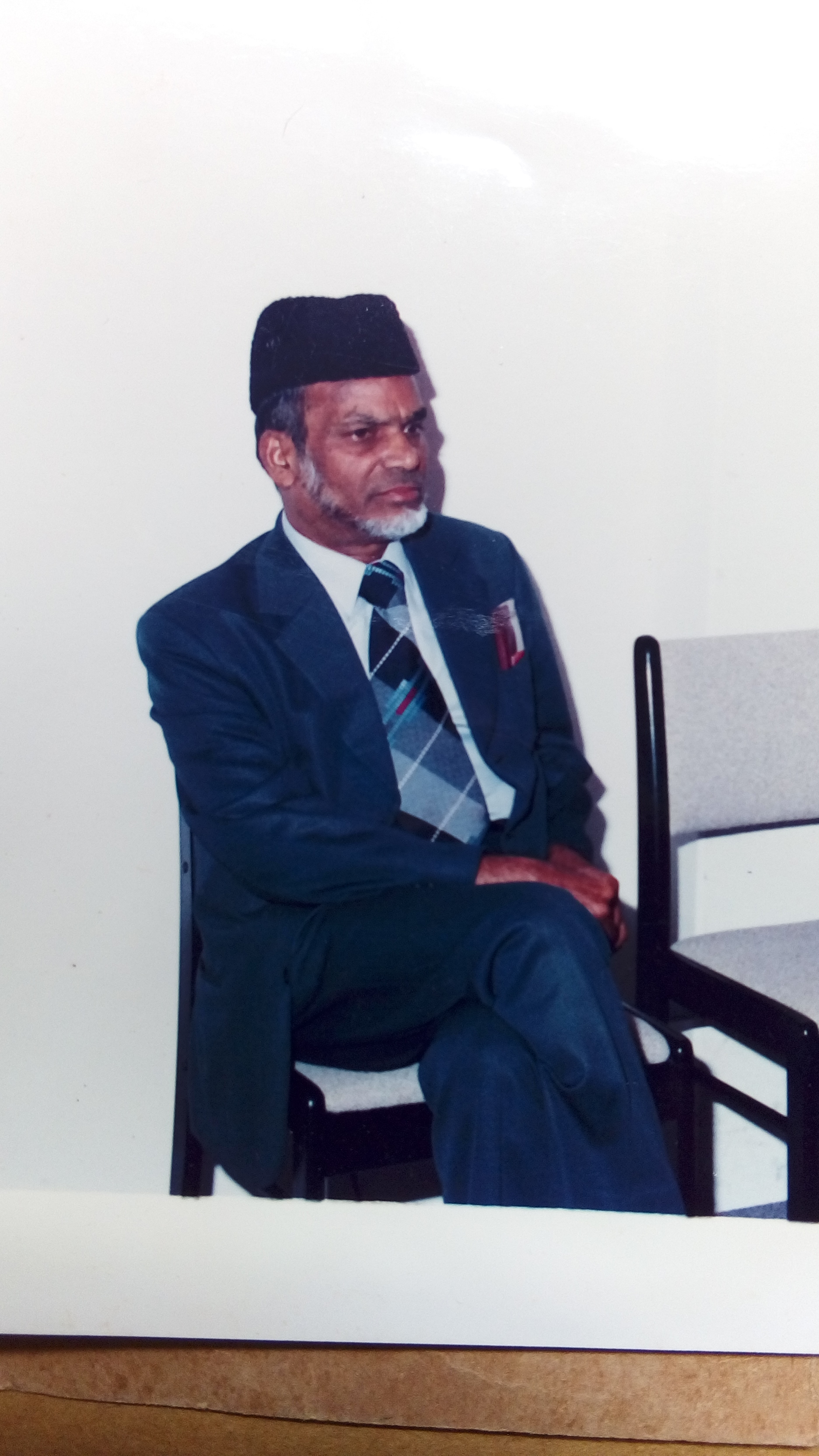
M. Abdul Lathief

M. Abdul Lathief, (birth1.7.1936 died 17 December 2001) was an Indian who had been chairman of Tamil Nadu Wakf Board and a Member of the Legislative Assembly (MLA) of Tamil Nadu.He was a former leader of Indian union Muslim league and later he resigned from it.

Lathief was elected to the Tamil Nadu legislative assembly from Vaniyambadi constituency as an independent candidate in 1971 and 1977. Again standing as an independent in Vaniyambadi, he was runner-up to the Anna Dravida Munnetra Kazhagam (ADMK) candidate in the 1980 election.

Lathief won the Chepauk constituency as a Dravida Munnetra Kazhagam (DMK) candidate in 1989. For the 1991 elections, Lathief stood in Ranipet constituency for the DMK and finished runner-up to the ADMK.

In the 1996 assembly elections, Lathief won the Vaniyambadi seat again. On this occasion he was listed as a candidate of the DMK. He then won it as an independent in the 2001 elections, after which he was pro tem Speaker. He was also at that time the general secretary of the Indian National League.

Lathief was chairman of the Tamil Nadu Wakf Board on two occasions, between May 1989-March 1992 and from June 1997 to July 1999.

Lathief died of a heart attack in hospital at Chennai on 17 December 2001, aged 65. Announcing his death, The Hindu described him as "A law graduate, an irrepressible orator and a polyglot". He also served as Acting Speaker of the Tamil Nadu Legislative Assembly in 2001.

== Electoral performance ==
Election	Constituency	Political party	Result	Vote %	Opposition			Ref
Election	Constituency	Political party	Result	Vote %	Candidate	Political party	Vote %	Ref
1971	Vaniyambadi	Independent	Won	56.13%	R. C. Samanna Gounder	INC	38.39%	
1977	Vaniyambadi	Independent	Won	42.86%	R. C. Samanna Gounder	DMK	28.80%	
1980	Vaniyambadi	Independent	Lost	47.46%	N. Kulasekara Pandiyan	AIADMK	52.54%	
1989	Chepauk	DMK	Won	50.21%	S. M. Hidayathulla	INC	22.38%	
1996	Vaniyambadi	DMK	Won	67.36%	K. Kuppusamy	INC	24.48%	
2001	Vaniyambadi	Independent	Won	48.26%	J. M. Aaroon Rashid	DMK	37.63%	
