= Thirukkavalampadi =

Perumal temple in Mayiladuthurai district, Tamil Nadu, India

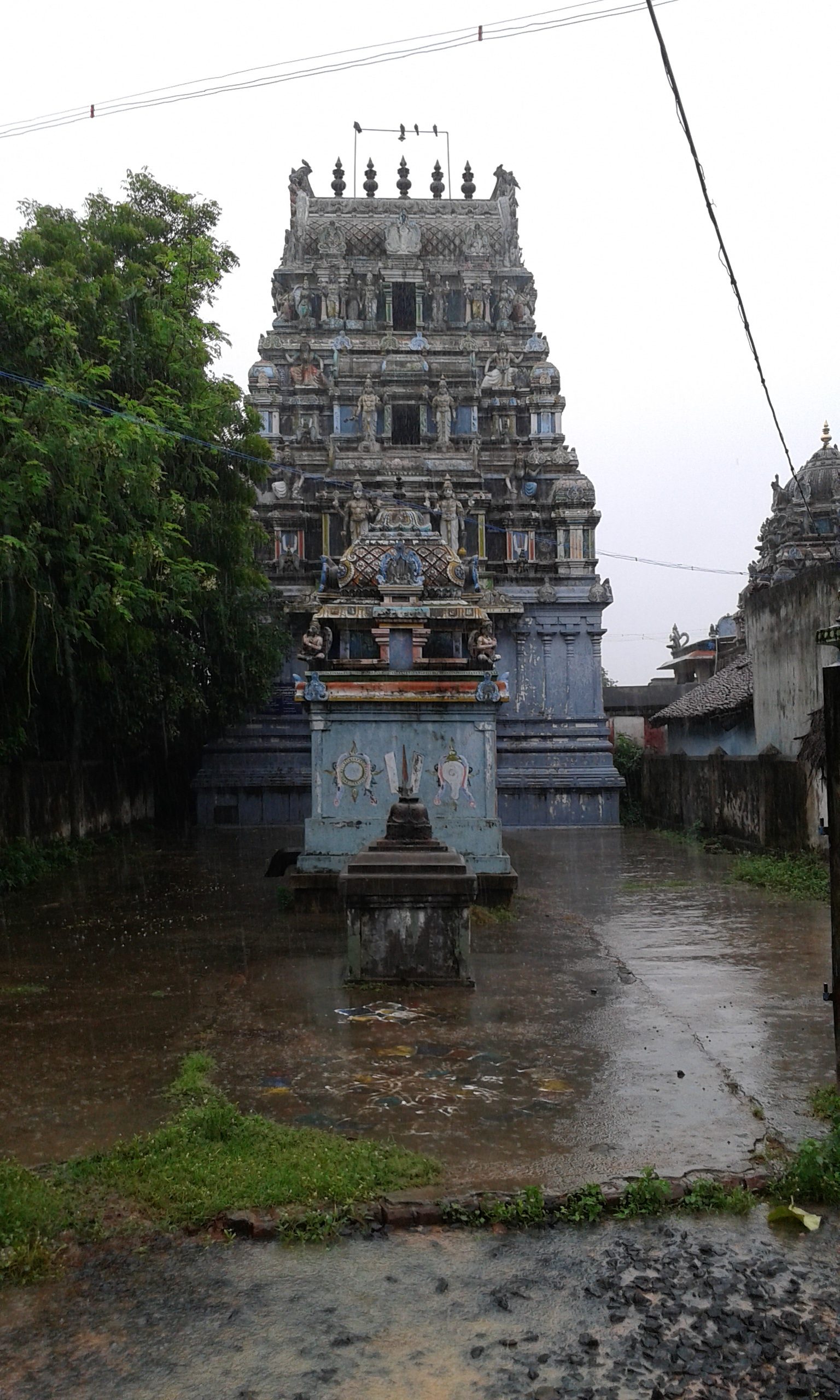

- Location in Tamil Nadu

Religion
- Affiliation: Hinduism
- District: Mayiladuthurai
- Deity: Gopalakrishna Perumal (Vishnu) Rukmini, Satyabhama (Lakshmi)

Location
- Location: Thirunangur
- State: Tamil Nadu
- Country: India

Architecture
- Type: Dravidian architecture

Thirukkavalampadi also known as the Gopalakrishna Perumal Temple is a hindu temple located in Thirunangur in Sirkali taluk of Mayiladuthurai district, in the South Indian state of Tamil Nadu. It is dedicated to the Hindu god Vishnu. Constructed in the Dravidian style of architecture, the temple is glorified in the Nalayira Divya Prabandham, the early medieval Tamil canon of the Alvar saints from the 6th–9th centuries CE. It is one of the 108 Divya Desams dedicated to Vishnu, who is worshipped as Gopalakrishnan and his consort Lakshmi in two forms as Rukmini and Satyabhama.

It is one among the eleven Divya Desams of Thirunangur Tirupathis and is closely associated with Thirumangai Alvar. The temple is open from 8 a.m. to 10 a.m. and 5 p.m. to 7 p.m and has four daily rituals at various times of the day. The Thirumangai Alvar Mangalasasana Utsavam celebrated annually during the Tamil month of Thai is the major festival of the temple during which the festival images of the eleven Thirunangur Tirupathis are brought on mount designed like Garuda, called Garuda Vahana, to Thirunangur.

== Legend ==
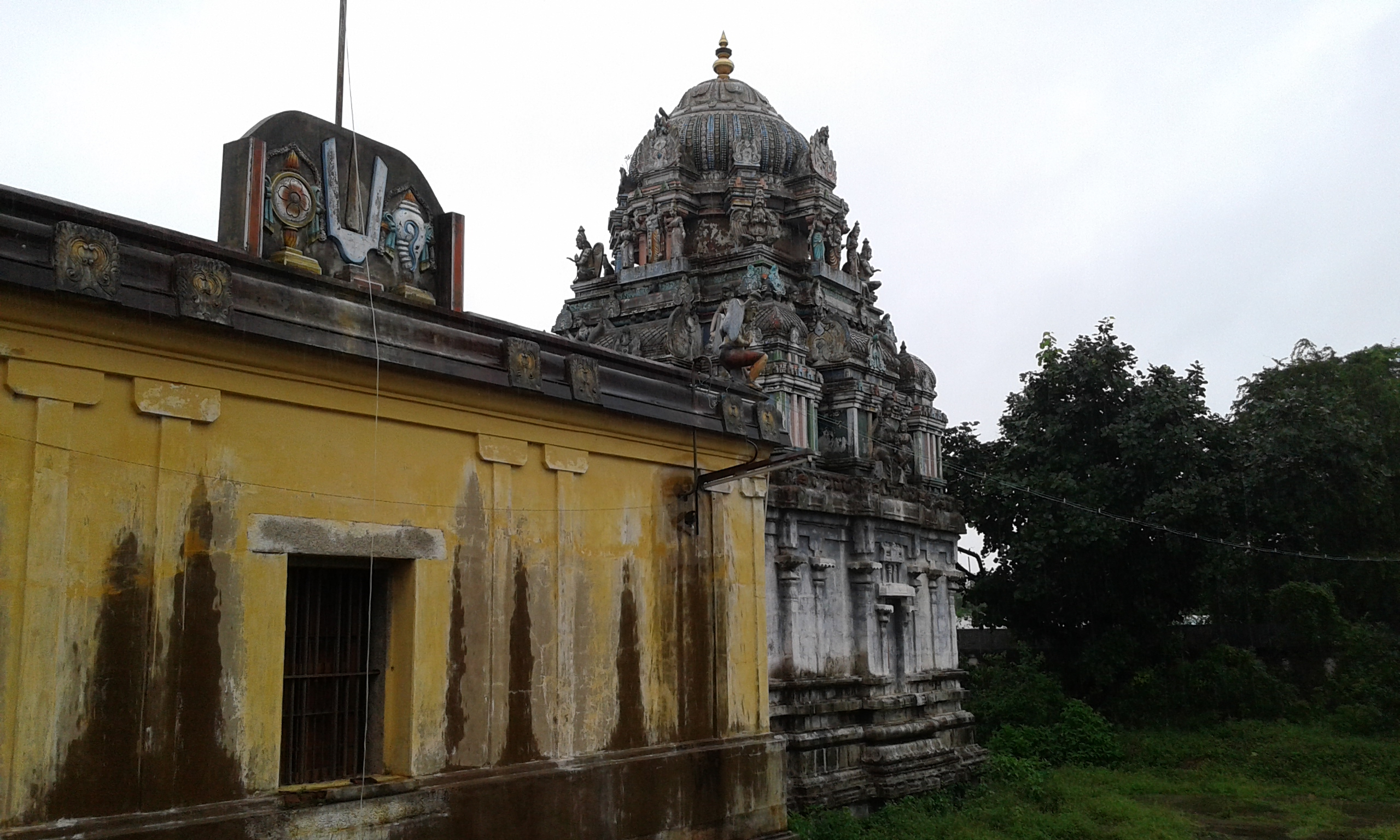
Image of the sanctum and the vimana

The legend of all the eleven temples of Thirunangur are closely associated with each other. As per legend, the Hindu god Shiva started dancing in fury at this place after the death of his consort Uma due to the yagna (sacrifice) of Daksha. Each time his lock of hair touched the ground, there were eleven other forms of Shiva who appeared. The celestial deities were worried that if the dance continues, it would result in decimation of entire creations. They prayed to Vishnu for help, who appeared at this place. On seeing Vishnu, Shiva's anger was reduced and he requested Vishnu to appear in eleven forms like he did. On his request, Vishnu appeared in eleven different forms at Tirunangur. The eleven places where Vishnu appeared are believed to be where the eleven temples in Tirunangur are located. As per another variant, Shiva requested Vishnu to appear in eleven different forms like him to control the eleven Shiva forms he created. The eleven Rudras, called Ekadas Rudras and king of devas, Indra, are believed to have worshiped Vishnu at this temple.

As per another legend, Krishna, the eighth incarnation of Vishnu and his consort Satyabhama chose this location for their garden as it was looking like the one in the palace of the king of celestial deities, Indra. Kavalam indicates elephant and padi indicates place - it is believed that Krishna saved an elephant at this place leading to the name of the temple. The event is described in the verses of Tirumangai Alvar in Nalayira Divya Prabandham.

== Architecture ==
Gopalakrishna temple is located in Thirunangur, a small village, 10 km away from Sirkali, on the way to Thiruvenkadu. The temple has a small shrine with Vimanam. The shrine houses the granite image of Gopalakrishna and his consorts Rukmini and Sathya Bhama on either sides. Gopalakrishna is sported in standing posture with his consorts Rukmini and Sathyabama. The name of the consort in a separate shrine is Madavaragal Mangai and Sengamala Nachiar. The temple has a three-tiered Gopuram and the shrine of Garuda is located outside the gopuram, axial to the central shrine. There are only two major shrines, one that of Gopalkrishna and one for his consorts.

== Worship practices and festivals ==
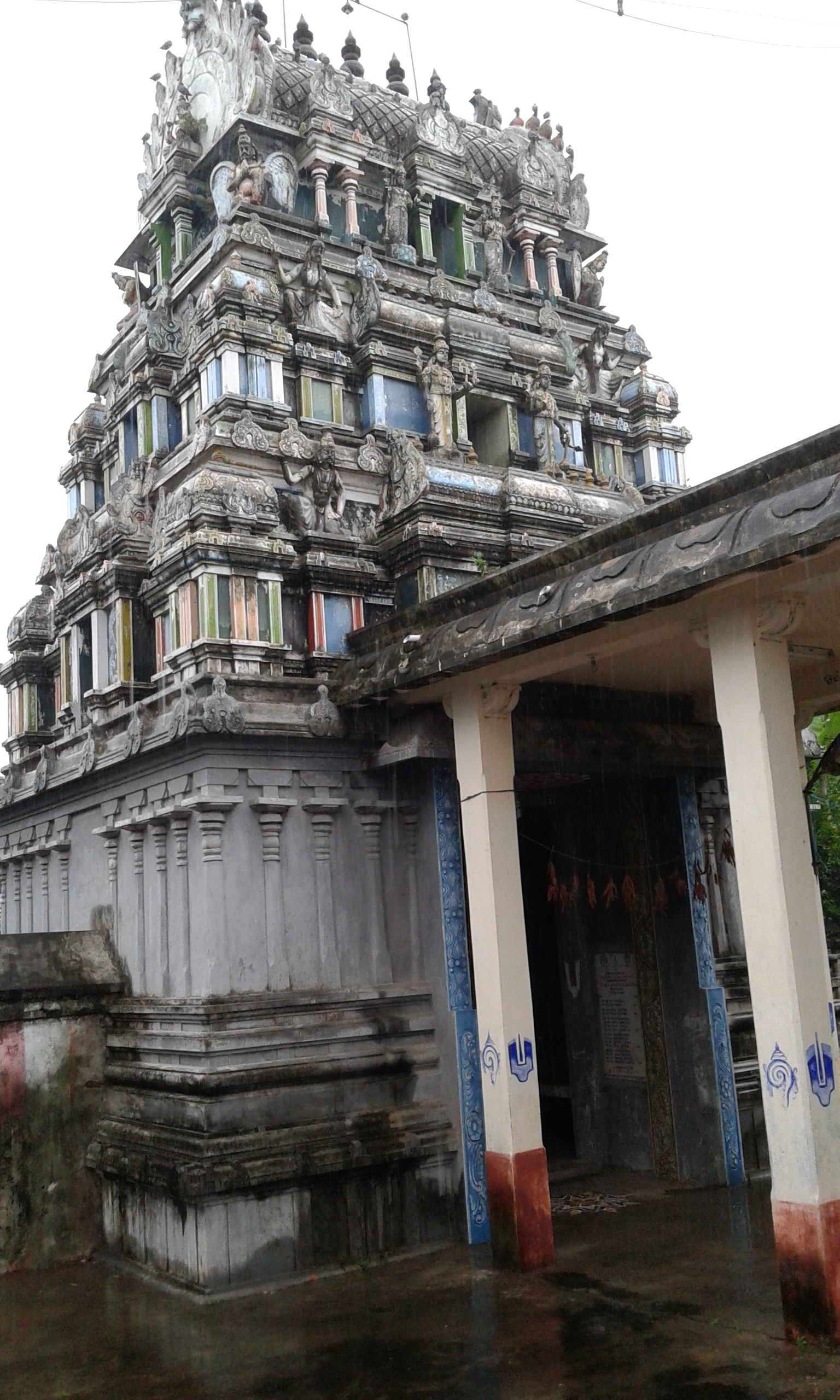
View of the temple tower

The temple is open from 8 a.m. to 10 a.m. and 5 p.m. to 7 p.m. The temple priests perform the pooja (rituals) during festivals and on a daily basis. The temple belongs to Tenkalai sect of Vaishnavism. As at other Vishnu temples of Tamil Nadu, the priests belong to the Vaishnavaite community, from the Brahmin varna. The temple rituals are performed four times a day: Ushathkalam at 8 a.m., Kalasanthi at 10:00 a.m., Sayarakshai at 5:00 p.m. and Ardha Jamam at 7:00 p.m. Each ritual has three steps: alangaram (decoration), neivethanam (food offering) and deepa aradanai (waving of lamps) for both Gopalakrishna, Rukmini and Sathyabama. During the worship, religious instructions in the Vedas (sacred text) are recited by priests, and worshippers prostrate themselves in front of the temple mast. There are weekly, monthly and fortnightly rituals performed in the temple.

During the new moon day of the Tamil month Thai, the festival deity of Thirumangai Alvar is brought to the temple from Thiruvali-Thirunagari. The Thirumangai Alvar Mangalasasana Utsavam is celebrated in the Tamil month of Thai (January–February). The highlight of the festival is Garudasevai, an event in which the festival images of the eleven Thirunangur Tirupathis are brought on mount designed like Garuda, called Garuda Vahana, to Thirunangur. The festive image of Thirumangai Alvar is also brought on a Hamsa Vahanam (palanquin) and his pasurams (verses) dedicated to each of these eleven temples are recited during the occasion. The festival images of Thirumangai Alvar and his consort Kumudavalli Naachiyar are taken in a palanquin to each of the eleven temples. The verses dedicated to each of the eleven temples are chanted in the respective shrines. This is one of the most important festivals in the region which draws thousands of visitors.

== Religious significance ==
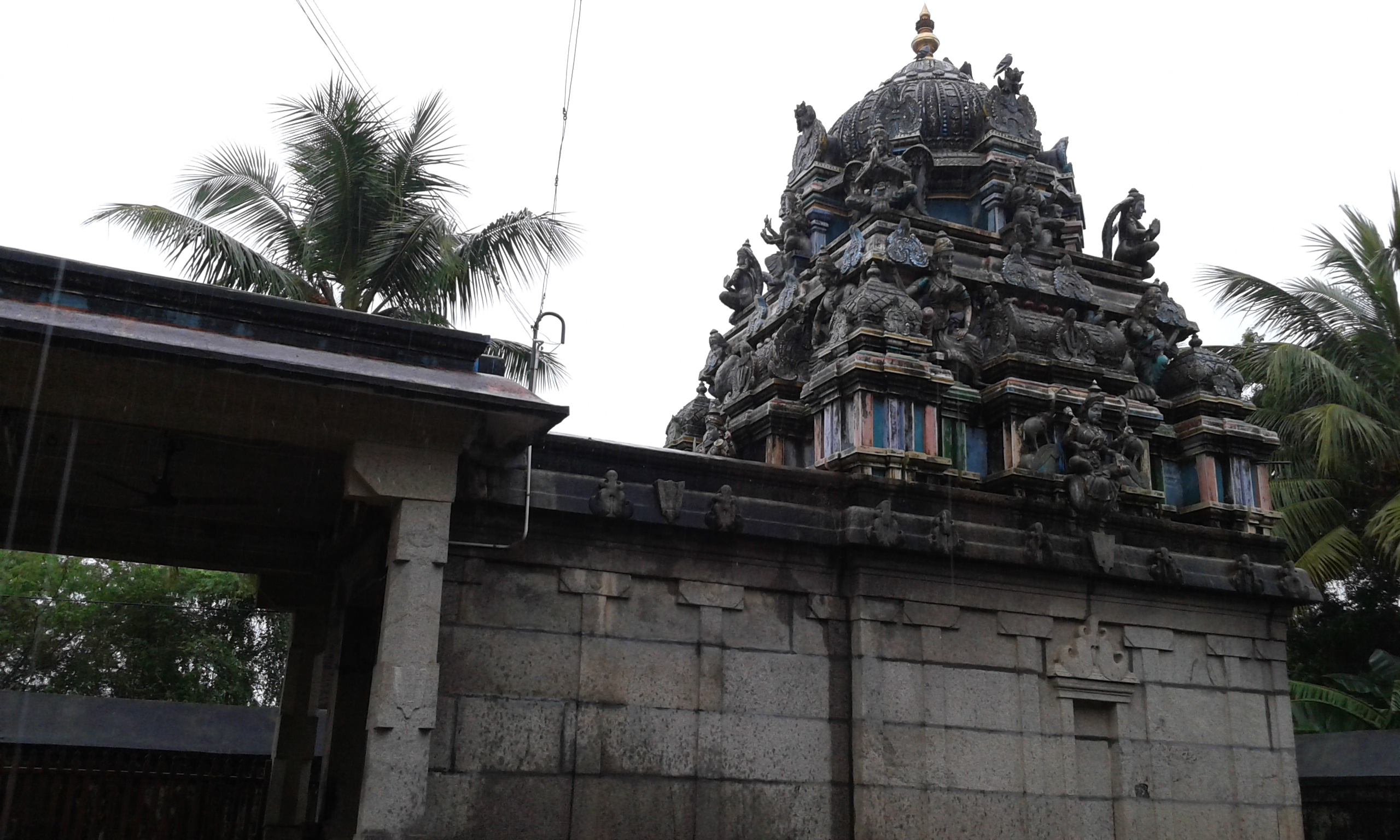
Image of the shrine of Thayar

The temple is revered in Nalayira Divya Prabhandam, the 7th–9th century Vaishnava canon, by Periyalvar, Thirumalisai Alvar and Thirumangai Alvar. The temple is classified as a Divya Desam, one of the 108 Vishnu temples that are mentioned in the book. During the 18th and 19th centuries, the temple finds mention in several works like 108 Tirupathi Anthathi by Divya Kavi Pillai Perumal Aiyangar. It is believed that saint Thirumanagai Alvar visits the place every year to the festival to consecrate the eleven deities. As per local belief, the fresh winds which swirl the paddy fields before the day of the festival indicates a good harvest for the season. As per another legend, the sages Madangar, Domyar, Vyaghrapada and Udangar set up their hermitages in this place. During the period of Mahabharatha, Takshaka, the mighty snake king who killed king Parikshit, ruled the place called Nagapuri, which eventually became Nangur.
