= Sirkazhi Assembly constituency =

One of the 234 State Legislative Assembly Constituencies in Tamil Nadu, in India

Coordinates: 11.24°N 79.73°E

Sirkazhi
- Constituency No. 160 for the Tamil Nadu Legislative Assembly

Constituency details
- Country: India
- Region: South India
- State: Tamil Nadu
- District: Mayiladuthurai
- Lok Sabha constituency: Mayiladuthurai
- Established: 1951
- Total electors: 241,432
- Reservation: SC

Member of Legislative Assembly
- 17th Tamil Nadu Legislative Assembly
- Incumbent R. Senthilselvan
- Party: DMK
- Elected year: 2026

Sirkazhi is a state assembly constituency in Tamil Nadu. The constituency is reserved for candidates from the Scheduled Caste (SC) community in Mayiladuthurai district. It is one of the 234 State Legislative Assembly Constituencies in Tamil Nadu, in India.

The assembly seat has been won by Dravida Munnetra Kazhagam (DMK) in the 1977, 1989, 1996 and 2006 elections and Anna Dravida Munnetra Kazhagam (ADMK) in 1980, 1984, 1991, 2001 and 2011. As of 2026, the MLA of the constituency is R. Senthilselvan from the DMK.

== Members of Legislative Assembly ==
Year	Winner	Party
Madras State
1952	C. Muthiah Pillai	Indian National Congress
1957	C. Muthiah Pillai	Indian National Congress
1957	K. B. S. Mani	Indian National Congress
1962	R. Thangavelu	Indian National Congress
1967	K. B. S. Mani	Independent
Tamil Nadu
1971	S. Vadivel	Communist Party of India
1977	K. Subravelu	Dravida Munnetra Kazhagam
1980	K. Balasubramanian	All India Anna Dravida Munnetra Kazhagam
1984	K. Balasubramanian	All India Anna Dravida Munnetra Kazhagam
1989	M. Panneerselvam	Dravida Munnetra Kazhagam
1991	T. Moorthy	All India Anna Dravida Munnetra Kazhagam
1996	M. Panneerselvam	Dravida Munnetra Kazhagam
2001	N. Chandramohan	All India Anna Dravida Munnetra Kazhagam
2006	M. Panneerselvam	Dravida Munnetra Kazhagam
2011	M. Sakthi	All India Anna Dravida Munnetra Kazhagam
2016	P. V. Bharathi	All India Anna Dravida Munnetra Kazhagam
2021	M. Panneerselvam	Dravida Munnetra Kazhagam
2026	R. Senthilselvan	Dravida Munnetra Kazhagam

== Election results ==
Vote share of winning candidates
2026	35.64%
2021	49.41%
2016	43.05%
2011	54.62%
2006	47.34%
2001	49.31%
1996	59.25%
1991	61.29%
1989	40.78%
1984	55.65%
1980	57.78%
1977	43.38%
1971	53.25%
1967	58.23%
1962	35.80%
1957	29.25%
1952	36.75%

=== 2026 ===
2026 Tamil Nadu Legislative Assembly election: Sirkazhi
Party	Candidate	Votes	%	±%
DMK	R. Senthilselvan	71,449	35.64	▼13.77
AIADMK	M. Sakthi	60,032	29.95	▼13.08
TVK	S. Gopinath	59,149	29.51	New
NTK	R. Subash	7,397	3.69	▼2.10
NOTA	NOTA	555	0.28	▼0.23
Margin of victory		11,417	5.69	▼0.69
Turnout		2,00,448	83.02	▲7.64
Registered electors		2,41,432		▼11,078

=== 2021 ===
2021 Tamil Nadu Legislative Assembly election: Sirkazhi
Party	Candidate	Votes	%	±%
DMK	M. Panneerselvam	94,057	49.41%	+11.43
AIADMK	P. V. Bharathi	81,909	43.03%	−0.02
NTK	A. Kavitha	11,013	5.79%	+4.98
AMMK	Pon. Balu	1,308	0.69%	New
MNM	R. Prabu	1,000	0.53%	New
NOTA	NOTA	977	0.51%	−0.25
Margin of victory		12,148	6.38%	1.32%
Turnout		190,348	75.38%	−1.31%
Rejected ballots		91	0.05%	
Registered electors		252,510		
DMK gain from AIADMK		Swing	6.37%	

=== 2016 ===
2016 Tamil Nadu Legislative Assembly election: Sirkazhi
Party	Candidate	Votes	%	±%
AIADMK	P. V. Bharathi	76,487	43.05%	−11.58
DMK	S. Killai Ravindran	67,484	37.98%	New
PMK	N. Muthukumar	14,890	8.38%	New
DMDK	R. Umanath	12,060	6.79%	New
NTK	B. Jothi	1,430	0.80%	New
NOTA	NOTA	1,360	0.77%	New
BJP	M. R. S. Elavalagan	1,187	0.67%	New
Margin of victory		9,003	5.07%	−12.76%
Turnout		177,685	76.70%	−2.12%
Registered electors		231,675		
AIADMK hold		Swing	-11.58%	

=== 2011 ===
2011 Tamil Nadu Legislative Assembly election: Sirkazhi
Party	Candidate	Votes	%	±%
AIADMK	Dr. M. Sakthi	83,881	54.62%	New
VCK	P. Durairajan	56,502	36.79%	New
Independent	P. Kalaivani	4,018	2.62%	New
Independent	M. Kanivannan	3,779	2.46%	New
Independent	S. Kumararaja	1,721	1.12%	New
BSP	M. Krishnaraj	1,331	0.87%	New
Independent	A. Mayavan	1,030	0.67%	New
Margin of victory		27,379	17.83%	14.77%
Turnout		153,561	78.82%	7.02%
Registered electors		194,824		
AIADMK gain from DMK		Swing	7.29%	

=== 2006 ===
2006 Tamil Nadu Legislative Assembly election: Sirkazhi
Party	Candidate	Votes	%	±%
DMK	M. Panneerselvam	58,609	47.34%	+2.16
VCK	P. Durairajan	54,818	44.27%	New
DMDK	Pon. Balakrishnan	5,143	4.15%	New
CPI(ML)L	N. Gunasekaran	1,497	1.21%	−1.3
Independent	M. Muthu Balakrishnan	1,260	1.02%	New
BJP	S. Elavazhagan	1,115	0.90%	New
SP	K. Tamilmaran	996	0.80%	New
Margin of victory		3,791	3.06%	−1.08%
Turnout		123,817	71.80%	7.04%
Registered electors		172,456		
DMK gain from AIADMK		Swing	-1.98%	

=== 2001 ===
2001 Tamil Nadu Legislative Assembly election: Sirkazhi
Party	Candidate	Votes	%	±%
AIADMK	N. Chandramohan	52,759	49.31%	+17.56
DMK	J. Irai Ezhil	48,329	45.17%	−14.08
MDMK	R. Senthilselvan	3,220	3.01%	−0.19
CPI(ML)L	N. Gunasekaran	2,680	2.50%	+1.92
Margin of victory		4,430	4.14%	−23.36%
Turnout		106,988	64.76%	−7.20%
Registered electors		165,329		
AIADMK gain from DMK		Swing	-9.94%	

=== 1996 ===
1996 Tamil Nadu Legislative Assembly election: Sirkazhi
Party	Candidate	Votes	%	±%
DMK	M. Panneerselvam	63,975	59.25%	+31.38
AIADMK	V. Bharathi	34,281	31.75%	−29.54
PMK	P. Muthusamy	5,461	5.06%	New
MDMK	R. Senthilselvan	3,452	3.20%	New
CPI(ML)L	N. Gunasekaran	630	0.58%	New
Margin of victory		29,694	27.50%	−5.92%
Turnout		107,973	71.96%	1.54%
Registered electors		157,467		
DMK gain from AIADMK		Swing	-2.03%	

=== 1991 ===
1991 Tamil Nadu Legislative Assembly election: Sirkazhi
Party	Candidate	Votes	%	±%
AIADMK	T. Moorthy	62,321	61.29%	+46.12
DMK	M. Panneerselvam	28,337	27.87%	−12.91
PMK	A. Samivelu	10,931	10.75%	New
Margin of victory		33,984	33.42%	7.98%
Turnout		101,690	70.42%	2.53%
Registered electors		150,643		
AIADMK gain from DMK		Swing	20.51%	

=== 1989 ===
1989 Tamil Nadu Legislative Assembly election: Sirkazhi
Party	Candidate	Votes	%	±%
DMK	M. Panneerselvam	36,512	40.78%	−2.67
INC	Ramasamy N	13,737	15.34%	New
AIADMK	K. Balasubramanian	13,577	15.16%	−40.49
AIADMK	Moorthy T	12,576	14.04%	−41.61
Independent	K. B. S. Mani	12,385	13.83%	New
Independent	P. Natesan	628	0.70%	New
Margin of victory		22,775	25.43%	13.22%
Turnout		89,543	67.90%	−12.28%
Registered electors		134,525		
DMK gain from AIADMK		Swing	-14.88%	

=== 1984 ===
1984 Tamil Nadu Legislative Assembly election: Sirkazhi
Party	Candidate	Votes	%	±%
AIADMK	K. Balasubramanian	51,438	55.65%	−2.12
DMK	M. Panneerselvam	40,152	43.44%	+1.22
Margin of victory		11,286	12.21%	−3.34%
Turnout		92,423	80.17%	5.70%
Registered electors		120,444		
AIADMK hold		Swing	-2.12%	

=== 1980 ===
1980 Tamil Nadu Legislative Assembly election: Sirkazhi
Party	Candidate	Votes	%	±%
AIADMK	K. Balasubramanian	49,334	57.78%	+20.57
DMK	K. Subravelu	36,054	42.22%	−1.15
Margin of victory		13,280	15.55%	9.38%
Turnout		85,388	74.47%	4.37%
Registered electors		116,654		
AIADMK gain from DMK		Swing	14.40%	

=== 1977 ===
1977 Tamil Nadu Legislative Assembly election: Sirkazhi
Party	Candidate	Votes	%	±%
DMK	K. Subravelu	34,281	43.38%	New
AIADMK	K. Balasubramanian	29,405	37.21%	New
INC	K. Vaithilingam	8,503	10.76%	−31.98
JP	D. Kailasam	6,405	8.10%	New
Independent	M. Gurusamy	440	0.56%	New
Margin of victory		4,876	6.17%	−4.34%
Turnout		79,034	70.10%	−6.19%
Registered electors		114,299		
DMK gain from CPI		Swing	-9.87%	

=== 1971 ===
1971 Tamil Nadu Legislative Assembly election: Sirkazhi
Party	Candidate	Votes	%	±%
CPI	S. Vadivel	31,977	53.25%	New
INC	K. B. S. Mani	25,667	42.74%	+6.26
Independent	N. S. Muruges	2,409	4.01%	New
Margin of victory		6,310	10.51%	−11.24%
Turnout		60,053	76.28%	−3.80%
Registered electors		84,532		
CPI gain from Independent		Swing	-4.98%	

=== 1967 ===
1967 Madras Legislative Assembly election: Sirkazhi
Party	Candidate	Votes	%	±%
Independent	K. B. S. Mani	34,316	58.23%	New
INC	R. Thangavelu	21,502	36.48%	+0.68
Independent	P. Munian	3,116	5.29%	New
Margin of victory		12,814	21.74%	11.30%
Turnout		58,934	80.08%	3.81%
Registered electors		78,901		
Independent gain from INC		Swing	22.42%	

=== 1962 ===
1962 Madras Legislative Assembly election: Sirkazhi
Party	Candidate	Votes	%	±%
INC	R. Thangavelu	22,434	35.80%	+6.55
Independent	K. B. S. Mani	15,890	25.36%	New
DMK	P. Velayutham	12,626	20.15%	New
CPI	V. Velayutham	11,708	18.69%	+5.68
Margin of victory		6,544	10.44%	9.38%
Turnout		62,658	76.28%	−29.46%
Registered electors		86,331		
INC hold		Swing	6.55%	

=== 1957 ===
1957 Madras Legislative Assembly election: Sirkazhi
Party	Candidate	Votes	%	±%
INC	C. Muthiah Pillai	48,973	29.25%	−7.5
INC	K. B. S. Mani	47,194	28.19%	−8.56
CPI	K. Sami Durai Annangar	21,768	13.00%	−18.8
CPI	V. Velayutham (Sc)	14,496	8.66%	−23.14
Independent	P. Velayutham (Sc)	11,629	6.95%	New
Independent	C. Jambu	10,363	6.19%	New
Independent	N. Govindasami Naidu	9,710	5.80%	New
Independent	Krishnanyagi (Sc)	3,278	1.96%	New
Margin of victory		1,779	1.06%	−3.89%
Turnout		167,411	105.74%	40.23%
Registered electors		158,328		
INC hold		Swing	-7.50%	

=== 1952 ===
1952 Madras Legislative Assembly election: Sirkazhi
Party	Candidate	Votes	%	±%
INC	C. Muthiah Pillai	18,622	36.75%	New
CPI	K. Swamithurai Annagar	16,114	31.80%	New
Independent	C. Ramanatha Mudaliar	6,643	13.11%	New
Independent	S. T. S. V. Murugavel Padayachi	5,942	11.73%	New
Independent	S. Pakkiriswami Pillai	1,835	3.62%	New
Socialist Party (India)	N. Somasundaram Pillai	1,512	2.98%	New
Margin of victory		2,508	4.95%	
Turnout		50,668	65.51%	
Registered electors		77,345		
INC win (new seat)				
