= Govi. Sampath Kumar =

Indian politician

Govi. Sampath Kumar is an Indian politician and was a member of the 14th Tamil Nadu Legislative Assembly from the Vaniyambadi constituency. He represented the All India Anna Dravida Munnetra Kazhagam party.

The elections of 2016 resulted in his constituency being won by Nilofer Kafeel.
