= P. Abdul Samad =

Indian politician

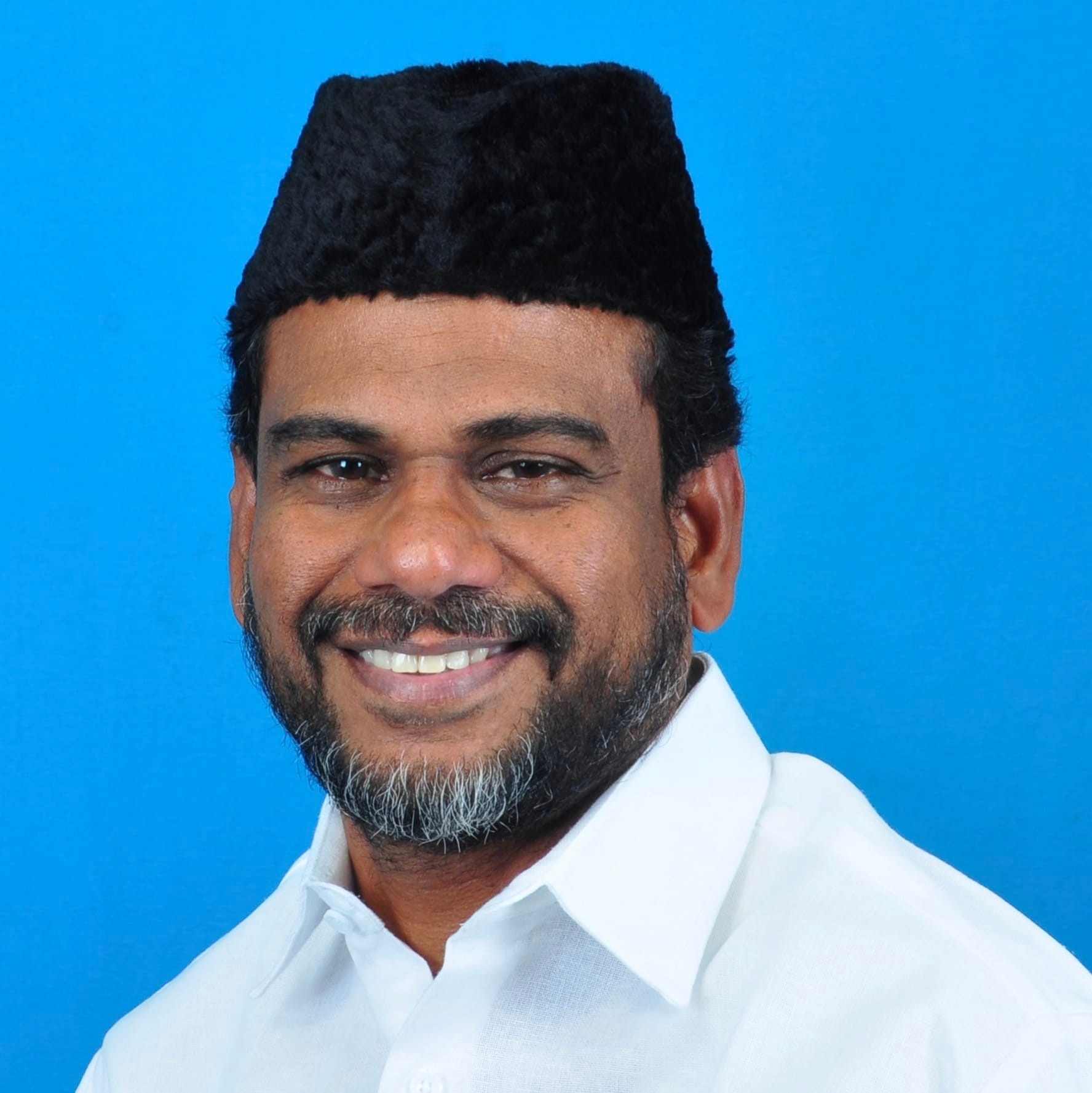

Member of the Tamil Nadu Legislative Assembly
- In office 12 May 2021 – 4 May 2026
- Preceded by: R. Chandrasekar
- Constituency: Manapaarai

Personal details
- Born: June 3, 1969 (age 57)
- Party: Manithaneya Makkal Katchi

P. Abdul Samad is an Indian politician who is a Member of Legislative Assembly of Tamil Nadu. He was elected from Manapparai as a Manithaneya Makkal Katchi candidate in 2021, but contested the seat on the DMK rising sun electoral symbol.

== Electoral performance ==
2021 Tamil Nadu Legislative Assembly election: Manapaarai
Party	Candidate	Votes	%	±%
MNMK	P. Abdul Samad	98,077	44.43%	New
AIADMK	R. Chandrasekar	85,834	38.88%	−5.49
NTK	P. Kanimozhi	19,450	8.81%	+7.91
DMDK	P. Krishnagopal	10,719	4.86%	−7.92
Independent	V. Chandrasekar	1,259	0.57%	New
NOTA	NOTA	1,009	0.46%	−1.18
Margin of victory		12,243	5.55%	−3.33%
Turnout		220,739	76.19%	−2.29%
Rejected ballots		330	0.15%	
Registered electors		289,713		
MNMK gain from AIADMK		Swing	0.05%	
