= R. Kathiravan =

Indian politician

Member of the Tamil Nadu Legislative Assembly
- Incumbent
- Assumed office 2026
- Preceded by: Abdul Samad P.
- Constituency: Manapparai

Personal details
- Born: 1993 (age 32–33)
- Party: Tamilaga Vettri Kazhagam
- Profession: Politician

Ramachandran Kathiravan is an Indian politician from Tamil Nadu. He is a member of the Tamil Nadu Legislative Assembly from Manapparai representing Tamilaga Vettri Kazhagam.

== Early life and education ==
Kathiravan is the son of M. Ramachandran. He is involved in social service and sales-related professional activities. He completed a Bachelor of Engineering degree in Mechanical Engineering from S.A. Engineering College, Chennai, in 2014.

== Political career ==
Kathiravan won the Manapparai seat in the 2026 Tamil Nadu Legislative Assembly election as a candidate of Tamilaga Vettri Kazhagam. He received 83,041 votes and defeated P. L. Vijayakumar of the All India Anna Dravida Munnetra Kazhagam by a margin of 1,426 votes.
