= M. Panneerselvam (Sirkazhi MLA) =

Indian politician

Member of the Tamil Nadu Legislative Assembly
- In office 2 May 2021 – 4 May 2026
- Preceded by: P. V. Bharathi
- Constituency: Sirkazhi

Personal details
- Party: Dravida Munnetra Kazhagam

M. Panneerselvam is an Indian politician and former Member of the Legislative Assembly of Tamil Nadu. He was elected to the Tamil Nadu legislative assembly from Sirkazhi constituency as a Dravida Munnetra Kazhagam (DMK) candidate in the 1989, 1996, and 2006 elections. He is the present MLA of Sirkazhi.He is an advocate.

== Elections contested ==
| Election | Constituency | Party | Result | Vote % | Runner-up | Runner-up Party | Runner-up vote % | Ref. |
|---|---|---|---|---|---|---|---|---|
| 2021 Tamil Nadu Legislative Assembly election | Sirkazhi | DMK | Won | 49.41% | P. V. Bharathi | AIADMK | 43.03% | |
| 2006 Tamil Nadu Legislative Assembly election | Sirkazhi | DMK | Won | 49.31% | P. Durairajan | VCK | 45.17% | |
| 1996 Tamil Nadu Legislative Assembly election | Sirkazhi | DMK | Won | 59.25% | V. Bharathi | AIADMK | 31.75% | |
| 1991 Tamil Nadu Legislative Assembly election | Sirkazhi | DMK | Lost | 27.87% | T. Moorthy | AIADMK | 61.29% | |
| 1989 Tamil Nadu Legislative Assembly election | Sirkazhi | DMK | Won | 40.78% | N. Ramasamy | INC | 15.34% | |
| 1984 Tamil Nadu Legislative Assembly election | Sirkazhi | DMK | Lost | 43.44% | K. Balasubramanian | AIADMK | 55.65% | |
