= G. Sendhil Kumar =

Indian politician

Member of the Tamil Nadu Legislative Assembly
- In office 12 May 2021 – 11 May 2026
- Preceded by: Nilofer Kafeel
- Succeeded by: Syed Farooq Basha
- Constituency: Vaniyambadi

Personal details
- Party: All India Anna Dravida Munnetra Kazhagam
- Occupation: Politician

G. Sendhil Kumar is an Indian politician. He is a member of the All India Anna Dravida Munnetra Kazhagam party. He was elected as a member of Tamil Nadu Legislative Assembly from Vaniyambadi constituency in May 2021.

== Electoral performance ==
2021 Tamil Nadu Legislative Assembly election: Vaniyambadi
Party	Candidate	Votes	%	±%
AIADMK	G. Sendhil Kumar	88,018	46.69	+6.38
IUML	N. Mohammed Nayeem	83,114	44.09	+12.2
NTK	A. J. Devendhiran	11,226	5.96	New
AIMIM	T. S. Vakeel Ahmed	1,897	1.01	New
MNM	M. Gnana Doss	1,868	0.99	New
NOTA	NOTA	1,492	0.79	−0.24
Margin of victory		4,904	2.60	−5.81
Turnout		188,505	75.60	−1.66
Rejected ballots		405	0.21	
Registered electors		249,357		
AIADMK hold		Swing	6.38	
