= S. R. Munusamy =

Indian politician

Member of the Madras State Legislative Assembly
- In office 1957–1962
- Constituency: Ambur

Personal details
- Party: Independent politician

S. R. Munusamy was an Indian politician and former Member of the Legislative Assembly of Tamil Nadu. He was elected to the Tamil Nadu legislative assembly as an Indian National Congress candidate from Ambur constituency in 1957 election. He was one of the two winners and the other being V. K. Krishnamurthy.

== Electoral performance ==
Election	Constituency	Political party	Result	Vote %	Opposition			Ref
Election	Constituency	Political party	Result	Vote %	Candidate	Political party	Vote %	Ref
1957	Ambur	Independent	Won	14.99%	Sampangi Naidu	Independent	22.07%	
1962	Ambur	RPI	Lost	33.66%	P. Rajagopal	INC	53.73%	
