= Kazheesirama Vinnagaram =

Perumal temple in Mayiladuthurai district, Tamil Nadu, India

- Thadalan Kovil
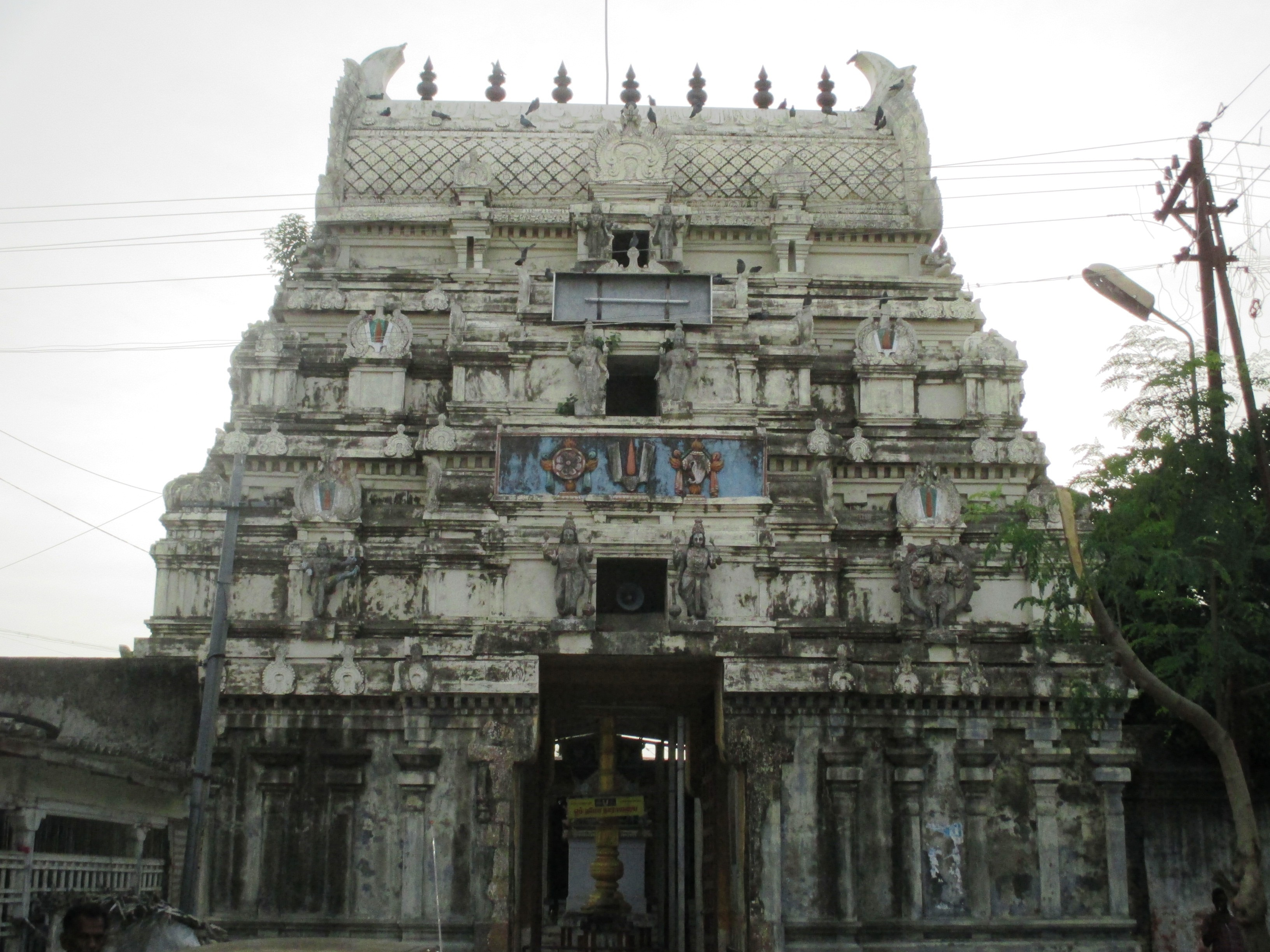
- Gopuram (entrance tower) of the temple

- Location in Tamil Nadu

Religion
- Affiliation: Hinduism
- District: Mayiladuthurai
- Deity: Tiruvikrama Narayana Perumal (Vishnu); Loka Nayaki Thayar (Lakshmi)
- Features: Tower: Pushkala Vartha; Temple tank: Shankha Pushkarani - Chakra Theertham

Location
- Location: Sirkazhi
- State: Tamil Nadu
- Country: India
- Coordinates: 11°14′26″N 79°43′53″E

Architecture
- Type: Dravidian architecture
- Creator: Chola Empire

Kazheesirama Vinnagaram or Thadalan Kovil or Trivikrama Perumal Temple is a Hindu temple dedicated to Vishnu located in Sirkazhi, of Mayiladuthurai district, Tamil Nadu, India. Constructed in the Dravidian style of architecture, the temple is glorified in the Nalayira Divya Prabandham, the early medieval Tamil canon of the Alvar saints from the 6th–9th centuries CE. It is one of the 108 Divya Desams dedicated to Vishnu, who is worshipped as Trivikrama and his consort Lakshmi as Loganayagi. The temple is believed to have been built by Cholas, with later contributions from Medieval Cholas, Vijayanagara kings, and Madurai Nayaks.

The temple is found in Sirkazhi, and situated in a location called Thadalan Kovil. The temple complex actually houses all the shrines within large concentric walls completed by a three-tiered Rajagopuram (entrance tower). There are three major shrines in the temple, with the one of Trivikrama-Vishnu in the main sanctum and two other shrines of Loganyagi-Lakshmi and Andal being the most prominent. The temple's water tank, Chakra Tirtham, is located behind the shrine.

The Brahmotsavam festival is celebrated during the Tamil month of Vaikasi (May–June). The temple is maintained and administered by the Hindu Religious and Endowment Board of the Government of Tamil Nadu. The temple follows the Vaishnava Tenkalai mode of worship.

== Legend ==
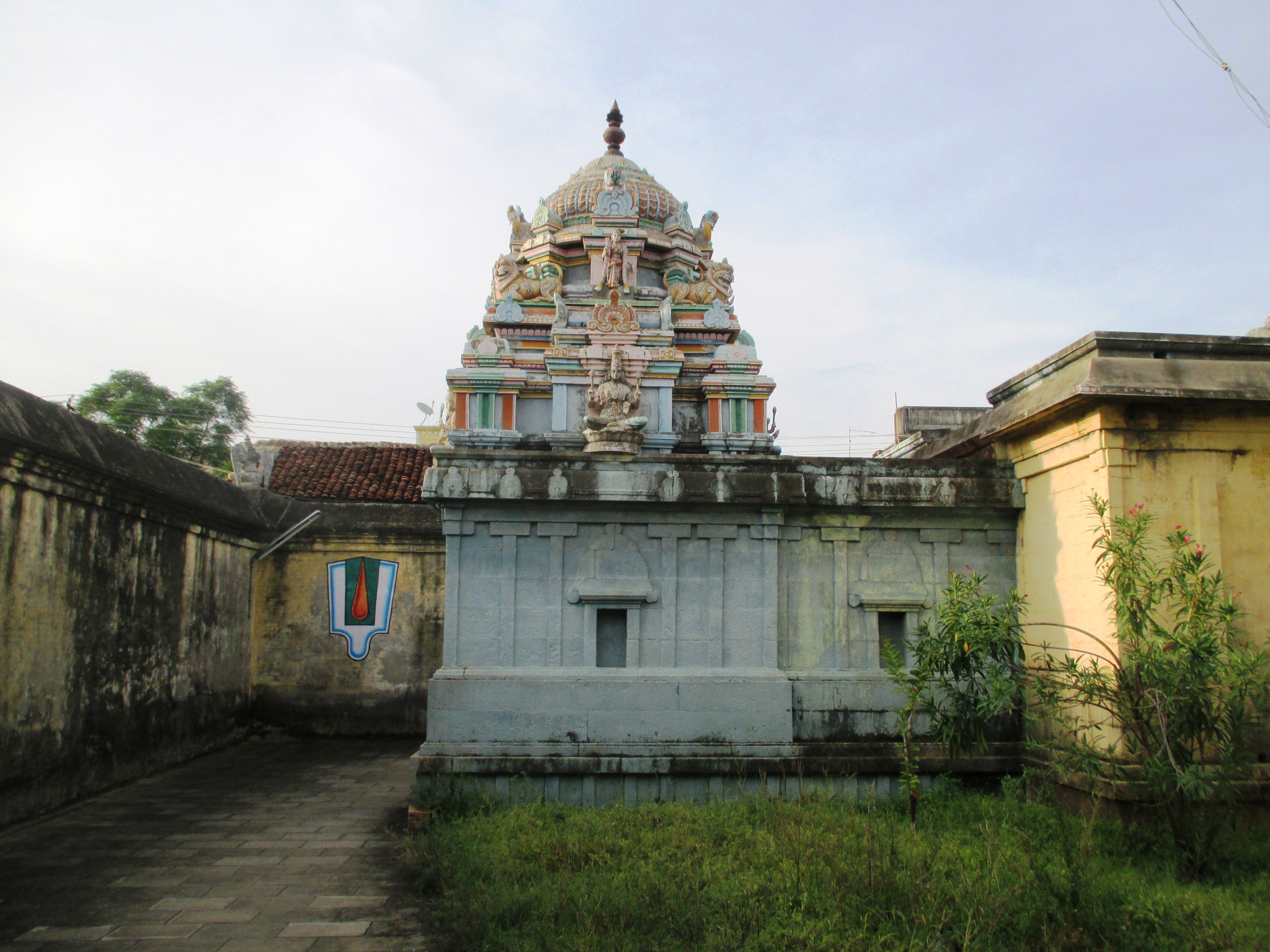
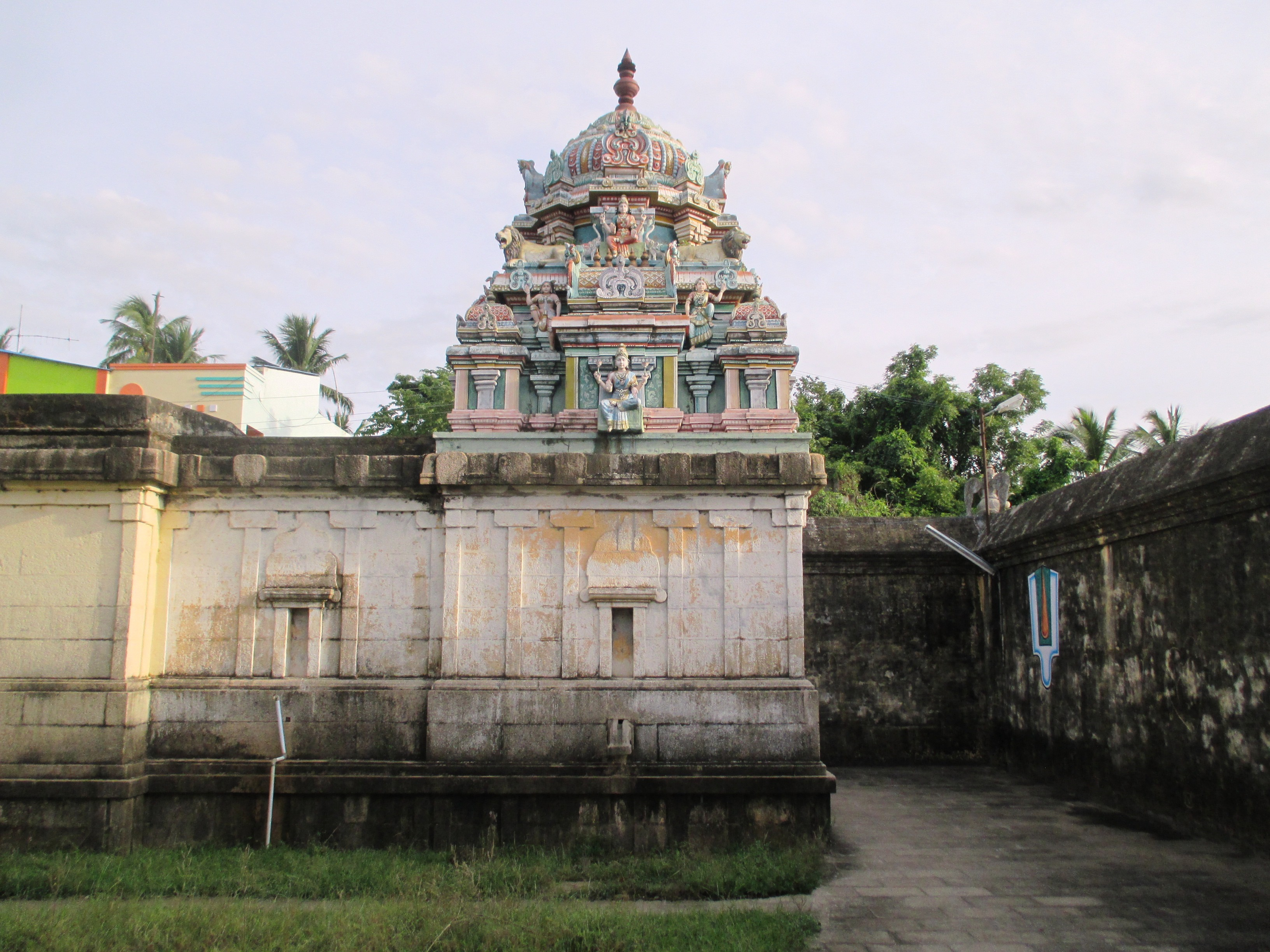
The shrines of Andal and Lakshmi-Loganayagi in the temple

The Bhagavata Purana describes that Vishnu descended as the Vamana avatar to restore the authority of Indra over the heavens, as it had been taken by Mahabali, a benevolent asura King. Bali was the grandson of Prahlada. King Mahabali was generous and engaged in severe austerities and penance and won the praise of the world. With the praise from his courtiers and others, he regarded himself as all-powerful in the world. To defeat Mahabali's false pride, Vishnu appeared as Vamana, a short Brahmin carrying a wooden umbrella, and went to the king to request three paces of land. Mahabali consented, against the warning of his guru, Shukracharya. Vamana then revealed his true identity and enlarged to gigantic proportions to stride over the three worlds. He lifted his leg till the heaven for the first step, then till the earth for the second step, but did not have anything to step on for the third step. King Mahabali, unable to fulfil his promise, offered his head for the third. Vamana then placed His Foot and gave the king immortality for his humility. In worshipping Mahabali and his grandfather Prahlada, he was given sovereignty of Pátála, the netherworld. Some texts also report that Vamana did not step into the netherworld, and instead gave its rule to Bali. In giant form, Vamana is known as Trivikrama. The legend is associated with Thrikkakara Temple in Kerala, but also with this temple, the Ulagalantha Perumal Temple, Tirukoyilur and the Ulagalantha Perumal Temple, Kanchipuram. That makes a total of four shrines dedicated to the Vamana form in South India.

== Architecture ==
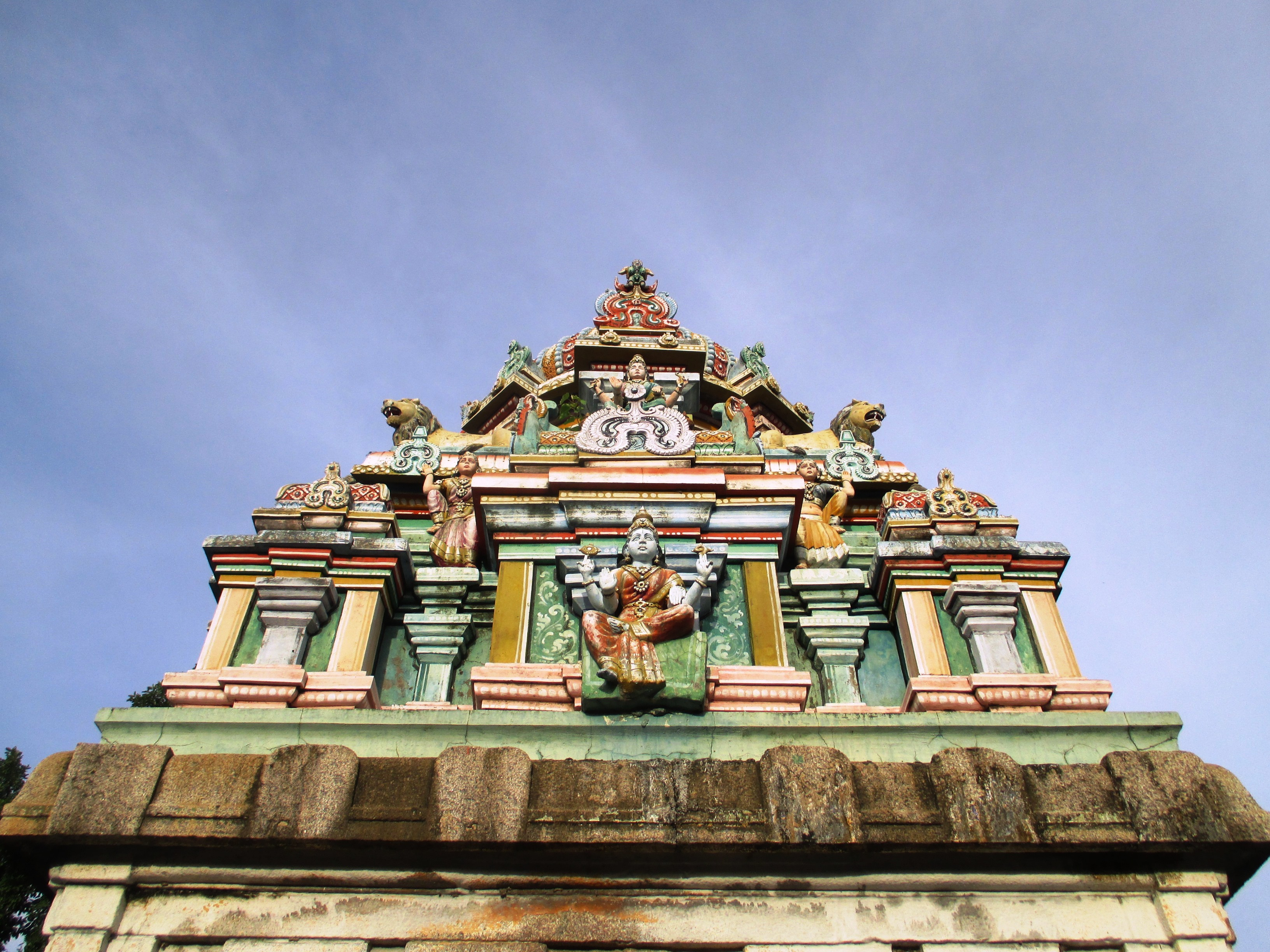
View of the vimana (sanctum tower)

The temple is located in the town of Sirkazhi in Mayiladuthurai district. The Vaishnavite poet-saint Thirumangai Alvar won an ideological debate challenge against the Shaivaite poet Sambandar by composing Pasurams (poems) in praise of Vishnu, who is nicknamed Mann alantha Tadalan meaning the one who measured the land. The name Tadalan is in honour of the Trivikrama (Vamana) form, and the mulavar (main idol) fixed in the central shrine is in this form. The main idol of Trivikrama is made of black stone and shows Vishnu as Vamana, having four hands which hold his symbols, the Sudarshana Chakra and the Panchajanya conch shell. He is balancing on one leg, lifting his left leg high. In front of the main idol are the utsavars (the metal processional idols) of Vishnu, Sridevi and Bhudevi. The presiding deity, Trivikrama, appeared for sage Ashtakoma.

The temple has a rectangular plan with the sides of the temple covered by tall brick walls. The temple tower, the rajagopuram has a three-tiered structure. The sanctum is approached from the gateway tower through a flagpost, altar, an elevated hall and two other halls, namely the Mahamandapa and the Ardhamandapa. The shrine of Vishnu's wife Lakshmi as Lokanayagi is located in a shrine around the first sanctum in the north-western corner beyond the sanctum, and the shrine of the Vaishnavite poet Andal is located on the other corner. The temple's water tank, Chakra Tirtham, is located behind the main shrine.

== Literary mention ==
The temple is mentioned in the Nalayira Divya Prabandham, the 7th–9th century Vaishnava canon, by Thirumangai Alvar in one hymn of Thirunedunthandagam. The temple is classified as a Divya Desam, one of the 108 Vishnu temples in the book.
