= Erukkur =

Coordinates: 11°17′N 79°43′E

Erukkur is a village located nearby Sirkazhi in Mayiladuthurai district, Tamil Nadu, India. It is located just 10 km from the Bay of Bengal; 5 km from Kollidam; 20 km from Chidambaram; 250 km from Chennai and 80 km from Pondicherry.

Agriculture and Fishing forms the backbone of the Erukkur economy. Tourism is another major institution.

A 365 years old Catholic church, dedicated to the Virgin Mary, known as the Our Lady of Chindhaaththirai Matha Shrine is located at Erukkur.
