= K. B. S. Mani =

Indian politician

Kadirvel Bala Subramani, popularly known as K.B.S. Mani, was a military man, social reformer, Indian politician and Member of the Legislative Assembly of Tamil Nadu. He was elected to the Tamil Nadu legislative assembly from the Sirkazhi constituency as an Indian National Congress candidate in the 1957 election, and as an independent in the 1967 election. Along with C. Muthiah Pillai from the Congress party, he was one of the two winners in 1957 election.

He also served as a Member of Parliament elected from Tamil Nadu. He was elected to the Lok Sabha from the Perambalur constituency as an Indian National Congress (I) candidate in the 1980 election.
