= C. Muthiah Pillai =

Indian politician

C. Muthiah Pillai was an Indian politician and former Member of the Legislative Assembly of Tamil Nadu. He was elected to the Tamil Nadu legislative assembly from Sirkazhi constituency as an Indian National Congress candidate in 1952, and 1957 elections. He was one of the two winners in 1957 election, the other being K. B. S. Mani from the same party.
