= A. Aslam Basha =

Indian politician

Member of Tamil Nadu Legislative Assembly from Ambur constituency
- In office 2011 – May 2016
- Succeeded by: R. Bala Subramani

Personal details
- Born: 1968
- Died: 21 July 2020 (aged 51–52)
- Party: Manithaneya Makkal Katchi
- Relations: T. S. Abdul Khayoom (father)
- Education: Islamiah College, Vaniyampadi

Abdul Khayoom Aslam Basha (1968 -2020) was an Indian politician and a member of the 14th Tamil Nadu Legislative Assembly from the Ambur constituency. He represented the Manithaneya Makkal Katchi party.

The elections of 2016 resulted in his constituency being won by R. Bala Subramani.

He died in July 2020 aged 52.

== Electoral performance ==
Election	Constituency	Political party	Result	Vote %	Opposition			Ref
Election	Constituency	Political party	Result	Vote %	Candidate	Political party	Vote %	Ref
2011	Ambur	MNMK	Won	44.01%	J. Vijay Elanchezian	INC	40.30%	
