= A. C. Vilwanathan =

Indian politician

Member of the Tamil Nadu Legislative Assembly
- Incumbent
- Assumed office 23 May 2019
- Constituency: Ambur

Personal details
- Party: Dravida Munnetra Kazhagam

A. C. Vilwanathan is an Indian politician and is Member of the Legislative Assembly of Tamil Nadu. He was elected to the Tamil Nadu legislative assembly as a Dravida Munnetra Kazhagam candidate from Ambur constituency in the by-election in 2019 and 2021.

== Electoral performance ==
Election	Constituency	Political party	Result	Vote %	Opposition			Ref
Election	Constituency	Political party	Result	Vote %	Candidate	Political party	Vote %	Ref
2019 by-election	Ambur	DMK	Won	56.79%	J. Jothi Ramalinga Raja	AIADMK	34.55%	
2021	Ambur	DMK	Won	51.27%	K. Nazar Mohamed	AIADMK	39.81%	-
2026	Ambur	DMK	Won	37.89%	Imthiyaz Pandarattudu Abdu	TVK	34.24%	-
