= Ambur Assembly constituency =

State Legislative Assembly Constituency in Tamil Nadu

Coordinates: 12.78°N 78.7°E

Ambur
- Constituency No. 48 for the Tamil Nadu Legislative Assembly

Constituency details
- Country: India
- Region: South India
- State: Tamil Nadu
- District: Tirupathur
- Lok Sabha constituency: Vellore
- Established: 1957
- Total electors: 2,14,898
- Reservation: None

Member of Legislative Assembly
- 17th Tamil Nadu Legislative Assembly
- Incumbent Vilwanathan. A.C
- Party: DMK
- Elected year: 2026

Ambur is a state assembly constituency in Tirupattur district in Tamil Nadu, India. Its State Assembly Constituency number is 48. It comprises portions of Vellore and Vaniyambadi taluks and is a part of Vellore Lok Sabha constituency for national elections to the Parliament of India. It was in existence from the 1957 to 1971 state elections of Madras State, following which it became a constituency of Tamil Nadu. It is one of the 234 State Legislative Assembly constituencies in Tamil Nadu.

== Members of the Legislative Assembly ==
Election	Member	Party
1957	V. K. Krishnamurthy	Indian National Congress
1957	S. R. Munusami	Independent politician
1962	P. Rajagopal	Indian National Congress
1967	M. Panneerselvam	Dravida Munnetra Kazhagam
1971	M. Panneerselvam	Dravida Munnetra Kazhagam
2011	A. Aslam Basha	Manithaneya Makkal Katchi
2016	R. Balasubramani	All India Anna Dravida Munnetra Kazhagam
2019 by-election	A. C. Vilwanathan	Dravida Munnetra Kazhagam
2021	A. C. Vilwanathan	Dravida Munnetra Kazhagam
2026	A. C. Vilwanathan	Dravida Munnetra Kazhagam

Madras State

== Election results ==
=== Assembly election 2026 ===
2026 Tamil Nadu Legislative Assembly election : Ambur
Party	Candidate	Votes	%	±%
DMK	A. C. Vilwanathan	74,102	37.89	▼13.38
TVK	Imthiyaz Pandarattudu Abdu	66,971	34.24	New
AIADMK	Venkatesan. R	47,100	24.08	New
NTK	Afshia Nasrin. S	4,185	2.14	▼3.61
NOTA	None of the above	468	0.24	▼0.56
Margin of victory		7,131	3.65	▼7.82
Turnout		195,785	91.11	▲16.39
Total valid votes		195,584		
Registered electors		214,898		▼9.89
DMK hold		Swing		

=== Assembly election 2021 ===
2021 Tamil Nadu Legislative Assembly election : Ambur
Party	Candidate	Votes	%	±%
DMK	A. C. Vilwanathan	90,476	51.27	▼5.52
AIADMK	K. Nazar Mohamed	70,244	39.81	▲5.26
NTK	Maharunnisha	10,150	5.75	▲3.91
SDPI	A. S. A. Umar Farook	1,793	1.02	New
MNM	S. Raja	1,638	0.93	▼0.16
NOTA	None of the above	1,417	0.80	▼0.29
Margin of victory		20,232	11.47	▼10.76
Turnout		178,192	74.72	▼1.80
Total valid votes		176,461		
Rejected ballots		314	0.18	▲0.18
Registered electors		238,473		▲6.27
DMK hold		Swing		

=== Assembly by-election 2019 ===
2019 Tamil Nadu Legislative Assembly by-election : Ambur
Party	Candidate	Votes	%	±%
DMK	A. C. Vilwanathan	96,455	56.79	New
AIADMK	J. Jothi Ramalinga Raja	58,688	34.55	▼14.61
Independent	R. Balasubramani	8,856	5.21	
NTK	N. Selvamani	3,127	1.84	▲1.48
MNM	A. Kareem Basha	1,853	1.09	New
NOTA	None of the above	1,847	1.09	▲0.08
Margin of victory		37,767	22.23	▲4.84
Turnout		171,705	76.52	▲0.60
Total valid votes		169,858		
Registered electors		224,398		▲5.70
DMK gain from AIADMK		Swing	▲7.63	

=== Assembly election 2016 ===
2016 Tamil Nadu Legislative Assembly election : Ambur
Party	Candidate	Votes	%	±%
AIADMK	R. Balasubramani	79,182	49.16	New
MNMK	V. R. Nazeer Ahmed	51,176	31.77	▼12.24
Super Nation Party	Madar Khaleellur Rahman	7,640	4.74	New
DMDK	R. Vasu	7,043	4.37	New
BJP	K. Venkatesan	5,760	3.58	▼0.83
PMK	M. Ameen Basha	4,643	2.88	New
NOTA	None of the above	1,632	1.01	New
BSP	N. Sundar	967	0.60	▼0.47
Margin of victory		28,006	17.39	▲13.68
Turnout		161,179	75.92	▼1.80
Total valid votes		161,075		
Rejected ballots		104	0.06	▲0.03
Registered electors		212,306		▲20.27
AIADMK gain from MNMK		Swing	▲5.15	

=== Assembly election 2011 ===
2011 Tamil Nadu Legislative Assembly election : Ambur
Party	Candidate	Votes	%	±%
MNMK	A. Aslam Basha	60,361	44.01	New
INC	J. Vijay Elanchezian	55,270	40.30	New
Independent	E. Sampath	6,553	4.78	
BJP	G. Venkatesan	6,047	4.41	New
Independent	V. Shameel Ahmed	1,752	1.28	
Independent	C. Gopi	1,485	1.08	
BSP	N. Sundar	1,468	1.07	New
Independent	S. A. Hameed	1,414	1.03	
IJK	P. Baseer Ahmed	1,074	0.78	New
INL	N. Syed Badruddin	974	0.71	New
Margin of victory		5,091	3.71	▼15.53
Turnout		137,197	77.72	▲13.30
Total valid votes		137,149		
Rejected ballots		48	0.03	▲0.03
Registered electors		176,519		▲82.44
MNMK gain from DMK		Swing	▼11.16	

=== Assembly election 1971 ===
1971 Tamil Nadu Legislative Assembly election : Ambur
Party	Candidate	Votes	%	±%
DMK	M. Panneerselvam	32,937	55.17	▼1.18
INC	M. Adimoolam	21,449	35.93	New
Independent	V. K. Damodaran	5,129	8.59	
Margin of victory		11,488	19.24	▲0.30
Turnout		62,330	64.42	▼3.29
Total valid votes		59,697		
Registered electors		96,754		▲11.10
DMK hold		Swing		

=== Assembly election 1967 ===
1967 Madras State Legislative Assembly election : Ambur
Party	Candidate	Votes	%	±%
DMK	M. Panneerselvam	31,554	56.35	New
INC	P. Rajagopal	20,947	37.41	▼16.32
RPI	A. T. Velayutham	3,499	6.25	New
Margin of victory		10,607	18.94	▼1.13
Turnout		58,966	67.71	▲5.65
Total valid votes		56,000		
Registered electors		87,087		▲8.22
DMK gain from INC		Swing	▲2.62	

=== Assembly election 1962 ===
1962 Madras State Legislative Assembly election : Ambur
Party	Candidate	Votes	%	±%
INC	P. Rajagopal	25,505	53.73	▲17.33
RPI	S. R. Munusamy	15,979	33.66	New
Independent	M. Adimoolam	5,988	12.61	
Margin of victory		9,526	20.07	▲19.67
Turnout		49,939	62.06	▼8.36
Total valid votes		47,472		
Registered electors		80,473		▼50.17
INC hold		Swing		

=== Assembly election 1957 ===
1957 Madras State Legislative Assembly election : Ambur
Party	Candidate	Votes	%	±%
INC	V. K. Krishnamurthy	25,562	22.48	New
Independent	Sampangi Naidu	25,105	22.07	New
Independent	S. R. Munusami	17,047	14.99	New
INC	A. M. Rathanasami	15,842	13.93	New
Independent	Athimeolam	15,585	13.70	New
Independent	M. B. Rajagopal Naidu	14,592	12.83	New
Margin of victory		457	0.40	
Turnout		113,733	70.42	
Total valid votes		113,733		
Registered electors		161,510		
INC win (new seat)				
