= P. Rajagopal (Ambur MLA) =

Indian politician

P. Rajagopal was an Indian politician and former Member of the Legislative Assembly of Tamil Nadu. He was elected to the Tamil Nadu Legislative Assembly as an Indian National Congress candidate from Ambur constituency in 1962 election.

== Electoral performance ==
Election	Constituency	Political party	Result	Vote %	Opposition			Ref
Election	Constituency	Political party	Result	Vote %	Candidate	Political party	Vote %	Ref
1962	Ambur	INC	Won	53.73%	S. R. Munusamy	RPI	33.66%	
1967	Ambur	INC	Lost	37.41%	M. Panneerselvam	DMK	56.35%	
