= K. Balasubramanian =

Indian politician

K. Balasubramaniam was an Indian politician and former Member of the Legislative Assembly of Tamil Nadu. He was elected to the Tamil Nadu legislative assembly from Sirkazhi constituency as an All India Anna Dravida Munnetra Kazhagam candidate in 1980, and 1984 elections.
