= M. Sakthi (Sirkazhi MLA) =

Indian politician

M. Sakthi is an Indian politician and was a member of the Tamil Nadu Legislative Assembly from the Sirkazhi constituency from 2011 to 2016. She represents the All India Anna Dravida Munnetra Kazhagam.
