= Pallavaneswarar Temple =

Shiva temple in Tamil Nadu, India

Coordinates: 11°08′48″N 79°49′46″E

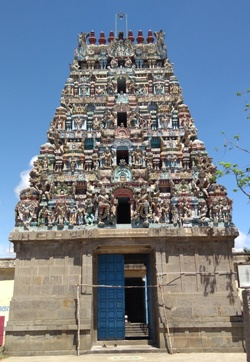
Pallavaneswarar Temple Rajagopura

Pallavaneswarar Temple (பல்லவனேஸ்வரர் கோயில்) is a Hindu temple located in the town of Poombuhar, Mayiladuthurai district, an archaeological site in Tamil Nadu, India. The temple is dedicated to Shiva. It is situated on the birthplace of Saivite saint Pattinathar. The presiding deity is Shiva. He is called as Pallavaneswarar. His consort is known as Soundaryanayaki.

== Significance ==
It is one of the shrines of the 275 Paadal Petra Sthalams - Shiva Sthalams glorified in the early medieval Tevaram poems by Tamil Saivite Nayanar Tirugnanasambandar. A Pallava king is believed to have attained salvation in this place.

== Structure ==
In front of the rajagopura, temple tank is found. At the left of the sanctum sanctorum shrines of goddess and Palliyarai are found. Nandi and balipeeta are also found here. In the prakara shrines of Pattinattar, Vinayaka, Subramania and Chandikesvara are found. In the kosta of the presiding deity Dakshinamurti, Lingodbhava, Brahma and Durga are found.

== Literary mention ==
Tirugnanasambandar describes the feature of the deity as:

பச்சை மேனியர் பிச்சைகொள்பவர்

பட்டினத்துறை பல்லவனீச்சரத்
திச்சையா யிருப்பார்

இவர்தன்மை யறிவாரார்.

== Kumbhabhishekham ==
Inscriptions pertaining to the conduct of Kumbhabhishekham of this temple are found. They were held on 20 August 1958, 5 April 1995 and 17 March 2008.

== Photogallery ==
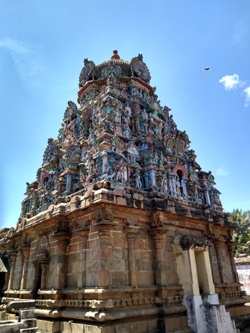
Vimana of the presiding deity

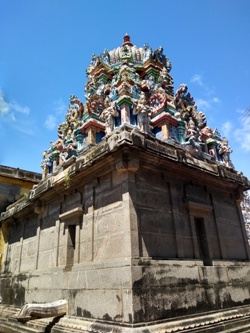
Vimana of the goddess
