= R. Chandrasekar =

Indian politician

R. Chandrasekar is an Indian politician from Tamil Nadu. He was elected to the 14th Tamil Nadu Legislative Assembly from the Manapparai constituency in 2011 and retained his seat in the 2016 elections. He represents the AIADMK (All India Anna Dravida Munnetra Kazhagam) party.
