= Manithaneya Makkal Katchi =

- Abbreviation: MMK
- President: M. H. Jawahirullah
- Secretary: P. Abdul Samad
- Founded: 7 February 2009 (17 years ago)
- Headquarters: 7, Vadamaraicoir Street Mannady, Chennai, Tamil Nadu, India.
- Student wing: SamugaNeethi Manavar Iyakkam
- Youth wing: Youth wing of MMK
- Labour wing: Manithaneya makkal katchi
- Ideology: Social democracy Social justice Egalitarianism
- ECI status: Unrecognized registered party
- Alliance: SPA (2014–2023, 2026–present); INDIA (2023–2025); UPA (2016–2019); AIADMK led Alliance (2011–2014); Manithaneya Makkal Katchi (2009)
- Seats in Rajya Sabha: 0 / 245
- Seats in Lok Sabha: 0 / 543
- Seats in Tamil Nadu Legislative Assembly: 1 / 234
- Number of states and union territories in government: 0 / 31

Election symbol
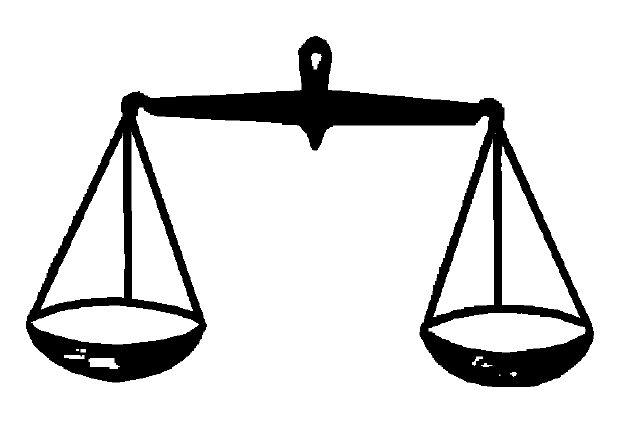

Party flag

Website
- http://mmkinfo.com/

Manithaneya Makkal Katchi (MMK) is a regional political party in Tamil Nadu, India, founded on 7 February 2009. It functions as the political wing of the prominent social organisation, the Tamil Nadu Muslim Munnetra Kazhagam (TMMK). Headquartered in Chennai, the party was established to advocate for the rights of minorities as well as backward classes and marginalized communities, running on an ideology of social democracy, social justice and Secularism.

In the 2009 election, Manithaneya makkal Katchi contested with railway engine symbol. During the 2011 Tamil Nadu Legislative Assembly elections, the party joined the All India Anna Dravida Munnetra Kazhagam alliance and was allocated three seats to contest, with candle as electoral symbol. Jawahirullah won in Ramanathapuram and A. Aslam Basha did so in Ambur.

== Electoral history ==
For the 2016 Tamil Nadu Legislative Assembly elections, the party joined the Dravida Munnetra Kazhagam (DMK) alliance and was allocated four constituencies to contest and Contested in Cup and Saucer Symbol and won none of the seats in that election.

In the 2021 Tamil Nadu Legislative Assembly elections, the party again contested in alliance with Dravida Munnetra Kazhagam and won seats in Papanasam and Manapparai under DMK's Rising Sun Symbol.

== See also ==
- Tamil Nadu Muslim Munnetra Kazagham

== Sources ==
- Tamil Nadu: The Rise of Islamist Fundamentalism, by P.G. Rajamohan, South Asia Terrorism Portal
- "Lift ban on SIMI: TMMK". The Hindu. 25 September 2007. Archived from the original on 17 February 2007.
