= M. Panneerselvam =

Indian politician

M. Pannerselvam was an Indian politician and former Member of the Legislative Assembly of Tamil Nadu. He was elected to the Tamil Nadu legislative assembly as a Dravida Munnetra Kazhagam candidate from Sirkazhi constituency in the 1967 and 1971 elections.

== Electoral performance ==
Election	Constituency	Political party	Result	Vote %	Opposition			Ref
Election	Constituency	Political party	Result	Vote %	Candidate	Political party	Vote %	Ref
1967	Ambur	DMK	Won	56.35%	P. Rajagopal	INC	37.41%	
1971	Ambur	DMK	Won	55.17%	M. Adimoolam	INC	35.93%	
