= Divya Desam =

Canonical group of Vaishnavite temples of great significance

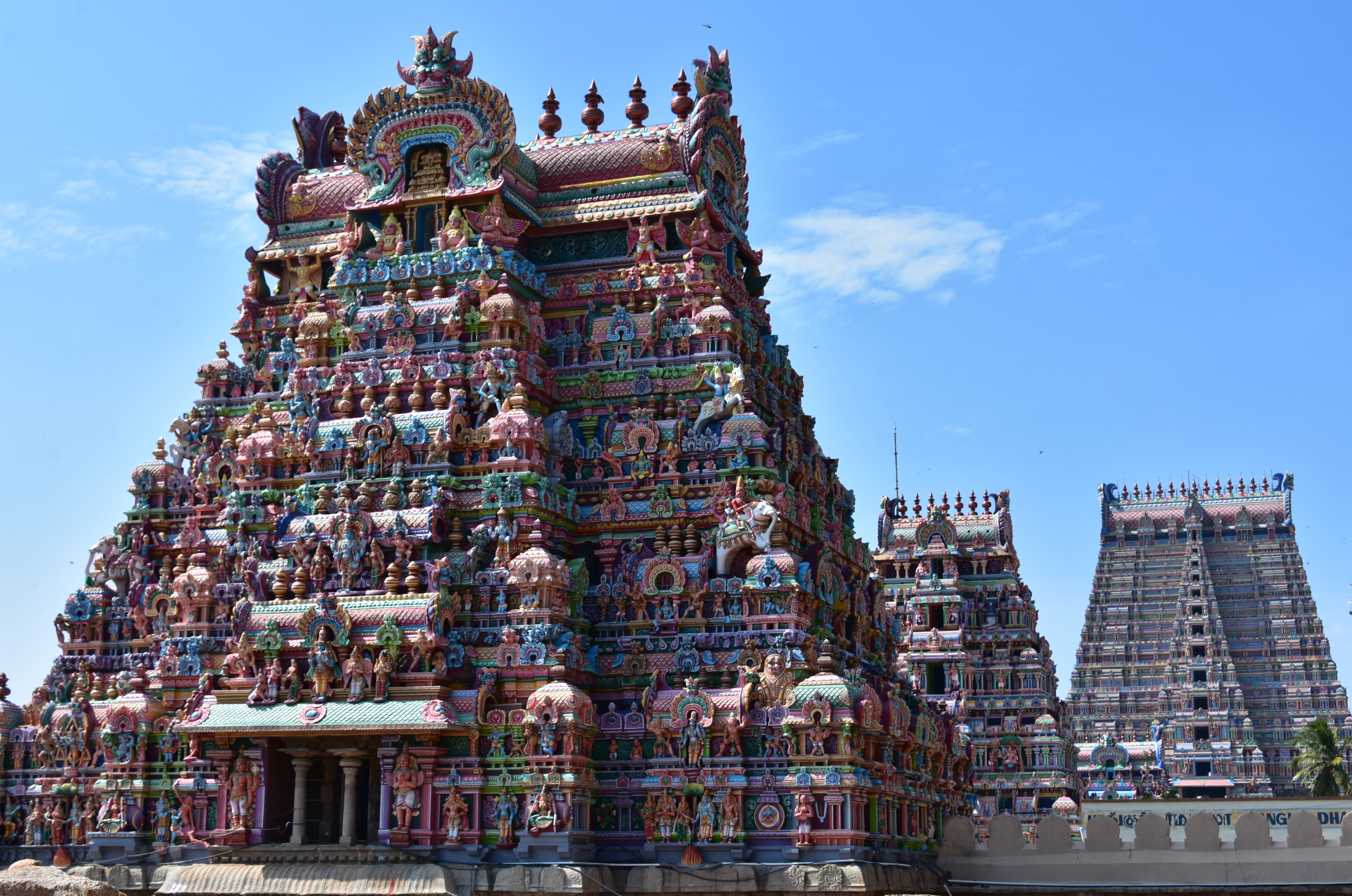
The Ranganathaswamy Temple, located in Srirangam, is the first of the Divya Desams.

Divya Desam (Sanskrit: दिव्यदेशम्, Tamil: திவ்ய தேசம்) or Vaishnava Divya Desams are the 108 Vishnu and Lakshmi temples that are mentioned in the works of the Alvars, the poet-saints of the Sri Vaishnava tradition. By comparison, the Paadal Petra Sthalam are the 276 Shiva temples glorified in the works of the Shaiva Nayanars.

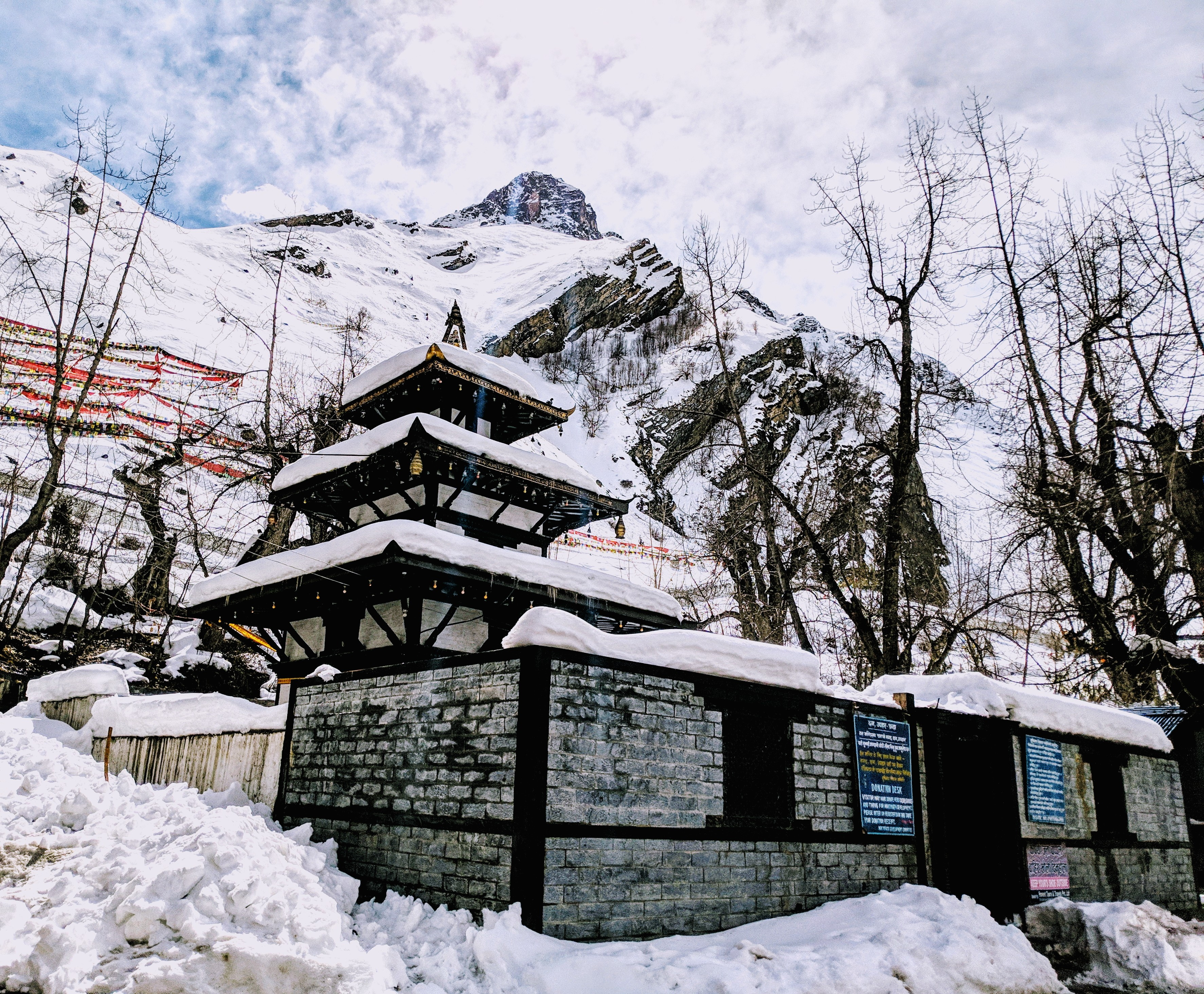
Muktinath Temple, Nepal is the only Divya Desam outside India

Of the 108 temples, 105 are in India, one is in Nepal, and the last two are believed to be outside the earth, in Tirupparkatal/Kṣīra Sāgara and Vaikuntham. In India, they are spread across the states of Tamil Nadu (84), Kerala (11), Andhra Pradesh (2), Gujarat (1), Uttar Pradesh (4), and Uttarakhand (3). Muktinath, or Thiru Salagramam, is the only Divya Desam outside of India, in the Lower Mustang region of Nepal. Tamil Nadu is home to the most number of Divya Desams with 25 of them being located in the Chennai Metropolitan Area. The Divya Desams are revered by the 12 Alvars in the Naalayira Divya Prabandham, a collection of 4,000 Tamil verses. The Divya Desams follow either Tenkalai or Vadakalai modes of worship.

== Etymology ==
In Sanskrit, divya means "divine" and desam indicates "realm" (temple).

== Alvars and Divya Prabandham ==
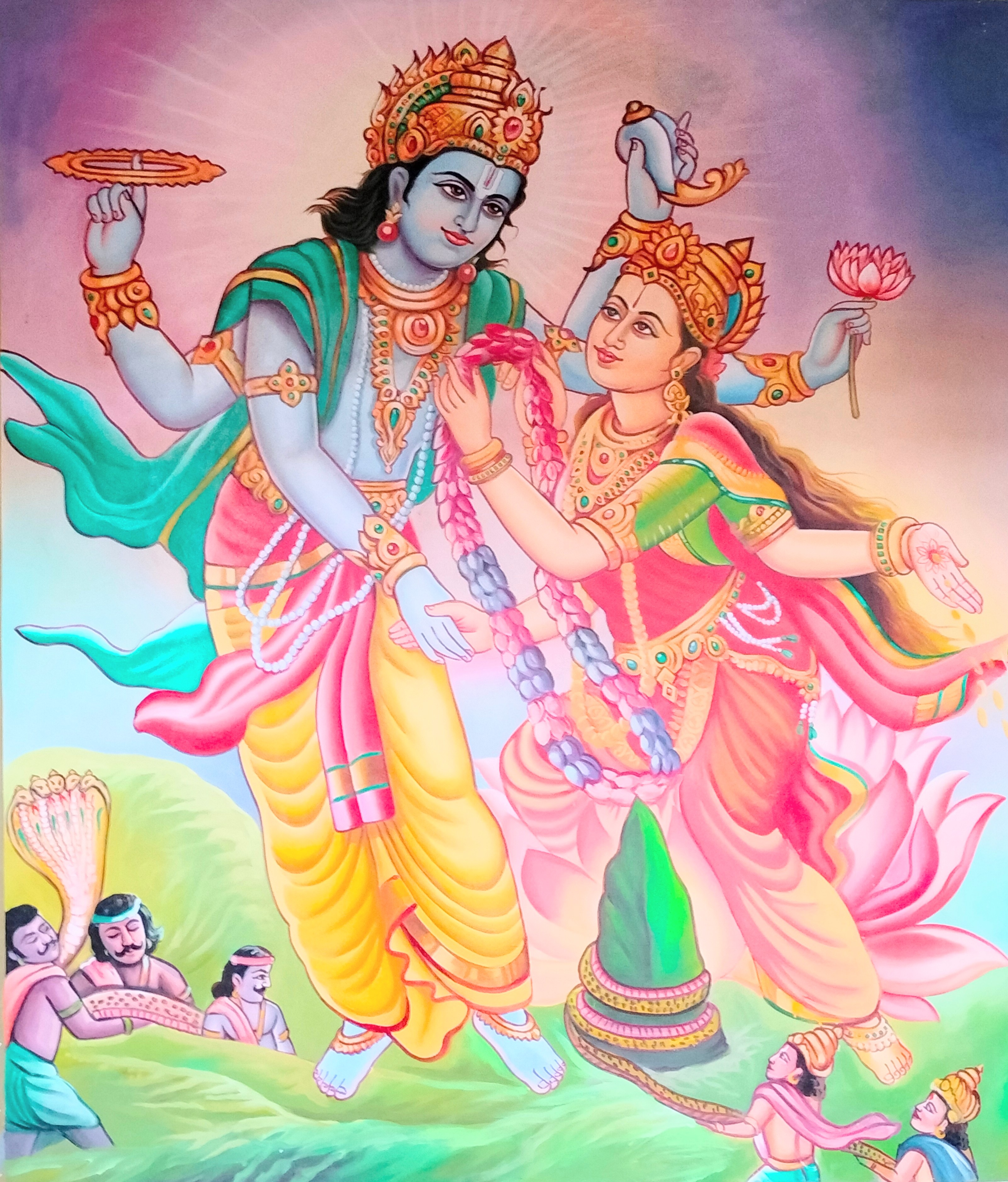
Vishnu and Lakshmi, the revered divine couple venerated in most Divya Desams

The word Alvar in Tamil, means "the immersed", referring to their deep devotion of God. Alvars are considered to be the twelve poet-saints of Vishnu, who were instrumental in popularising Vaishnavism during the 5th-8th centuries CE. The religious works of these saints in Tamil, their hymns of love and devotion, are compiled as the Naalayira Divya Prabandham, containing 4000 verses and the 108 temples revered in their songs are classified as Divya Desams. The saints had different origins and belonged to different varnas. According to tradition, the first three Alvars (mudhal alvargal), Poigai, Bhuthathalvar, Peyalvar and Andal were said to be born "out of divinity", Tirumalisai was the son of a sage, Thondaradi, Mathurakavi, Periyalvar were of Brahmin birth, Kulasekhara from the Kshatriya community, Nammalvar was from a cultivator family, Tirupanalvar from the Tamil panar community and Tirumangai was from the kalvar community.

The Divya Suri Saritra by Garuda-Vahana Pandita (11th century CE), Guruparamparaprabhavam by Pinbaragiya Perumal Jeeyar, Periya tiru mudi adaivu by Anbillai Kandadiappan, Yatindra Pranava Prabavam by Pillai Lokam Jeeyar, commentaries on the Naalayira Divya Prabandam, Guru Parampara (lineage of Gurus) texts, temple records and inscriptions give a detailed account of the Alvars and their works. According to these texts, the saints are considered to be incarnations of attributes of Vishnu. Poigai is considered to be an incarnation of Panchajanya (Krishna's conch), Bhoothath of Kaumodaki (Vishnu's mace), Peyalvar of Nandaka (Vishnu's sword), Thirumalisai of Sudarshana Chakra (Vishnu's discus), Nammalvar of Vishvaksena (Vishnu's commander), Madhurakavi of Vainatheya (Garuda), Kulasekhara of Kaustubha (Vishnu's gemstone), Periyalvar of Garuda (Vishnu's demigod eagle), Andal of Bhudevi (Vishnu's wife, Lakshmi, in her form as Bhudevi), Thondaradippodi of Vanamalai (Vishnu's garland), Thiruppaan of Srivatsa (An auspicious mark on Vishnu's chest) and Thirumangai of Sharanga (Vishnu's bow). The songs of Prabandham are sung in several Vishnu temples of Tamil Nadu daily and also during festivals.

== Significance ==
In Hindu texts, these temples are often referred to as Bhuloka Vaikuntham, which in Tamil means heavens on earth. Each of the Divya Desam has its own significance related to Sri Vaishnava legend. Almost all of these temples have separate shrines for Vishnu and Lakshmi.

== List of Divya Desams ==
The 106 earthly Divya Desam temples are spread over the Indian states of Tamil Nadu (84), Kerala (11), Uttar Pradesh (4), Uttarakhand (3), Andhra Pradesh (2) and Gujarat (1), and the country of Nepal (1). The last two are believed to be outside earthly realms.

S.NO	Name	Location	Photo	Presiding deities	Notes
01	Ranganathaswamy Temple, Srirangam	Srirangam, Trichy district Tamil Nadu; 10.8625°N 78.689722°E		Ranganathaswamy Perumal and Ranganayaki Thayar	The Srirangam temple is often listed as the largest functioning Hindu temple in the world. The temple occupies an area of 156 acres (631,000 m^{2}) with a perimeter of 4,116m (10,710 feet) making it the largest temple in India and one of the largest religious complexes in the world. The annual 21 day festival of Vaikuntha Ekadashi, conducted during the Tamil month of Margaḻi (December–January) attracts 1 million visitors. The temple legend (Sthalapuranam) says that the Vishnu idol was first worshipped by Lord Brahma, then Ikshvaku, then Lord Rama and then gifted to Vibhishana. Vibhishana wanted to keep the idol in his kingdom Lanka, but the idol was stuck on the Srirangam island, and Vishnu promised he will look after Vibhishana by facing south. Lord Vishnu is worshipped here as Ranganatha, also called Periyaperumal, Namperumal or Azhagiyamanavalan. His wife Lakshmi is worshipped as Ranganayaki, also called Thaayaar, Ranganachiyar or Periyapiraatti.
02	Thirukoḻi	Uraiyur, Trichy district Tamil Nadu; 10.82°N 78.67°E		Kamalavalli Nachiyar and Aḻagiya Manavala Perumal	The temple is locally called Nachiyar Koil (to be distinguished from Thirunaraiyur) and is one of the few Divya Desams where the goddess is offered prominence over Vishnu. This temple has no procession idol (utsavar) for Vishnu, as it is believed that the Srirangam idol is the utsavar of Uraiyur. Goddess Lakshmi is worshipped as Kamalavalli The temple is the birthplace of Thiruppaan Alvar, one of the twelve Alvars. In Srirangam, the yearly birth festival of Thiruppaan Alvar is celebrated with the Vishvarupa Darshanam of Ranganatha at the sanctum on the occasion of his birthday. The utsavar of Tiruppan Alvar is taken from the temple to Srirangam.
03	Thirukkarambanoor	Uthamarkoil, Tiruchirappalli district Tamil Nadu; 10.49°N 78.81°E		Purushottama Nayaki and Purushottama Perumal	This rare temple is dedicated to the Hindu Trimurti (trinity) namely Vishnu, Shiva, and Brahma. According to Hindu legend, the temple is believed to have been constructed by Janaka, the king of Mithila and the father of Sita from the epic Ramayana. Tirumangai Alvar is believed to have resided in the temple to build the surrounding walls of the Srirangam Ranganathaswamy temple.
04	Pundarikakshan Perumal Koil	Thiruvellarai, Trichy district Tamil Nadu; 10.96°N 78.67°E		Pankaja Nayaki and Pundarikaksha Perumal	The Pundarikakshan Perumal temple is believed to have been built by the Pallava king Dantivarman (796–847 CE). A swastika-shaped temple tank built during 800 CE is present in the south-western corner of the street around the temple. It has four stepped gateways, each having 51 steps. The tank is believed to have been built by Kamban Araiyan during the reign of Dantivarman. In modern times, it is maintained by the Department of Archaeology of the Government of Tamil Nadu. The temple complex covers an area of 2.62 ha (6.5 acres), while the tank covers an area of 0.1256 ha (0.310 acres). The chariot festival is unique in the state as a community feast is offered by several individuals and committees, a custom many centuries old.
05	Vadivaḻagiya Nambi Perumal Koil	Anbil, Trichy district Tamil Nadu; 10.867735°N 78.882171°E		Saundaryavalli and Sundararaja Perumal	King Sundara Chola, who ruled the area, was a devotee of the temple, and during each of his innumerable victories in wars, he showered a lot of wealth on this temple. His prime minister Anirudha Brahmarayar is believed to be from Anbil, the village where the temple is located. The copper plates having the records from the Chola period from Anbil indicate generous contribution from the Medieval Cholas indicate various gifts to the temple.
06	Appakkudathaan Perumal Koil	Koviladi, Tanjore district Tamil Nadu; 10.839307°N 78.889073°E		Indravalli and Appakudatthan Perumal	The temple has inscriptions from the 18th year of the reign of Aditya Chola. The temple is one of the five Pancharanga Kshetrams, a group of five Hindu temples on the banks of the Kaveri River dedicated to Ranganatha, a form of Vishnu.
07	Hara Saabha Vimocchana Perumal Temple	Kandiyur, Thanjavur district Tamil Nadu; 10.860255°N 79.108891°E		Kamalavalli and Hara Saabha Vimochana Perumal	Since Vishnu relieved (vimochana) the curse (shāpa) of Shiva (also called Hara), the temple is called Hara Sābha Vimochana Temple.
08	Thirukoodalur	Aduthurai, Thanjavur district, Tamil Nadu; 10.925152°N 79.203532°E		Padmasani and Jagathrakshaga Perumal	The river goddess Kaveri wanted to cleanse herself, and approached the Hindu god Brahma, who advised her to worship Vishnu. She is believed to have worshipped Vishnu at this place, and received relief. A parrot that was devoted to Vishnu was shot down in the nearby forest. Vishnu rescued the parrot and apprised him of his previous birth. Thus, it is believed that Vishnu descends here for all forms of life. Vishnu is also believed to have appeared for sage Nandaka.
09	Thirukavithalam	Kabisthalam, Thanjavur district, Tamil Nadu; 10.946890°N 79.256512°E		Ramamanivalli and Gajendra Varadha Perumal	Based on Gajendra Moksha, Vishnu is believed to have saved Gajendra the elephant also called Indradyumna, from the crocodile called Huhu. This temple was Sage Parasara and Lord Hanuman. The temple is one of the Panchakanna (Krishnaranya) Kshetrams, the five holy temples associated with Krishna, an avatar of Vishnu.
10	Thiruppullamboothangudi	Pullabhoothangudi, Thanjavur district, Tamil Nadu; 10.971596°N 79.303415°E		Hemambujavalli and Rama Perumal	Rama is believed to have appeared for Sita, and the temple is believed to be the place where Rama performed the last rites of the eagle king Jatayu.
11	Thiruaadhanur	Adanur, Thanjavur district, Tamil Nadu; 10.976470°N 79.313454°E		Ranganayaki Thayar and Andalukkum Aiyyan Perumal	Vishnu is worshipped as Andalukkum-aiyyan and is believed to have appeared for an affluent devotee trying to save his idol. It is also believed that the presiding deity appeared for Kamadhenu, the divine cow, and also for Tirumangai Alvar, the saint poet of the 8th century.
12	Thirukudanthai	Kumbakonam, Thanjavur district, Tamil Nadu; 10.959649°N 79.374999°E		Komalavalli and Aravamuda Perumal	The temple is called Ubaya Pradhana Kshetram as the mulavar (presiding deity) and utsavar (festive deity) enjoy the same importance. It is believed that the presiding deity asked Nathamuni to compile the four thousand verses of Naalayira Divya Prabandham at this place. The twin temple chariots weigh 300 t (660,000 lb) each and are next only in size to the ones in Thyagaraja temple in Thiruvarur and Andal Temple in Srivilliputhur. This temple is along Kaveri and is one of the Pancharanga Kshetrams.
13	Thiruvinnagar	Tirunageswaram, Thanjavur district, Tamil Nadu; 10.961570°N 79.432080°E		Bhumidevi and Uppiliappan Perumal	It is believed that Vishnu appeared as Uppiliappan to marry sage Hemarishi's daughter, who was Lakshmi's reincarnation. Since the sage stated that his girl was too young to offer him food with salt, Vishnu agreed to accept an offering without salt, hence the name Uppiliappan (the one who does not eat salt)
14	Thirunaraiyur	Nachiyar Kovil, Thiruvarur district, Tamil Nadu; 10.915844°N 79.445554°E		Vanchulavalli and Srinivasa Perumal	According to local lore, Vishnu was of the view that during Kali Yuga, men would have to listen to women. Hence, he decided that he would first set an example and listen to the goddess here. During all festive occasions, the first rights are reserved for Goddess Lakshmi as Vanchulavalli, who moves ahead, while Vishnu as Srinivasa follows her. Even the food is first served to Lakshmi, and then to Srinivasa. The stone Garuda image in the temple used during the festive occasions is believed to increase in weight seeking 4, 8, 16, 32, 64, and 128 people in succession when the procession comes out of various gates from the sanctum to the main entrance of the temple.
15	Thirucherai	Tirucherai, Thanjavur district, Tamil Nadu; 10.879135°N 79.454402°E		Saranayaki and Saranatha Perumal	Saranathan is believed to have appeared to the river goddess Kaveri, sage Markandeya, and the heaven king Indra. The crown of some of the idol from the Chola period show the influence of Buddhism in the region. The metal image of Sita is believed to be a classic example of Chola Art during the 9th-10th centuries.
16	Thirukannamangai	Thirukannamangai, Thiruvarur district, Tamil Nadu; 10.799552°N 79.586645°E		Abishekavalli and Bhaktavatsala Perumal	The temple is one of the Panchakanna (Krishnaranya) Kshetrams, the five holy temples associated with Krishna, an avatar of Vishnu. The temple also has a statue of the Buddha worshipped in the shrine.
17	Thirukannapuram	Tirukannapuram, Nagapattinam district, Tamil Nadu; 10.868499°N 79.704266°E		Kannapura Nayaki and Sowriraja Perumal	The idol of Vishnu is depicted with silky hair at this locale. Legend has it that he grew the hair to safeguard his devotee's words. The temple is one of the Panchakanna (Krishnaranya) Kshetrams, the five holy temples associated with Krishna, an avatar of Vishnu.
18	Thirukannangudi	Tirukannankudi, Nagapattinam district, Tamil Nadu; 10.757222°N 79.763290°E		Loganayaki and Lokanatha Perumal	The temple is one of the Panchakanna (Krishnaranya) Kshetrams, the five holy temples associated with Krishna, an avatar of Vishnu.
19	Thirunagai	Nagapattinam, Nagapattinam district, Tamil Nadu; 10.759830°N 79.843706°E		Saundaryavalli and Sundararaja Perumal	The tributary of river Cauvery, Odambokki, passes close to the temple and the river is also called Virutha Kaveri. This leads to one of the names of presiding deity, "Kaveri Thuraivan". The present day Nagapattinam is believed to have been a forest, historically named Sundararinyam. During the Treta Yuga, this is the forest where Dhruva performed a penance to appease Vishnu.
20	Thiruthanjai Mamanikoil	Thanjavur, Thanjavur district, Tamil Nadu; 10.815669°N 79.138677°E		Raktapankajavalli and Neelamegha Perumal	Unlike other Divya Desams where a single shrine is referred, this set of temples is referred together in all the pasurams (verses). During the Treta Yuga, there were three demons by the names of Tanchakan, Tantakan, and Kacamukan who were blessed by Shiva, and became very powerful. They grew arrogant and troubled sage Parashara, who was doing penance at this place. Vishnu killed Tanchakan, after whom Thanjavur was named.
20	Manikundram	Thanjavur, Thanjavur district, Tamil Nadu; 10.816923°N 79.137229°E		Ambujavalli and Manikundra Perumal	The temples are located in the banks of the Vennaaru river. Manikundram has a small east facing shrine with the deity and his consort in the same sanctum. All of the pasurams (verses) of Nammalvar and Thirumangai Alvar that mention Thanjai refer to this shrine.
20	Thanjaiyali Nagar	Thanjavur, Thanjavur district, Tamil Nadu; 10.816022°N 79.139155°E		Thanjanayaki and Narasimha Perumal	Thanjiyali Nagar is home to Veera Narasimha Perumal, who has a small east facing shrine with the deity and his consort in the same sanctum. Narasimha is sculpted in a seated posture, giving blessings to sage Markandeya. The tower over the sanctum is called Vedasundara Vimana, and the water body associated with it is called Surya Pushkarani.
21	Thirunandhipura Vinnagaram	Nathan Kovil, Thiruvarur district, Tamil Nadu; 10.922075°N 79.372192°E		Shenbagavalli and Jagannatha Perumal	Nandi, the sacred bull vehicle of Shiva, is believed to have got his curses relieved by worshipping Vishnu here, and hence the place is called Nandipuram and Nandhipura Vinnagaram. It is also believed that king Sibi worshipped Vishnu at this place.
22	Thiruvelliyangudi	Thiruvelliyangudi, Thanjavur district, Tamil Nadu; 11.056687°N 79.443095°E		Maragadhavalli and Kolavilli Rama Perumal	The temple is counted as Vaishnava Shukra Kshetra as Vishnu appeared as a beautiful idol to please his devotee Shukra (Venus). The place derived its name Thiruvelliyangudi hence and the presiding deity is also referred to as Velliyan. It is believed that Vishnu appeared in Kalyana Kolam (marriage posture) to Parasara, Markandeya, Maya, Brahma, Shukra, and Bhudevi. To de-stress or relieve Vishnu, his mount or vahana, the eagle Garuda, holds the conch and the Sudarshana chakra of Vishnu, making this the only temple where Garuda is depicted in such a posture.
23	Thiruvazhundur	Theranzhdur, Mayiladuthurai district, Tamil Nadu; 11.046532°N 79.579468°E		Senkamalavalli and Sri; Devadiraja Perumal	In a Hindu legend, Brahma, the creator deity, drove away the cattle belonging to Krishna, an avatar of Vishnu. Krishna created another herd. Realising that the herd belonged to Krishna, Brahma apologised, and wished Krishna to set his abode at this place. Since Krishna appeared for the cattle and settled here, the presiding deity is called Amaruviappan (the one who is flanked by cattle). Following the legend, the presiding deity in the sanctum is portrayed with cattle surrounding him.
24	Thiruchirupuliyur	Thirusirupuliyur, Thiruvarur district, Tamil Nadu; 10.991202°N 79.669440°E		Dayanayaki and Krupasamudra Perumal	Shiva ordered the sage Vyaghrapada to perform penance at Srirangam, requesting the god Vishnu to give him a place in his abode, Vaikuntha. Vyaghrapada was joined by sage Patanjali in his journey. Because of his poor eyesight, the sages instead went southward, lost their way and reached Krupa Samudram, modern day Tirusirupuliyur. They prayed to Vishnu to come from Srirangam to grant them moksha (divine liberation). Vishnu is also believed to have appeared for sage Vyasa at this place.
25	Thiruthalaichanga Nanmadiyam	Thalachangadu, Mayiladuthurai district, Tamil Nadu; 11.129789°N 79.785252°E		Thalaichanga Nachiyar and Chandrasaabahara Perumal	The moon deity Chandra once conducted a sacrifice called the rajasuya yajna, which was attended by all the celestial deities. Tara, the wife of Brihaspati (Jupiter) was attracted by Chandra. Brihaspati appealed to Vishnu on the event and cursed Chandra to have leprosy. Tara bore Budha (Mercury) from Chandra and since his birth had resulted from an illicit relationship, Budha hated his father. To propitiate himself of the curse, Chandra started worshipping Vishnu in this place.
26	Thiruindalur	Indalur, Mayiladuthurai district, Tamil Nadu; 11.109733°N 79.646232°E		Parimala Ranganayaki and Sri; Parimala Ranganatha Perumal	According to Hindu legend, this site is where the moon god, Chandra is believed to have been relieved of his curse. Indu means moon, and the place Tiruindaloor derives its name from the legend. Chandra, worshipped Vishnu, who appeared to please his devotee.
27	Thirukkavalambadi	Thirunangur, Mayiladuthurai district, Tamil Nadu; 11.1769°N 79.7824°E		Senkamala Nachiyar and Gopala Krishna Perumal	Krishna, the eighth incarnation of Vishnu, and his consort Satyabhama, chose this location for their garden, as it resembled the one in the palace of the king of celestial deities, Indra. Kavalam indicates elephant, and padi indicates place - it is believed that Krishna saved an elephant at this place leading to the name of the temple. The event is described in the verses of Tirumangai Alvar in the Naalayira Divya Prabandham.
28	Thirukazhicheerama Vinnagaram	Sirkazhi, Mayiladuthurai district, Tamil Nadu; 11.240964°N 79.731689°E		Lokanayaki and Trivikrama Perumal	Thirumangai Aḻvar was requested by the Shaiva poetSambandar to praise God through pasurams. The deity in the temple is praised as "Man alantha tadalan", meaning the one who measured the land. The name Tadalan is in honour of Trivikrama (Vamana) form and the mulavar (central deity) fixed in the central shrine is in this form. The presiding deity, Trivikrama, appeared for sage Ashtakoma.
29	Thiruarimeya Vinnagaram	Thirunangur, Mayiladuthurai district, Tamil Nadu; 11.17768°N 79.78152°E		Amrudhagadavalli and Kudamudakoothan Perumal	The Hindu god Shiva is believed to have started dancing (tandava) in fury at this place after the death of his consort Sati during the yagna (sacrifice) of Daksha. Each time his lock of hair touched the ground, there were eleven other forms of Shiva who appeared. The celestial deities were worried that if the dance continues, it would result in the decimation of all of creation. They prayed to Vishnu for help, who appeared at this place. On seeing Vishnu, Shiva's anger reduced, and he requested Vishnu to appear in eleven forms like he had. On his request, Vishnu appeared in eleven different forms at Tirunangur. The eleven places where Vishnu appeared are believed to be where the eleven temples in Tirunangur are located.
30	Thiruvanpurushothamam	Thirunangur, Mayiladuthurai district, Tamil Nadu; 11.178783°N 79.776690°E		Purushotthama Nayaki and Purushottama Perumal	Same as Thiruarimeya Vinnagaram.
31	Thirusemponsaikoil	Thirunangur, Mayiladuthurai district, Tamil Nadu; 11.178446°N 79.779651°E		Sweda Pushpavalli and Hemaranganatha Perumal	Same as Thiruarimeya Vinnagaram.
32	Thirumanimadakoil	Thirunangur, Mayiladuthurai district, Tamil Nadu; 11.173971°N 79.776872°E		Pundareegavalli and Sashvatha Deepaya Narayana Perumal	Same as Thiruarimeya Vinnagaram.
33	Thiruvaikunta Vinnagaram	Thirunangur, Mayiladuthurai district, Tamil Nadu; 11.179804°N 79.778267°E		Vaikundavalli and Vaikundanatha Perumal	Same as Thiruarimeya Vinnagaram.
34	Thiruvali	Thiruvali, Mayiladuthurai district, Tamil Nadu; 11.202979°N 79.774538°E		Amrudhagadavalli and Kedarapathivaraya Perumal	Associated with Narasimha's killing of Hiranyakashipu, and his pacification by Lakshmi and Prahlada sitting on his lap.
34	Thirunagari	Thirunagari, Mayiladuthurai district, Tamil Nadu; 11.226354°N 79.800335°E		Amurdha Valli and Devaraja Perumal	Regarded to be the site where Vishnu offered a vision to Thirumangai Alvar and his wife.
35	Thiruthevanarthogai	Thirunangur, Mayiladuthurai district, Tamil Nadu; 11.196842°N 79.775504°E		Samudradanaya and Devanayaka Perumal	Same as Thiruarimeya Vinnagaram.
36	Thiruthetriambalam	Thirunangur, Mayiladuthurai district, Tamil Nadu; 11.17302°N 79.7951°E		Rakthapankajavalli and Lakshmiranga Perumal	Same as Thiruarimeya Vinnagaram.
37	Thirumanikoodam	Thirunangur, Mayiladuthurai district, Tamil Nadu; 11.177415°N 79.777838°E		Boonayagi and Varadharaja Perumal	Same as Thiruarimeya Vinnagaram.
38	Thiruvellakulam	Thirunangur, Mayiladuthurai district, Tamil Nadu; 11.190106°N 79.764929°E		Padmavathi and Srinivasa Perumal	Same as Thiruarimeya Vinnagaram.
39	Thiruparthanpalli	Parthanpalli, Mayiladuthurai district, Tamil Nadu; 11.169952°N 79.797515°E		Tamarai Nayagi and Taamaraiyaal Kelvan Perumal	Same as Thiruarimeya Vinnagaram, and also a site where the Pandava prince Arjuna prayed to Lord Krishna.
40	Thiruchitrakoodam	Chidambaram, Cuddalore district, Tamil Nadu11.399207°N 79.693364°E		Pundareekavalli and Govindaraja Perumal	The shrine has close connections with the Govindaraja temple in Tirupati, dating back to the saint Ramanuja of the 11-12th century. Ramanuja fled to Tirupati with the utsava (festival idol) of the temple to escape Shaiva persecution.
41	Thiruvanthipuram	Thiruvanthipuram, Cuddalore district, Tamil Nadu11.745099°N 79.709351°E		Hemambujavalli and Devanatha Perumal	A number of sages bore witness to Mahavishnu in his resplendent form, with his weapons Sudarshana Chakra (discus), Panchajanya (conch) and the Kaumodaki (mace) gracing his arms.
42	Thirukkoyilur	Thirukoyilur, Kallakurichi district, Tamil Nadu11.967006°N 79.202479°E		Pushpavalli and Trivikrama Perumal	The temple is believed to be the place where the first three Alvars, the Vaishnava saints, namely, Poigai Alvar, Bhoothathalvar, and Peyalvar attained salvation. The temple is one of the Panchakanna (Krishnaranya) Kshetrams, the five holy temples associated with Krishna, an avatar of Vishnu.
43	Thirukkachi - Atthigiri	Kanchipuram, Kanchipuram district, Tamil Nadu12.819137°N 79.724646°E		Perundevi Thayar and Varadharaja Perumal	One of the greatest Hindu scholars of the Vaishnava Vishishtadvaita philosophy, Ramanuja, is believed to have resided in this temple. The Vishnu idol in this temple was originally made by Vishwakarma from fig tree wood (atthi) until Muslim invasions forced the wooden idol into hiding and being replaced by the current stone idol. The temple, along with Ekambareswarar Temple and Kamakshi Amman Temple in Kanchipuram, is popularly known as Mumurtivasam (abode of the trio), while Srirangam is referred to as ‘The Koil’ (temple) and Tirupati as the ‘Malai’ (hill).
44	Ashtabujagaram	Kanchipuram, Kanchipuram district, Tamil Nadu12.822736°N 79.710806°E		Padmasani and Ashtabhuja Perumal	Also based on Gajendra Moksha: The elephant Gajendra used to worship Vishnu with the lotuses fetched from the temple tank every day. Once, while picking up a lotus, a crocodile caught the leg of Gajendra, who started calling the name of Vishnu for help. Vishnu sent his discus to kill the crocodile, and relieve the elephant. The presiding deity is addressed by various names like Adikesava Perumal, Gajendra Varadhan, and Chakradharan.
45	Thiruthanka	Kanchipuram, Kanchipuram district, Tamil Nadu12.824382°N 79.705543°E		Maragadhavalli and Deepaprakasa Perumal	Vedanta Desika (1268 - 1369 CE) was an ardent devotee of Deepa Prakasa Temple at Thoppul. The devotion of Desika is mentioned in Saranagathi Deepika in 59 verses. He was born in this kshetra. Vedanta Desika also has a shrine inside the temple. A statue of Hayagriva worshipped by him also has a temple nearby to him.
46	Thiruvelukkai	Kanchipuram, Kanchipuram district, Tamil Nadu12.822197°N 79.706450°E		Amritavalli and Yoga Narasimha Perumal	Narasimha is believed to have appeared here to kill Hiranyakashipu, the demon king. Velukkai is derived from Vel (desire) and irukkai (place of stay), meaning the place where Vishnu desired to stay, which became Velukkai from Velirukkai. Here, Narasimha is called Azhagiya Singar (the handsome lion)
47	Thiruneeragam	Kanchipuram, Kanchipuram district, Tamil Nadu12.839122°N 79.705185°E		Nilamangai Valli and Jagadeesha Perumal	The temple has no presiding deity, but just a festive image probably brought from another shrine. The images of the festival deity, Jagadishvara, facing the east and having four arms, is housed in a hall in the second precinct. The water body associated with the temple is Akrura Tirtham and the vimana is Jagadiswara Vimanam. According to Pillai Perumal Aiyangar in his Nurrettrutiruppatiyantati, Vishnu revealed himself to a sage in the form of a child in a banyan leaf.
48	Thiruppadagam	Kanchipuram, Kanchipuram district, Tamil Nadu12.842726°N 79.696941°E		Rukmini and Pandavadootha Perumal	The temple is considered one of three oldest temples in Kanchipuram, and is believed to have been built by the Pallavas of the late 8th century CE, with later contributions from Medieval Cholas and Vijayanagara kings. The temple is associated with a chapter in Mahabharata when Krishna went to the Kauravas as a peace messenger (called Thoota locally) of the Pandavas.
49	Nilathingal Thundam	Kanchipuram, Kanchipuram district, Tamil Nadu12.847463°N 79.699313°E		Chandrasoodavalli and Chandrasooda Perumal	This shrine is located within the premises of the Ekambareswarar Temple. Shiva once attempted to test the devotion of his consort Parvati by setting her aflame while she meditated under the temple's mango tree. When she prayed for Vishnu's intervention, he seized Shiva's crescent moon, and used its power to douse the divine flame.
50	Thiruooragam	Kanchipuram, Kanchipuram district, Tamil Nadu12.839122°N 79.705185°E		Amudavalli and Trivikrama Perumal	The central shrine of temple is most commonly referred as Peragam, while the smaller shrine where the image of the demigod Adishesha is houses is called Tiruooragam. According to tradition, Mahabali, at the foot of Vamana, could not view the tall form and requested him to produce a smaller form. Vishnu obliged and appeared as a snake in a smaller shrine. The shrine is frequented by childless couple praying for offspring.
51	Thiruvekka	Kanchipuram, Kanchipuram district, Tamil Nadu12.824070°N 79.712462°E		Komalavalli and Yathottakari Perumal	The goddess Saraswati, angry with Brahma, attempted to disrupt his yajna. Vishnu stopped her in these efforts. Defeated, Saraswati took the form of the Vegavati river. As Vishnu interfered the path of the river, it was termed Vegavani, then as Vegannai, which gradually corrupted to Vekka.
52	Thirukkaragam	Kanchipuram, Kanchipuram district, Tamil Nadu12.839122°N 79.705185°E		Padmamani and Karunagara Perumal	The shrine is located on the third precinct of the temple. According to Hindu legend, sage Garga performed his penance at this temple and obtained knowledge. The place thus derived its name Garagaham, which later became Kaaragam. The presiding deity of the shrine is Karunakara Perumal facing north and seated on Adisesha and his consort Padmamani Nachiar. The temple tank associated with it is called Agraya Tirtha and the vimana is called Vamana Vimanam or Ramaya Vimanam.
53	Thirukkarvaanam	Kanchipuram, Kanchipuram district, Tamil Nadu12.839122°N 79.705185°E		Kamalavalli and Neelamega Perumal	The shrine is located in the second precinct of the Ulagalantha Perumal Temple. The presiding Vishnu deity is called Kalvar and faces north, while his consort is Lakshmi as Kamalavalli Thayar. Gauri Tatakam and Taratara Tatakam are the temple tanks associated with the temple and the vimana is called Puskala Vimana. There is a separate for Aranavalli Thayar.
54	Thirukkalvanur	Kanchipuram, Kanchipuram district, Tamil Nadu12.840653°N 79.703250°E		Anjilai Valli and Adi Varaha Perumal	The shrine is present inside the Kamakshi Amman temple, and glorifies Vishnu in his form of Varaha.
55	Thiruppavalavannam	Kanchipuram, Kanchipuram district, Tamil Nadu12.843658°N 79.707604°E		Pavalavalli and Pavalavarna Perumal	Associated with the legend that Vishnu purportedly assumes his form in different hues depending on the conduct of humans during a given age.
56	Thiru Parameswara Vinnagaram	Kanchipuram, Kanchipuram district, Tamil Nadu12.837151°N 79.709482°E		Vaikundavalli and Vaikundanatha Perumal	Regarded to be the site where Vishnu appeared before Pallava princes who had performed a yajna for him.
57	Thiruputkuzhi	Thiruputkuzhi, Kanchipuram district, Tamil Nadu12.872642°N 79.618683°E		Maragadhavalli and Vijayaraghava Perumal	The last rites of Jatayu are believed to have been performed here by Rama.
58	Thirunindravur	Thirunindravur, Chennai, Tiruvallur District, Tamil Nadu13.112501°N 80.026096°E		Sudhavalli and Bhaktavatsala Perumal	Regarded to be the site where Varuna worshipped Vishnu.
59	Thiruvallur	Thiruvallur, Chennai, Tiruvallur district, Tamil Nadu13.143204°N 79.907439°E		Kanakavalli and Vaidya Veeraraghava Perumal	Regarded to be the site where Vishnu tested the devotion of a sage by asking him large portions of his food and residence before blessing him.
60	Thiruvallikeni	Chennai, Chennai district, Tamil Nadu13.053920°N 80.276942°E		Rukmini and Venkatakrishna Perumal	The name Parthasarathy, in Tamil, means the 'charioteer of Arjuna', referring to Krishna's role as a charioteer to Arjuna in the epic Mahabharata. It was originally built by the Pallavas in the 8th century and considered the oldest structural in Chennai.
61	Thiruneermalai, Tambaram	Chengalpattu, Chengalpattu district, Tamil Nadu12.963808°N 80.114953°E		Animamalar Mangai and Neervanna Perumal	Brahmanda Purana refers this place Toyatri, meaning a mountain surrounded by water. Thiruneermalai, the modern Tamil name also means a sacred mountain surrounded by water. Among the eight sacred Vishnu temples where he manifested himself called "Ashtaswayamvakta Kshetra".
62	Thiruvidanthai	Thiruvidanthai, Chennai, Chengalpattu district, Tamil Nadu12.763217°N 80.242538°E		Komalavalli and Nityakalyana Perumal	The sage Kalava had 360 daughters who wished to wed Varaha, and the site derives its name from the belief that Varaha marries a maiden here everyday.
63	Thirukkadanmallai	Mahabalipuram, Chengalpattu district, Tamil Nadu12.617464°N 80.193303°E		Boosthalamangadevi and Sthalasayana Perumal	The temple is believed to be the birthplace of the Vaishnava Alvar saint Bhoothathalvar. Sthalasayana Perumal is believed to have appeared to sage Pundarika. The temple is one of the 32 Group of Monuments at Mahabalipuram that are declared as UN world heritage sites, but unlike others that are maintained by the Archaeological Survey of India, the temple is maintained and administered by the Hindu Religious and Endowment Board of the Government of Tamil Nadu.
64	Thirukkadigai	Sholinghur, Vellore district, Tamil Nadu13.093698°N 79.424626°E		Amritavalli and Yoga Narasimha Perumal	The temple has twin hills, with the one of Yoga Narasimha called the Periya malai (big hill) 750 ft (230 m) tall and occupying an area of 1.25 acres (5,100 m^{2}). The top of the hill is approached through a flight of 1,305 steps. The temple is seen as one of the famous temples of Narasimha and a powerful image of Hanuman. Manavala Mamunigal is believed to have performed enunciation of Thirupavai at this place on the request of his disciple Erumbiappa. The town originally was under the control of Shaivites which is substantiated by the temple ruins near Parappan Kulam, in the valley between two hills. This is where original Sholinghur was situated. Unfinished Nandhis and Sthupas are found in numerous places in Sholinghur.
65	Thirunavai	Tirunavaya, Mallapuram district, Kerala; 10.360704°N 76.83654°E		Malarmangai and Navamukunda Perumal	Regarded to be the site where Lakshmi and Gajendra offered worship to Vishnu.
66	Thiruvithuvakodu	Thiruvithuvakoodu, Palakkad district, Kerala; 10.36070°N 76.83654°E		Vithuvakoduvalli and Abhayapradhaya Perumal	The temple is regarded to have been built by Parashurama for the veneration of Shiva.
67	Thrikkakara Vamanamoorthy Kshethram (Thirukatkarai)	Thrikkakara, Ernakulam district, Kerala; 10.36070°N 76.83654°E		Vathsalyavalli and Katkaraswami Perumal	Associated with the Vamana avatar and the humbling of Mahabali.
68	Thirumoozhikkalam	Thirumoozhikulam, Ernakulam district, Kerala; 10.36070°N 76.8365°E		Madhuraveni and Sookthinatha Perumal	Rama's brothers Lakshmana and Bharata are believed to have prayed to Vishnu in this temple.
69	Sree Vallabha Temple (Thiruvallavazh)	Thiruvalla, Pathanamthitta district, Kerala; 9.42723°N 76.81732°E		Vathsalyavalli and Vallabhaswami Perumal	Lakshmi, the daughter of the sea, is regarded to have prayed to Vishnu for the boon of marrying him in this site.
70	Thrikodithanam Mahavishnu Temple (Thirukkodithanam)	Thrikkodithanam, Changanassery, Kottayam District, Kerala; 9.42723°N 76.81732°E		Karpagavalli and Amruthanarayana Perumal	Believed to be the temple constructed by the Pandava Sahadeva during a pilgrimage, after the coronation of Parikshit.
71	Thrichittatt Mahavishnu Temple (Thiruchengundrur)	Chengannur, Alappuzha District, Kerala; 9.42723°N 76.81732°E		Rakthapankajavalli and Devathideva Perumal	It is one of the five ancient shrines in the Chengannur area of Kerala, connected with the legend of Mahabharata, where the five Pandavas are believed to have built one temple each; the temple is believed to have been built by Yudhishthira. The Imayavar (devas) came to this place prior to Yudhishthira, and hence the deity here is referred as Imayavarappar. There is another version that the Pandavas worshipped the idols during their reign, and started installing them in different places during the end of their reign.
72	Thiruppuliyur	Thripuliyur, Alappuzha District, Kerala; 9.42723°N 76.81732°E		Porkodi Nachiyar and Maayapiran Perumal	Believed to be the temple constructed by the Pandava prince Bhima during a pilgrimage, after the coronation of his grand-nephew Parikshit.
73	Aranmula Parthasarathy Temple (Thiruvaranvilai)	Aranmula, Pathanamthitta District, Kerala; 9.35542°N 76.76033°E		Padmasani Nachiyar and Kuralappan Perumal	Believed to be the temple constructed by the Pandava prince Arjuna during a pilgrimage, after the coronation of his grandson Parikshit.
74	Thiruvanvandoor	Thiruvanvandoor, Alappuzha District, Kerala; 9.35542°N 76.76031°E		Kamalavalli Nachiyar and Paambanaiyappan Perumal	It is one of the five ancient shrines in the Chengannur area of Kerala, connected with the legend of Mahabharata, where the five Pandavas are believed to have built one temple each; this temple is believed to have been built by Nakula. Earliest references to this temple appear in the verses and hymns composed by the greatest of Alvar saints – Nammalvar, in circa 800 CE. Stone inscriptions in the temple date it back to the Second Chera Empire (800–1102 CE).
75	Thiruvananthapuram	Thiruvananthapuram, Thiruvananthapuram District, Kerala; 8.53402°N 76.92787°E		Harilakshmi and Ananthapadmanabhaswami Perumal	It is widely regarded to be the richest shrine in India and is the dynastic deity of Travancore. Here, Vishnu's large idol can be viewed from three doors.
76	Thiruvattaru	Thiruvattar, Kanyakumari district, Tamil Nadu; 8.36897°N 77.241670°E		Maragadhavalli and Adhikesava Perumal	The site is associated with the legend of Krishna killing the demon Keshi.
77	Thiruvanparisaram	Thiruppathisaram, Kanyakumari district, Tamil Nadu8.254153°N 77.47032°E		Kamalavalli and Thiruvaḻmarbhan Perumal	Kulashekara Alvar is believed to have constructed the temple after bathing in a nearby water tank.
78	Thirukkurungudi	Thirukkurungudi, Tirunelveli district, Tamil Nadu8.436906°N 77.5259°E		Vamanakshetravalli and Vamanakshetrapoornaya Perumal	Vishnu is regarded to have assumed his Varaha avatar and stayed here with his consort, Bhumi, both assuming a small stature.
79	Thirucheeravaramangai	Nanguneri, Tirunelveli district, Tamil Nadu8.436905°N 77.5259°E		Chireevaramangaivalli and Thothadhrinatha Perumal	Lakshmi is believed to have been born here in one of her earthly incarnations.
80	Thiruvaigundam	Srivaikuntam, Thoothukudi district, Tamil Nadu8.609726°N 77.9760°E		Boonayagi, Vaigundavalli and Vaikuntanatha Perumal	Vishnu assumed his Matsya avatar to retrieve the Vedas from a demon and return them to Brahma, after which he resided here for a while.
81	Thiruvaragunamangai	Natham, Thoothukudi district, Tamil Nadu8.60972°N 77.976037°E		Varagunavalli and Vijayasana Perumal	A sage named Vedavitha performed penance after the death of his parents. Vishnu appeared in the form of a Brahmin, and advised him to perform a penance at Varagunamangai. After several years of penance and pleased by the devotion of Vedavitha, Vishnu appeared before him. Vedavitha requested Vishnu to appear as Vijayasnar at this place.
82	Thiruppuliangudi	Thirupulingudi, Thoothukudi district, Tamil Nadu8.60972°N 77.976037°E		Malarmagal Nachiyar and Poomagal Nachiyar and Kaaichina Vendhan Perumal	Regarded to be the site where Vishnu appeased the jealous Bhudevi, the second aspect of Lakshmi, appearing with Sridevi.
83	Thirutholaivillimangalam (Navathirupathi)	Tholavillimangalam, Thoothukudi district, Tamil Nadu8.60972°N 77.97603°E		Karunthadanganni Nachiyar and Aravindalochana Perumal	Regarded to be the site Vishnu blessed the sage Suprabha.
84	Thirukkulandai (Navathirupathi)	Perungulam, Thoothukudi district, Tamil Nadu8.606968°N 77.950545°E		Alamelumangai Thayar and Kulandhai Valli and Srinivasa Perumal	An asura once abducted Kumudhavalli, the wife of a Vaishnava. The asura was vanquished by Vishnu, who danced on his head, and restored Kumudhavalli to her husband.
85	Thirukkolur (Navathirupathi)	Thirukolur, Thoothukudi district, Tamil Nadu8.6065018°N 77.97389°E		Amudhavalli and Koloorvalli and Vaithamanithi Perumal	Regarded to be the site Vishnu relieved Kubera of his financial misfortune.
86	Thirupperai	Thenthiruperai, Thoothukudi district, Tamil Nadu8.60650°N 77.97389°E		Kuḻaikkadhu Valli, and Thirupperai Nachiyar and Magara Nedungkuḻai Kathar Perumal	Believed to be the site where Bhudevi's beauty was restored after being cursed by Durvasa.
87	Thirukkurugur	Alwarthirunagari, Thoothukudi district, Tamil Nadu8.60696°N 77.95054°E		Aadhinadha Valli and Gurukoor valli and Aadhinatha Perumal	Associated with Nammalvar and Madhurakavi Alvar.
88	Srivillipputhur	Srivilliputhur, Virudhunagar district, Tamil Nadu8.60696°N 77.95054°E		Kodhadevi and Vatapatrasayee Perumal	Regarded to be the site where the deity Ranganatha of Srirangam married his ardent devotee and Alvar, Andal.
89	Thiruthangal	Thiruthankal; Virudhunagar district, Tamil Nadu9.010702°N 77.8853°E		Sengamala Thayar and Narayana Perumal	The temple in its present form was believed to have been built by Devendra Vallabha, a Pandya king. The temple has three inscriptions in its two rock-cut caves, two dating from the period of the 8th century. Ninra Narayana is believed to have appeared to Sridevi and Bhudevi. Ranganatha from the Srirangam Ranganathaswamy temple is believed to have been enamoured by the devotion of Andal. He started a journey to Srivilliputhur Divya Desam to seek her hand for marriage. While reaching the place, it became dark, and he decided to spend the night in the place. Since he stayed at this place, it came to be known as Thiruthangal and the hillock came to be known as Thalagiri.
90	Thirukkoodal	Madurai, Madurai district, Tamil Nadu9.98860°N 78.26434°E		Madhuravalli Thayar and Koodal Aḻagar Perumal	Historians are of the opinion that Koodal Aḻagar temple finds mention in Sangam literature (3 century BCE – 3 century CE) in works like Madurai Kanchi by Mangudi Marudan, Paripāṭal, Kaliththokai and Silappatikaram. Periyalvar obtained the name as he is believed to be an ardent worshipper of Vishnu. While coming out of Madurai, he was taken out in procession to Srivilliputhur and he got the divine vision of Vishnu at the instance. He started reciting his composition, Periya Tirumoḻi, which was compiled in the Naalayira Divya Prabhandam by Manavala Mamunigal. Manavala decreed that the verses of Periyalvar starting with Tirupallandu should be the first and last verse while reciting Pradandam in any sacred occasion in Vishnu temples. Ramanuja, a proponent during the 10th century, believes that Tirupallandu originated at Madurai. Thus Koodal Aḻagar temple finds an indomitable position in Vaishnavite belief. During Mahapralaya, the great disaster, the devotees sought the abode of Vishnu in Madurai.
91	Thirumaliruncholai	Alagar Koyil, Madurai district, Tamil Nadu9.988609°N 78.2643428°E		Sundaravalli and Kallaḻagar Perumal	Kallaḻagar was worshipped by Yama, the Hindu god of death. He requested Vishnu to stay in the place and built a temple with the help of Vishvakarma, the divine architect. Kallaḻagar is believed to have appeared to redeem sage Suthapava off his curse from sage Durvasa. The temple houses some rare Vijayanagara sculptures.
92	Thirumogur	Thirumohur, Madurai district, Tamil Nadu9.98860°N 78.26434°E		Mohavalli and Kalamega Perumal	According to Hindu legend, the presiding deity is believed to have appeared as a female Mohini to lure the asuras to support the devas, the celestial deities. The temple is also known as Mohanapuram and Mohanakshetram.
93	Thirukkoshtiyur	Thirukoshtiyur, Sivaganga district, Tamil Nadu9.98860°N 78.2643°E		Mahalakshmi and Uraga Mellanayaan Perumal	The temple is known as the place where Ramanuja, the expounder of Vaishnavadatta philosophy preached the mantra "Om Namo Narayana" to all people irrespective of their birth. Sowmyanarayana Perumal is believed to have appeared as Narasimha avatar to the devas, the celestial deities.
94	Thiruppullani	Thirupullani, Ramanathapuram district, Tamil Nadu9.98860°N 78.26434°E		Kalyanavalli, Padmasani and Kalyana Jagannatha Perumal	The temple is believed to have been built during the late 8th century CE, with later contributions from Medieval Cholas, later Pandyas, Sethupathi Kings of Ramnad. According to Hindu legend, Rama is believed to have done penance to worship Varuna to seek a path to Lanka upon the grass, giving the name Dharbasayanam to the place.
95	Thirumeyyam	Thirumayam, Pudukottai district, Tamil Nadu9.98860°N 78.2643°E		Uyya Vandha Nachiyar and Sathyagirinatha Perumal	Historians believe that the temple was built during the 9th century by the Pandyas. M.A. Dhaky places the period to be the 7th decade of 9th century. He has also compared the images of the temple to that of Vijayalaya Choleeswaram in Narthamalai, built by Muttaraiyar kings during the same period. Another view is that the temple to have been built by a vassal of Pallavas following the rock-cut architecture of the group of monuments at Mahabalipuram built by Mahendravarman I (590-630 CE) and his son Narasimhavarman I.
96	Thiruvayodhi (Ayodhya)	Ramaswamy Temple (Ammaji Mandir), Ayodhya, Uttar Pradesh 26.805113°N 82.199577°E		Seethadevi and Ramachandra Perumal	Thiruvayodhi is the birthplace and ruling city of Rama. The temple deemed Divya Desam shrine of Thiruvayodhi is the Ammaji Mandir of Ayodhya.
97	Naimisaranyam	Misrikh Neemsar, Uttar Pradesh27.43625°N 80.57052°E		Harilakshmi and Devaraja Perumal	Regarded to be the site where Vishnu offered counsel to the heaven king Indra regarding defeating the demon Vritra. This is believed to be the place where the first Satyanarana Vrata (holy vow of Satyanarayana) was performed
98	Thirupruthi (Jyothirmath)	Jyotirmath, Chamoli district, Uttarakhand; 29.92981°N 79.42245°E	Shri Narsimmha Mandir	Parimalavalli and Paramapurusha Perumal	A pilgrimage site of the Alvars, who venerated Vishnu as Narasimha.
99	Thirukkandamenum Kadinagar	Devaprayag, Tehri Garhwal district, Uttarakhand; 30.145556°N 78.564444°E		Pundareegavalli and Purushottama Perumal	Believed to be the site Rama performed a penance after slaying Ravana, the son of a sage.
100	Thiruvadari (Badrinath)	Badrinath, Chamoli district, Uttarakhand; 30.744695°N 79.491175°E		Aravindhavalli and Badrinarayana Perumal	Lakshmi is believed to have protected and massaged Vishnu's feet at this site. One of the most famous Vaishnavite pilgrimage sites in India, this temple is a part of the Char Dham and Chota Char Dham circuits.
101	Thiru Saligram (Muktinath)	Muktinath Valley; Mustang District; Nepal; 28.816711°N 83.871280°E		Sridevi and Srimurti Perumal	Praised by Thirumangai Alvar as a sacred site of Vishnu, possibly owing to its proximity to Shaligram stones.
102	Thiruvadamadurai (Mathura)	Mathura, Mathura district, Uttar Pradesh; 27.504756°N 77.669646°E		Satyabama and Govardhanagiridhari Perumal	Believed to be the site where Krishna was born. One of the most famous Vaishnavite pilgrimage sites in India.
103	Thiruvaipadi (Gokula)	Gokul, Mathura district, Uttar Pradesh; 26.95009°N 80.43869°E		Rukmini, Sathyabama, and Navamohanakrishna Perumal	Regarded to be the site Krishna spent his childhood with his brother Balarama and Radha, Krishna's lover
104	Thirudwarakai (Dwarka)	Dwarka, Devbhoomi Dwarka district, Gujarat; 24.00995°N 73.33053°E		Rukmini and Dwarakadheesha Perumal	Regarded to be the site Krishna's chief wife, Rukmini, was cursed by the sage Durvasa, and was liberated by her husband. Also located near the site of Dwaraka, the ancient floating island kingdom of Lord Krishna.
105	Singavel Kundram (Ahobilam)	Ahobilam, Kurnool district, Andhra Pradesh; 15.34099°N 79.15329°E		Lakshmi and Prahlada Varada Narasimha swamy	This is believed to be the site where Narasimha appeared to protect his devotee Prahlada and slay the demon Hiranyakashipu. The giant massive pillar from which he appeared is called Ugra Stambha, and one can still see it. Here, Narasimha appears in nine different forms; these re collectively called Nava Narasimha. There is a pond filled with red water called Rakta Kundam, where it is believed Narasimha washed his bloodied hands.
106	Thiruvenkadam	Tirupati, Chittoor district, Andhra Pradesh; 13.83393°N 79.40872°E		Padmavati and Srinivasa Perumal	Vishnu, in his form as Venkateswara or Srinivasa, married Padmavati, the mortal princess avatar of Lakshmi, at this temple. One of the most famous Vaishnavite pilgrimage sites in India, this temple draws about 100,000 visitors everyday and is also one of the richest temples in India in terms of wealth. The idol here is also called Kaliyuga Pratyakshadeva (The one who relieves devotees of troubles in the Kali Yuga). A pilgrimage to Tirupati is not complete without a visit to the Padmavati Temple in Tiruchanur. Venkateswara is also called Govinda, Srinivasa or Balaji.
107	Tirupparkatal (Kshira Sagara)	Heaven		Kadal Magal and Parkadal Natha Perumal	This Divya Desam is not located on Earth. It is located in the higher heavens. It is often described as an ocean of pure milky water, upon which Vishnu and Lakshmi reside, lying on the snake Adishesha. But the divine essence of this ocean is believed to be present in this temple - Prasanna Venkatesa Perumal Temple, Perumal Koil Street, District Vellore, Walaja Taluk, Tirupparkatal, Tamil Nadu, India
108	Tirupparamapadam (Vaikuntha)	Vaikuntha		Paramapada Nayaki and Paramapada Nathan	This Divya Desam is not located on Earth. Vaikuntha is the heavenly abode of Vishnu and Lakshmi. It is often described as being approached by seven tall golden doors. The guardians Jaya-Vijaya, the vehicle Garuda and the military commander Vishwaksena stand at the seventh door. When the seventh door opens, one can see Vishnu and Lakshmi seated on Adishesha, enjoying music from his devotee Narada. While the first 106 Divya Desams are believed to be mortal earthly replicas of Vaikuntha, this is the Vaikuntha situated upon the spiritual sky (Paravyoma).

== See also ==
- Mangalasasanam
- Abhimana Kshethram
- Char Dham
- Nava Tirupati

== Sources ==
- B. S., Chandrababu; S., Ganeshram; C., Bhavani (2011). History of People and Their Environs. Bharathi Puthakalayam. ISBN 9789380325910.
- Chari, S. M. Srinivasa (1997). Philosophy and Theistic Mysticism of the Āl̲vārs. Motilal Banarsidass Publishers. ISBN 9788120813427.
- Dalal, Roshen (2011). Hinduism: An Alphabetical Guide. Penguin Books India. ISBN 9780143414216.
- Das, Sisir Kumar; Sāhitya Akādemī (2005). A history of Indian literature, 500-1399: from courtly to the popular. chennai: Sāhitya Akādemī. ISBN 81-260-2171-3.
- Govindāchārya, Aḷkoṇḍavilli (1902). The Holy Lives of the Azhvârs: Or, the Drâvida Saints. Mysore: G. T. A. Press. "periyazhvar."
- Ramanujan, Attipat Krishnaswami (2005). Hymns for the Drowning: Poems for Vishnu. Penguin Books. ISBN 9780144000104.
- Rao, P.V.L. Narasimha (2008), Kanchipuram - Land of Legends, Saints & Temples, New Delhi: Readworthy Publications (P) Ltd., ISBN 978-93-5018-104-1
