= Azhagiyasingar temple =

Azhagiyasingar temple may refer to several places:

- Azhagiyasingar temple, Thiruvali close to Sirkazhi in Nagapattinam district
- Azhagiyasingar temple, Kanchipuram in Kanchipuram (also called Tiruvelukkai)
