= Navamohana Krishna Temple =

Krishna temple and Divya Desam

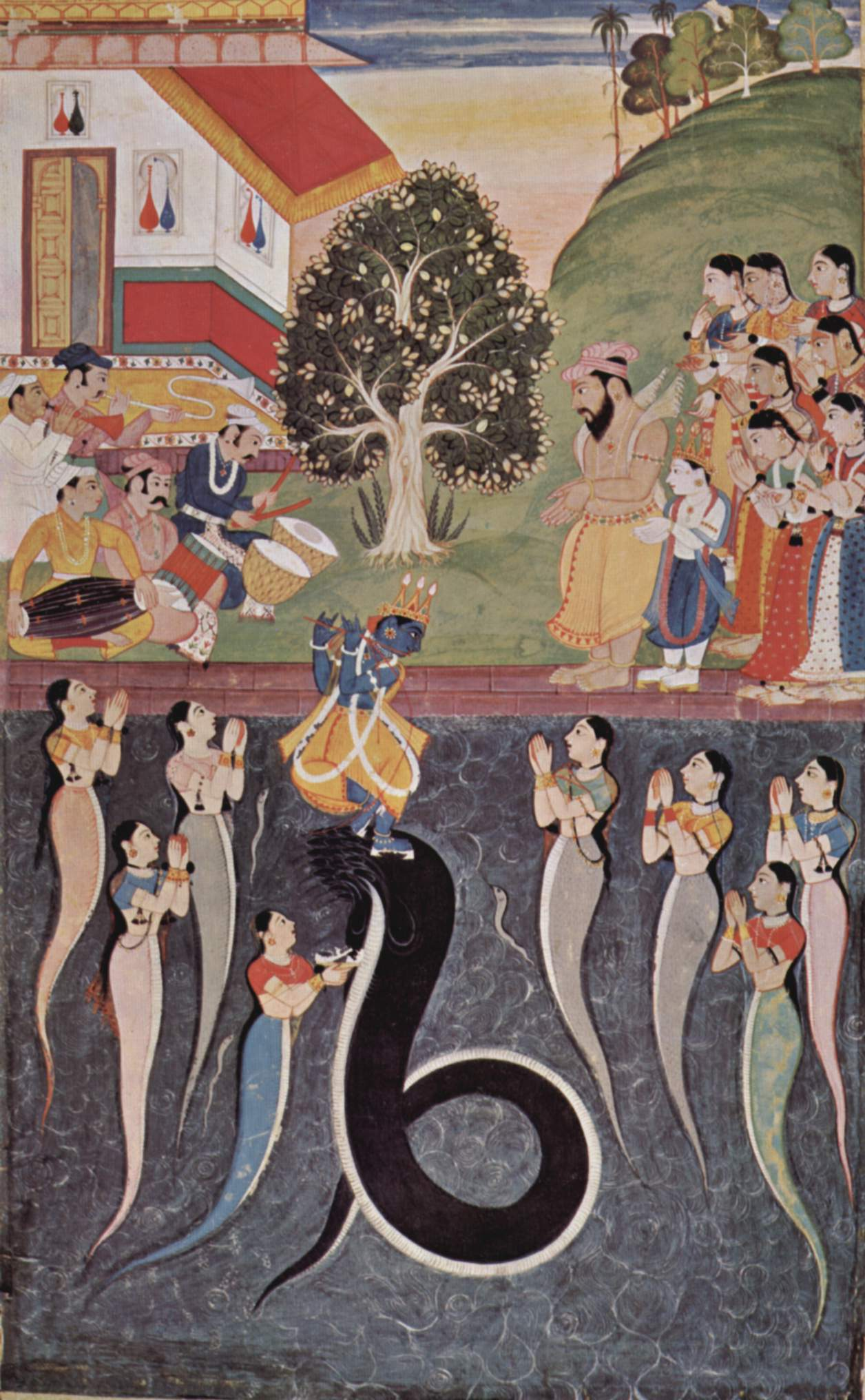
- Krishna dances over Kaliya

- Location in Uttar Pradesh

Religion
- Affiliation: Hinduism
- District: Mathura
- Deity: Krishna; Rukmini; Satyabhama

Location
- Location: Gokul
- State: Uttar Pradesh
- Country: India
- Interactive map of Navamohana Krishna Temple
- Coordinates: 27°27′N 77°43′E

The Navamohana Krishna Temple, also referred to in Sri Vaishnava tradition as Tiruvaipadi, is one of the Divya Desams, the 108 temples of Vishnu revered by the 12 poet-saints called the Alvars. It is located in modern day Gokul, in the Mathura district of the Indian state of Uttar Pradesh. It is located 15 km south-east of Mathura. It is regarded to be the site of Krishna's childhood past-times.

The place is revered by Andal, the only female Alvar. It is also closely associated with the ancient Nappinai cult of Tamil Nadu.

== Legend ==
According to Hindu tradition, Krishna, an avatar of Vishnu, spent his childhood days in Gokulam. He danced over the subdued Kaliya on the banks of the river Yamuna. This divine act was witnessed by the people of Gokulam, Krishna's foster-father Nanda, and his brother Balarama. A chapter in Aichar Kuruvai describes the event. The association of Nappinnai, the beloved shepherd girl with Krishna is unique to Tamil tradition, like the huntress Valli with Murugan. According to some scholars, the Radha cult of the later period was close to the ancient Nappinai cult of Tamil Nadu.

== Architecture ==
The Navamohana Krishna temple is located on the banks of river Yamuna, 15 km (9.3 mi) from Mathura. It is located on the other side of Yamuna river from Mathura, and one has to cross the river to reach the temple. The temple is believed to be a modern addition, with the old temple destroyed due to various political scenario. The temple has a small shrine and pillared halls. The sanctum houses the image of Navamohana Krishna temple in his childhood form. The temple tank is located to the west of the temple, parallel to river Yamuna.

== Religious importance ==
The temple is revered in Naalayira Divya Prabandham, the 7th–9th century Vaishnava canon, by Periyalvar in ten, Andal in five, and Thirumangai Alvar in seven hymns. The temple is classified as a Divya Desam, one of the 108 Vishnu temples that are glorified by the Alvars in the compendium.
