= Thirukkalvanur =

- Thirukkalvanur, Kanchipuram, Tamil Nadu

Religion
- Affiliation: Hinduism
- District: Kanchipuram
- Deity: Aadhivaraaha Perumal
- Festivals: Vaikuntha Ekadashi, Navratri

Location
- Location: Kanchipuram, Tamil Nadu
- State: Tamil Nadu
- Country: India
- Interactive map of Thirukkalvanur
- Coordinates: 12.840845°N 79.703205°E

Architecture
- Type: Dravidian architecture

Specifications
- Temple: Two
- Inscriptions: Mangalaasaasanam by Thirumangai Aallhvaar
- Elevation: 108.27 m (355 ft)

Thirukkalvanur also known as 'Aadhivaraaha Perumal Temple' is a Vaishnavite temple in Kanchipuram, Tamil Nadu state in India. It is one of the 108 Divya desams. It is situated right to the Kamakshi Amman shrine in Kanchipuram.

== Location ==
This temple is located with the coordinates of 12.840845°N 79.703205°E in the premises of Kamakshi Amman Temple in Kanchipuram.

== Details ==
The main deity Aadhivaraaha Perumal appears here in standing posture. Goddess is Anjilaivalli Naachiyaar. Temple tank is named Nithyapushkarini. Vimaanam is called Vaamana vimaanam. One Mangalaasaasanam was sung in this temple by Thirumangai Aallhvaar. Here in this temple, goddess Mahalakshmi appears in worshipping posture towards the main deity.

== Festivals ==
Vaikuntha Ekadashi and Navratri are celebrated as important festivals in this temple.
