= Thalai Sanga Nanmathiyam =

Hindu temple in Tamil Nadu

Nanmadiya Perumal Temple
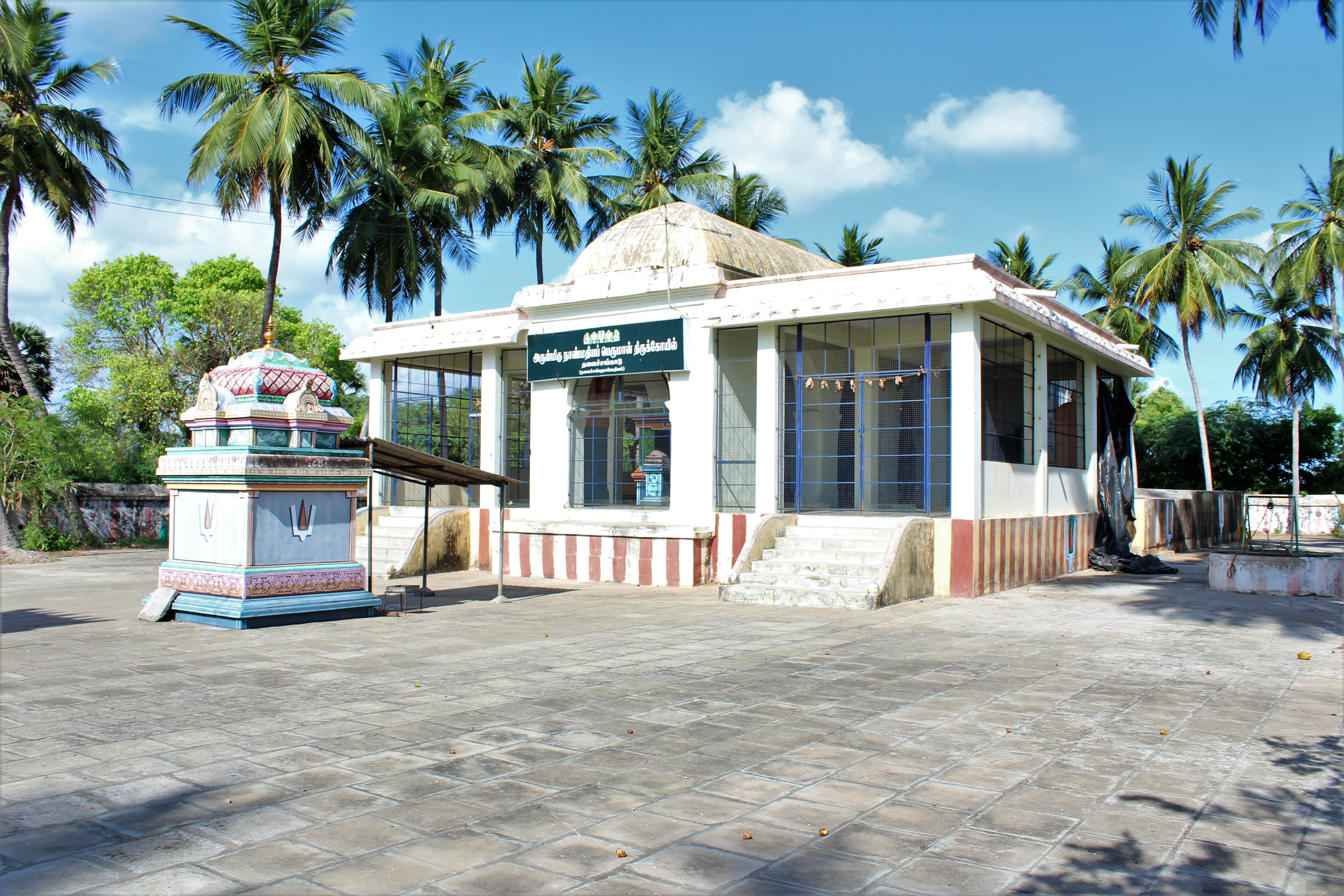

- Location in Tamil Nadu

Religion
- Affiliation: Hinduism
- District: Mayiladuthurai
- Deity: Naanmadiya Perumal (Vishnu); Talaichanga Nachiar (Lakshmi)
- Features: Temple tank: Chandra

Location
- Location: Thalachangadu
- State: Tamil Nadu
- Country: India
- Coordinates: 11°7′47″N 79°47′7″E

Architecture
- Type: Dravidian architecture

The Naanmadiya Perumal Temple (also called Thalachanga Nanmathiyam) is a Hindu temple situated in the village of Thalaichangadu, near Akkur in Mayiladuthurai district in the South Indian state of Tamil Nadu. Constructed in the Dravidian style of architecture, the temple is glorified in the Nalayira Divya Prabandham, the early medieval Tamil canon of the Alvar saints from the 6th–9th centuries CE. It is one of the 108 Divya Desams dedicated to Vishnu, who is worshipped as Nanmadiya Perumal and his consort Lakshmi as Talaichanga Nachiar.

The temple is maintained and administered by the Hindu Religious and Endowment Board of the Government of Tamil Nadu.

== Legend ==
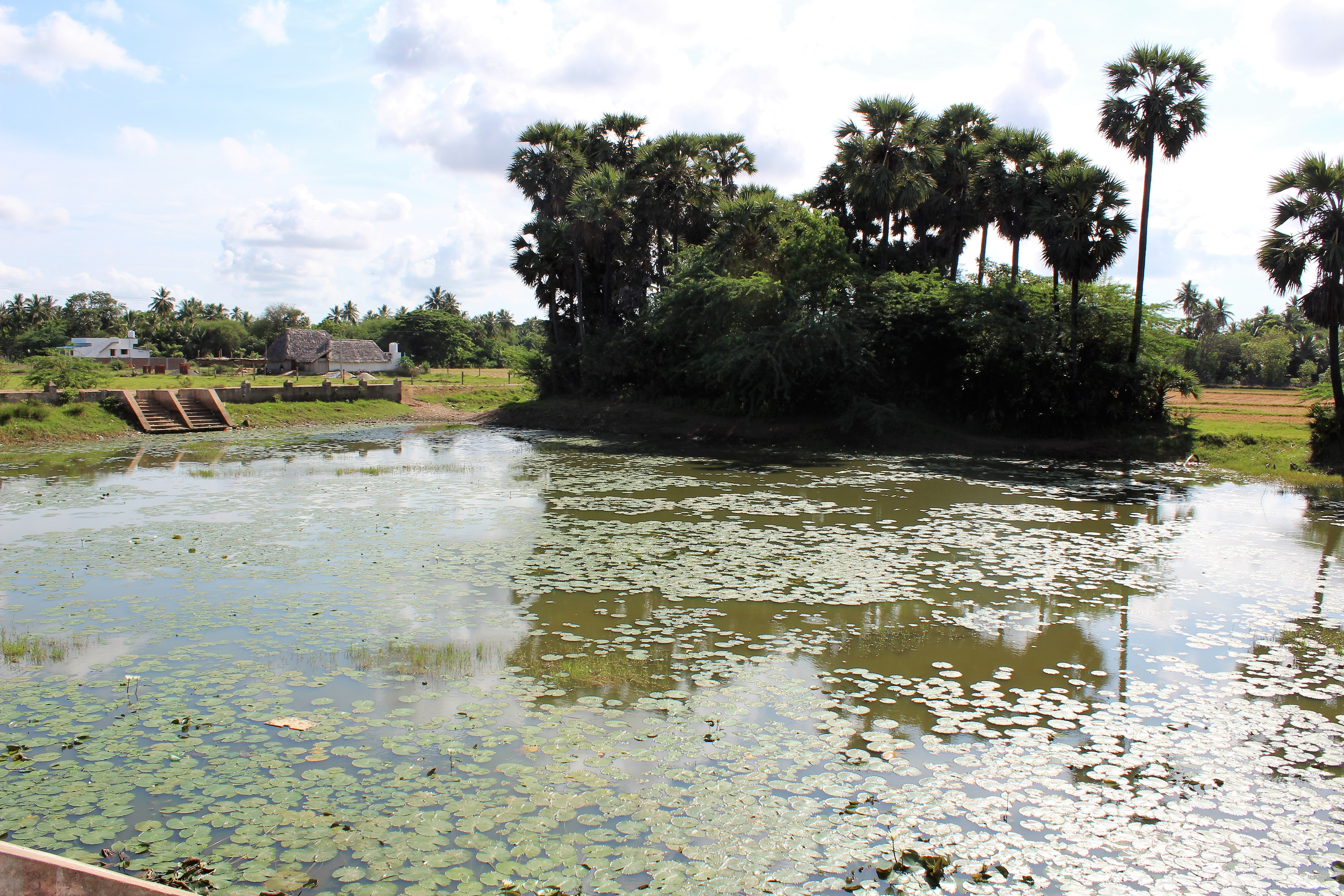
Chandra Pushkarani, the temple tank

It is believed that Vishnu appeared for Chandra, the moon god, who worshipped Vishnu at this place. As per Hindu legend, Chandra, the moon god, is treated second after Surya, the sun god, among the Navagrahas, the nine planetary deities. He is also considered the brother of Lakshmi, the consort of Vishnu, as he emerged during the churning of the Ocean of Milk. Chandra once conducted a sacrifice called rajasuya yajna, which was attended by all the celestial deities. Tara, the wife of Brihaspati (Jupiter) was attracted to Chandra. The moon god took away Tara from Brihaspati, leading to the Tarakamaya War. Brihaspati cursed Chandra to be afflicted by disease. Tara gave birth to Budha (Mercury) for Chandra. According to the temple's regional legend, to free himself of the curse, Chandra started worshipping Vishnu in this place. Since the presiding deity holds the famous conch, this place came to be known as Talaichankam, with cankam meaning conch.

== Architecture and history ==
Nanmathiya Perumal temple is situated in the village of Thalaichangadu, near Akkur in Mayiladuthurai district in the South Indian state of Tamil Nadu. The temple is built in Dravidian style of architecture. It has a single tiered gopuram and a temple tank in front of it and is called Chandra Pushkarani. The temple has one precinct and two shrines. The temple has a shrine for Naanmadiya Perumal facing east. It has a conch that is considered one of its kind. It is located on the southern bank of river Kaveri. The place was very famous during the Chola regime for conch as it was closer to their port town Poompuhar. The place finds mention in the Sangam literature Cilappatikaram. The temple and the place has been patronized by the Chola kings. The temple was in a dilapidated condition and it was renovated by Suntara Ramanuja. Like Shiva, the presiding deity sports a crescent in his head.

== Literary mention ==
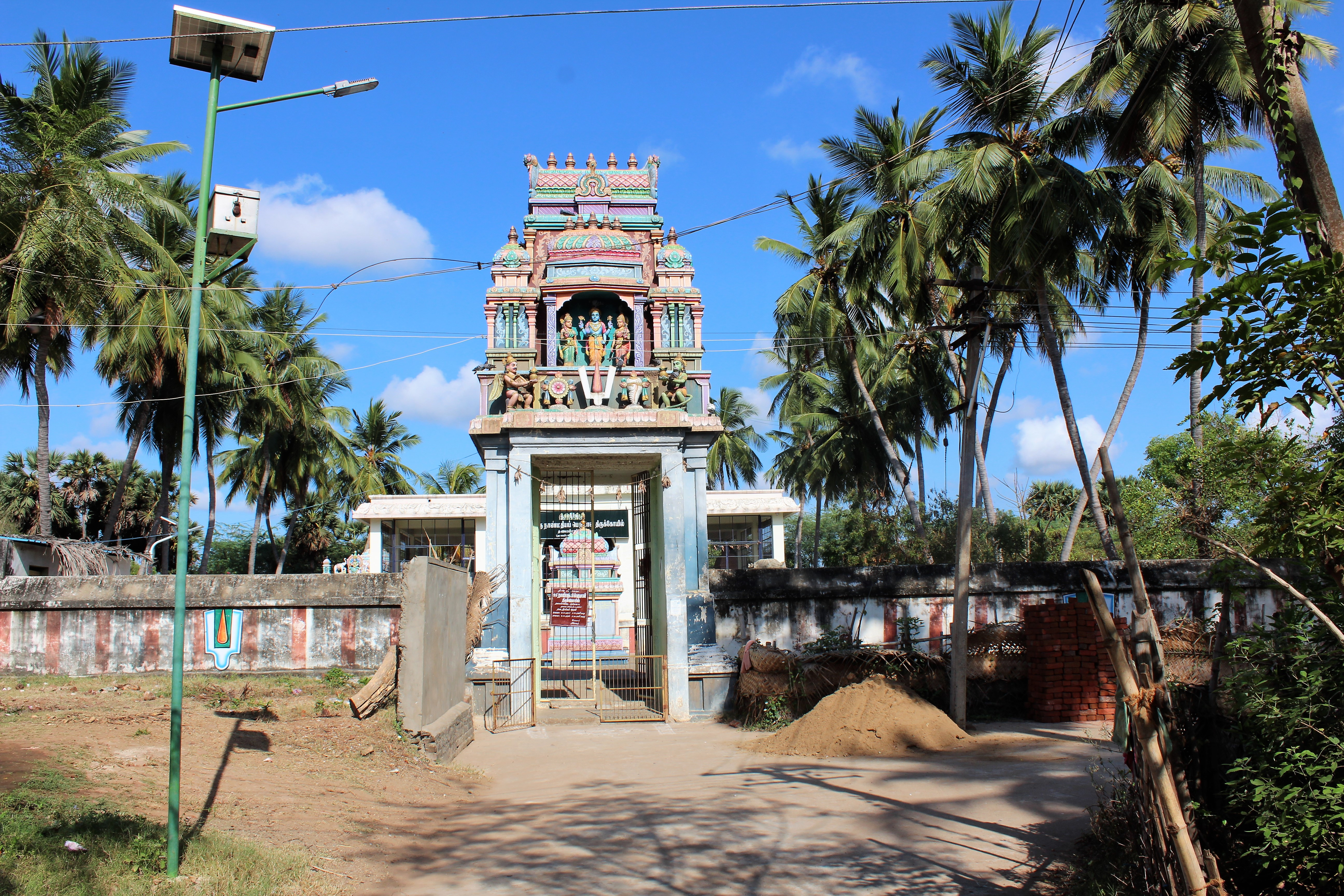
The gateway

The temple is mentioned in the Nalayira Divya Prabandham, the 7th–9th century Sri Vaishnava canon, by Thirumangai Alvar. The temple is classified as a Divya Desam, one of the 108 Vishnu temples mentioned in the book. During the 18th and 19th centuries, the temple was mentioned in several works like the 108 Tirupati Antati by Divya Kavi Pillai Perumal Aiyangar.
