= Kola Valvill Ramar Temple, Tiruvelliyangudi =

Hindu temple in Kumbakonam

Kola Valvill Ramar Temple
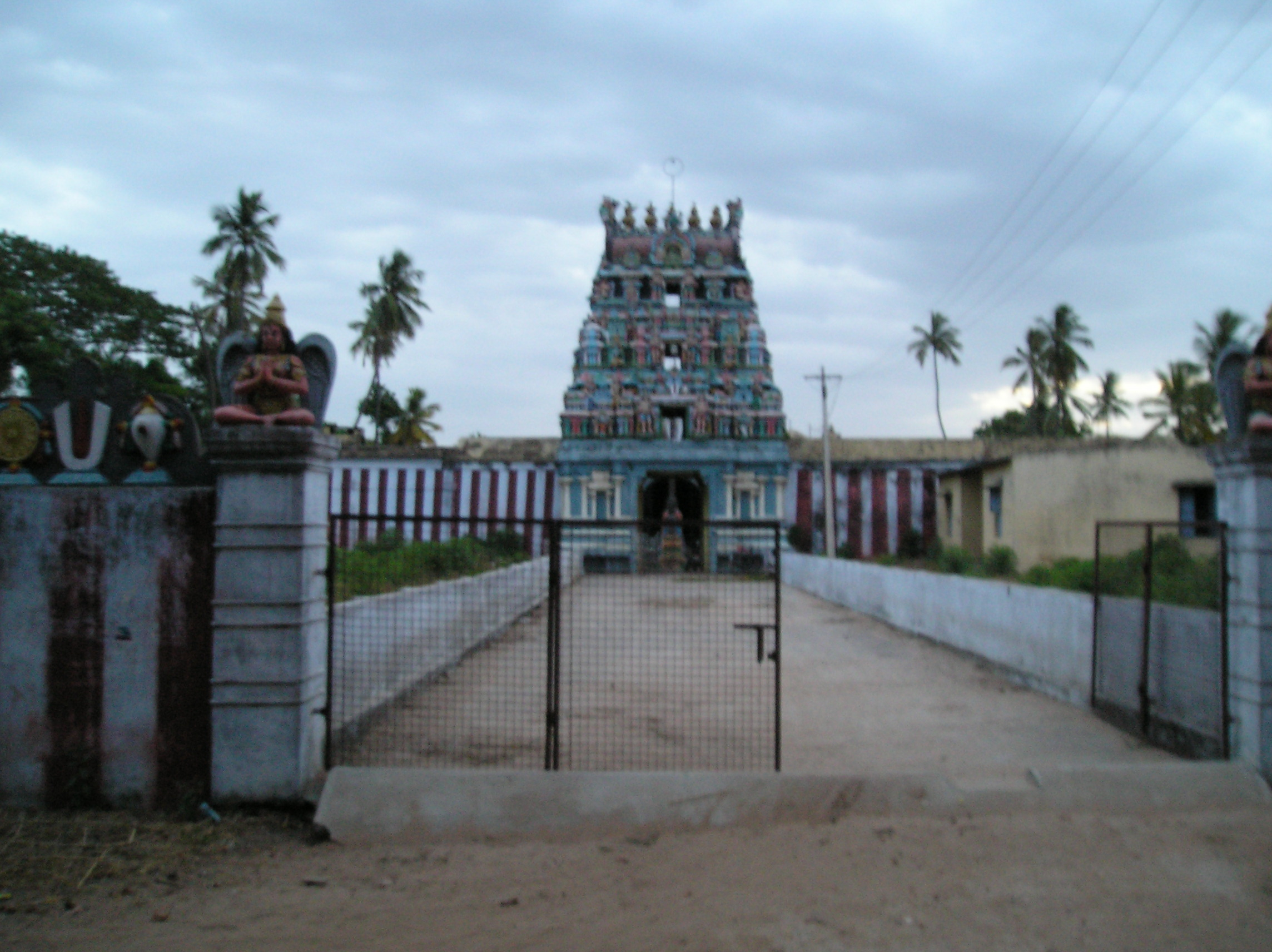
- Temple Gopuram

- Location in Tamil Nadu

Religion
- Affiliation: Hinduism
- District: Thanjavur
- Deity: Kola Valvill Ramar (Vishnu) Maragadha Valli Thaayar (Lakshmi) Sringara Sundaran
- Features: Temple tank: Sukra, Brahma, Indra, Parasara

Location
- Location: Tiruvelliyangudi
- State: Tamil Nadu
- Country: India
- Interactive map of Kola Valvill Ramar Temple
- Coordinates: 11°3′25″N 79°26′36″E

Architecture
- Type: Dravidian architecture

Kolavalvil Ramar Temple is a Hindu temple dedicated to Vishnu 19 km from Kumbakonam, Tamil Nadu, India. Constructed in the Dravidian style of architecture, the temple is mentioned in the Nalayira Divya Prabandham, the early medieval Tamil canon of the Alvar saints from the 6th–9th centuries CE. It is one of the 108 Divya Desams dedicated to Vishnu, who is worshipped as Kola Valvill Ramar and his consort Lakshmi as Maragathavalli.

A granite wall surrounds the temple, enclosing all the shrines and two bodies of water. There is a four-tiered gopuram, the temple's gateway tower.

Kola Vallvil Ramar is believed to have appeared to the sage Markendeya. The temple is maintained and administered by the Hindu Religious and Endowment Board of the Government of Tamil Nadu.

== Legend ==
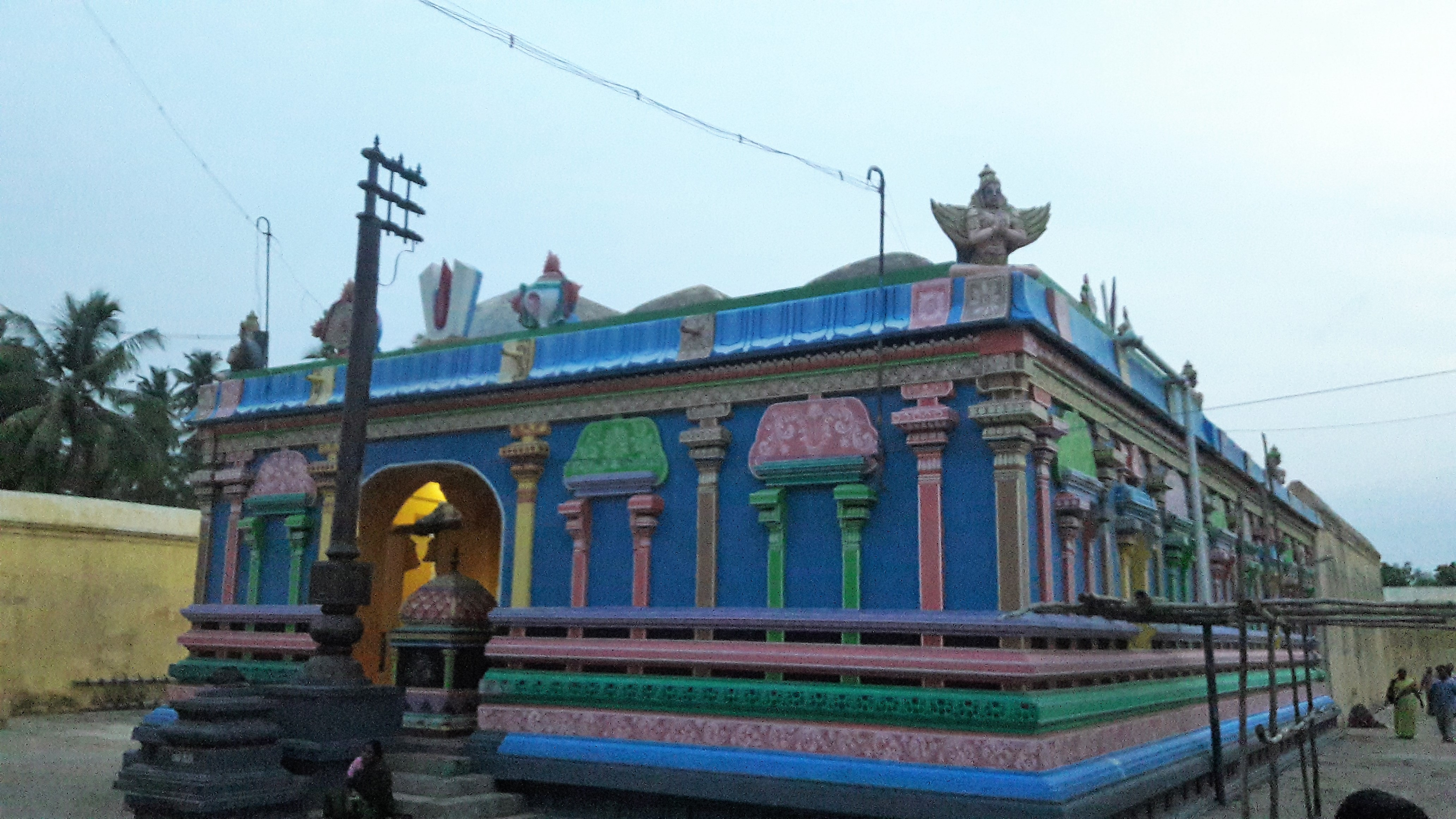
Image of the shrine

As per Hindu legend, the temple was called Brahma Putram in Satya Yuga, Parasaram in Treta Yuga, Sainthiranagaram in Dvapara Yuga and Bhargavapuram in Kali Yuga. The temple is associated with Trivikrama avatar of Vishnu. As per the legend, Sukrachariyar, the demon guru, was against king Mahabali donating land to Vishnu in the form of a Brahmin. He took the form of the insect and shut the tube of the jug used by the king to spill water during the donation. Vishnu identified the trick and injured the eyes of the insect with a small spear. Sukracharyar, who lost his eyes, did penance at this place to attain the lost eye. It is the believed the light he attained is still glowing at the temple as a lamp called Nethra Deepam. Sage Parasara is believed to have worshiped the presiding deity of the temple.

Once, the architects of Devaloka, Vishvakarma and Mayan had an argument on whose skill was superior. Brahma, the god of creation informed Mayan that Vishvakarma attained betterment as he built Vaikuntha, the abode of Vishnu on account of accomplishments in a previous birth. He also informed Mayan that to attain similar status, he has to identify and build an abode near the river Kaveri similar to Vaikuntha. Mayan inspected various places and finally identified Thiruvelliyangudi, where sage Markendeya was doing penance. He built a beautiful temple and its compound, which is believed to be the temple in modern times. Vishnu appeared as Sringara Sundaran (beautiful deity).

== Architecture ==
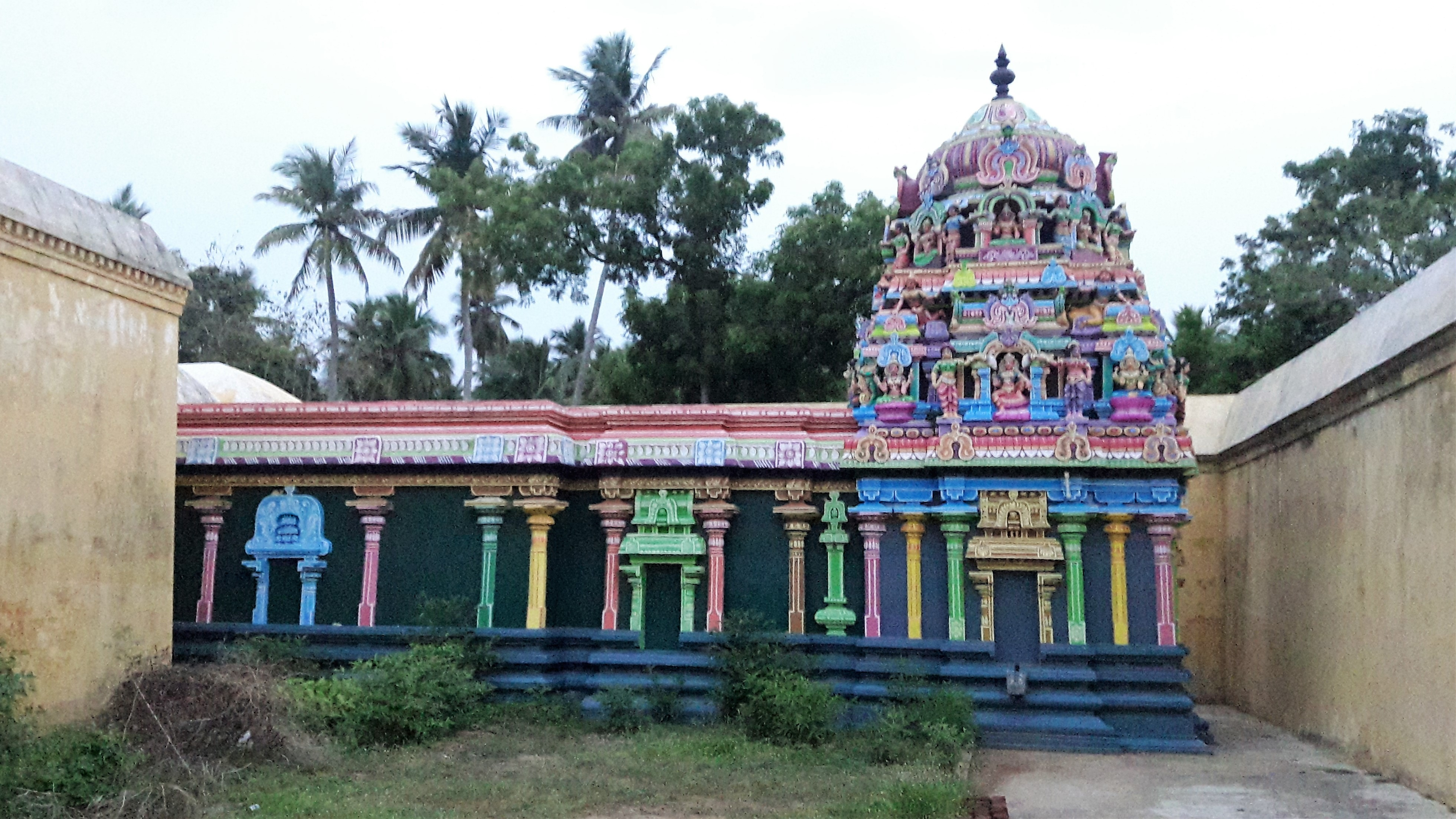
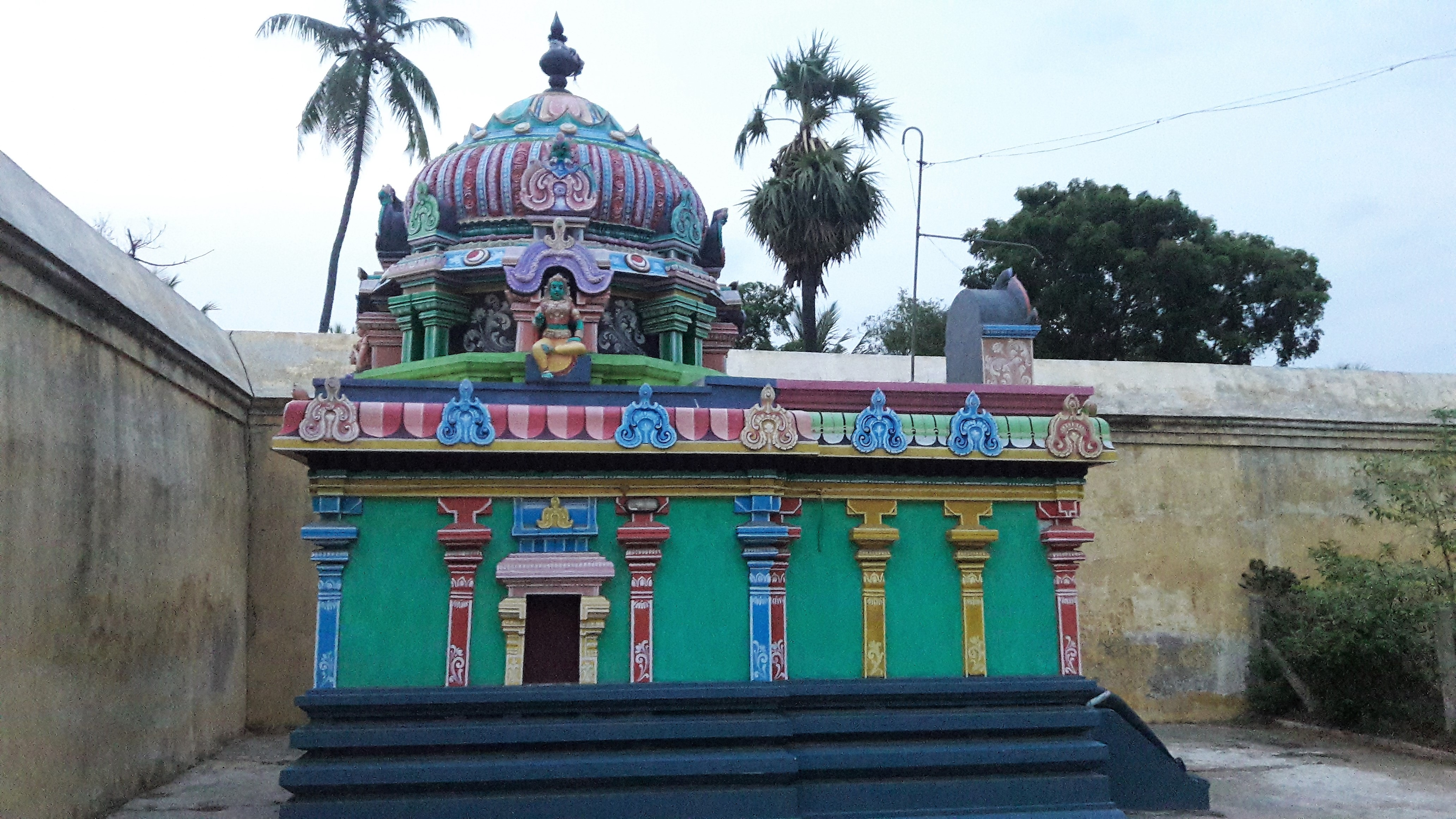
Images of the shrines of the temple

The temple has a three-tiered rajagopuram (gateway tower) and is enclosed within brick walls. Leaving the central shrine of the presiding deity, which is built with granite, all the other shrines are built with brick. There are separate shrines for the consort of Kolavalli Ramar, Maragathavalli. The presiding deity, Kola Valvill Ramar, is reclining.

== See also ==
Divya Desams

== Notes ==
This Temple has a three tiered Rajagopuram Ref: Visittemples.com
