= Thanjai Mamani Koil =

Hindu group of temples

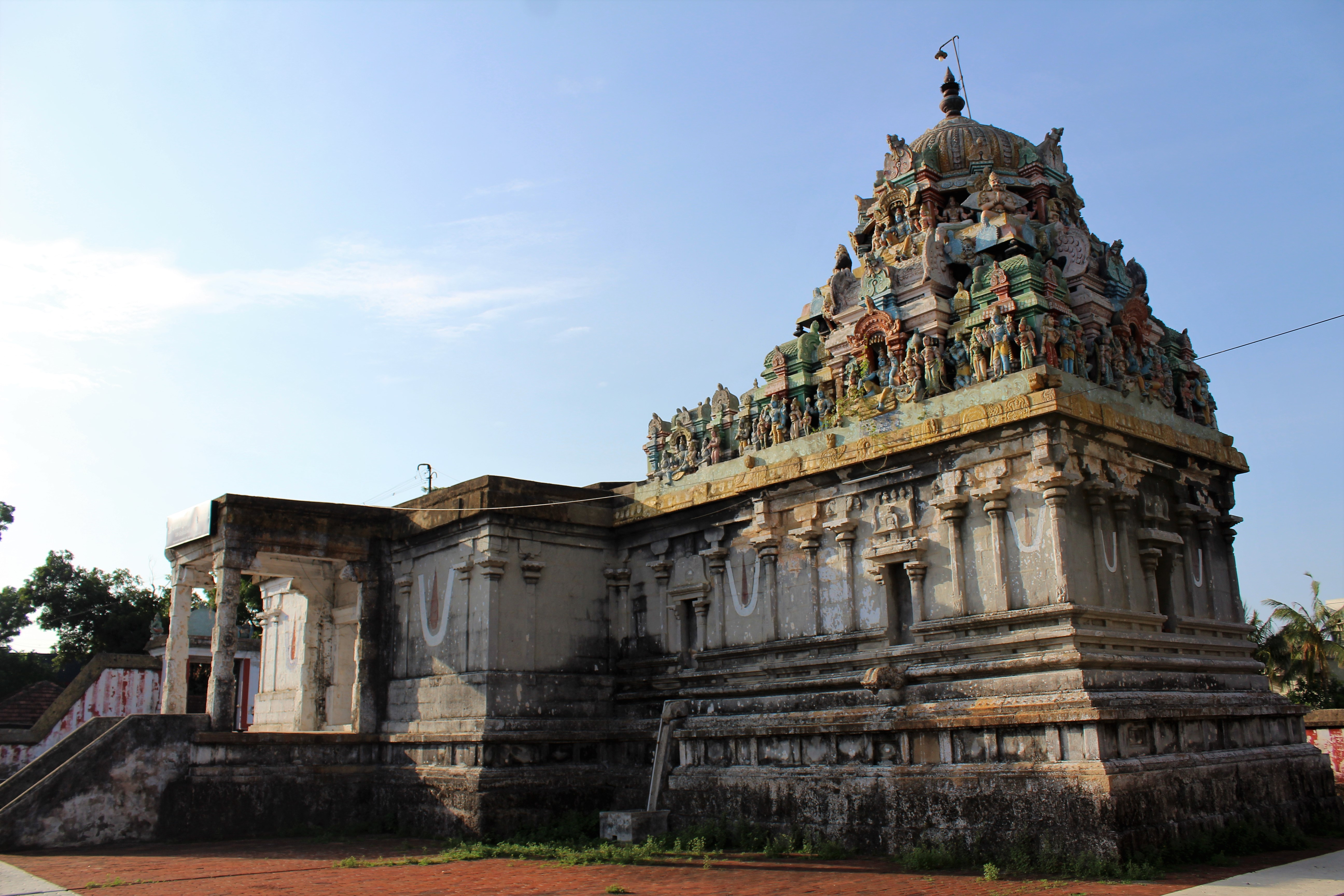
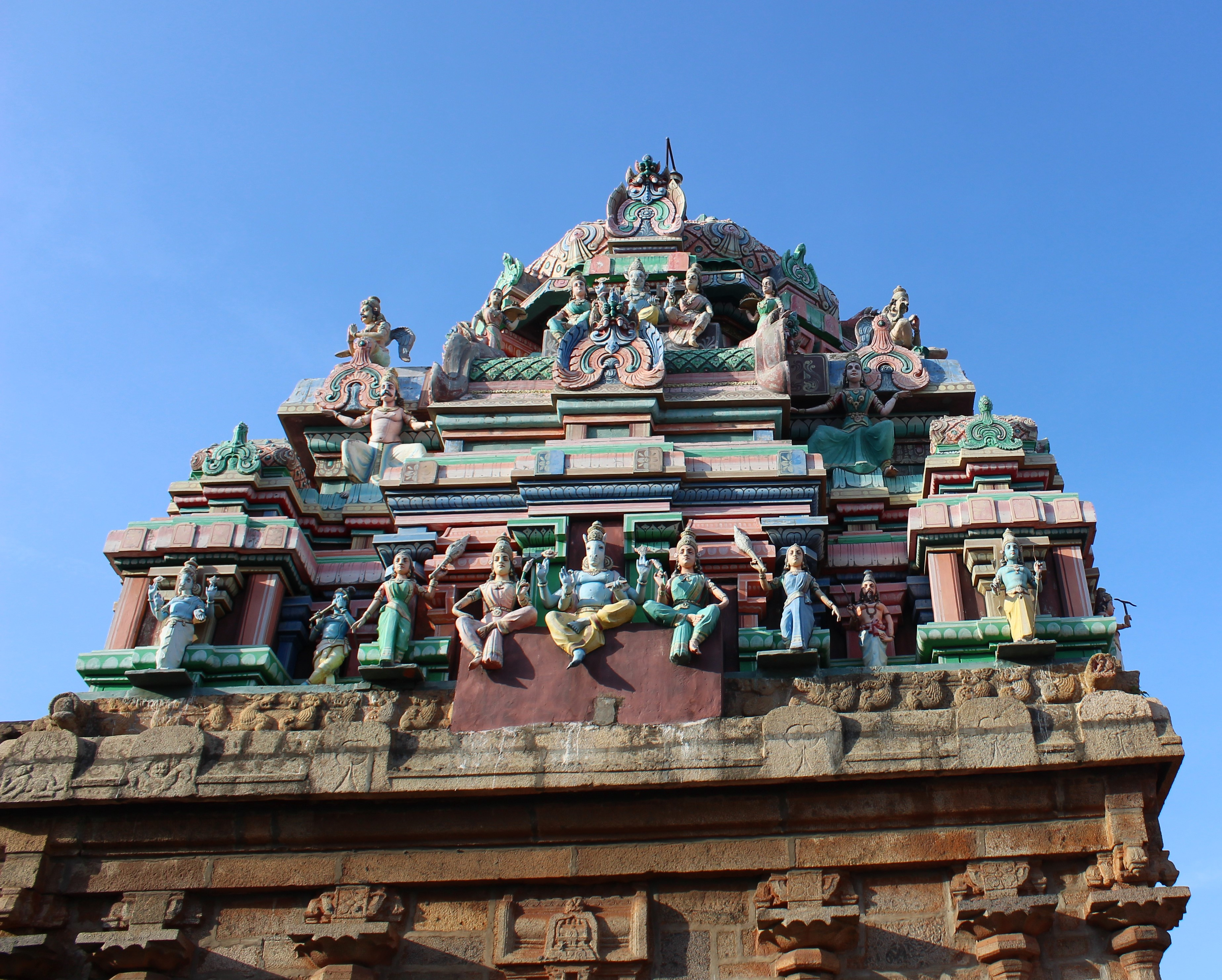
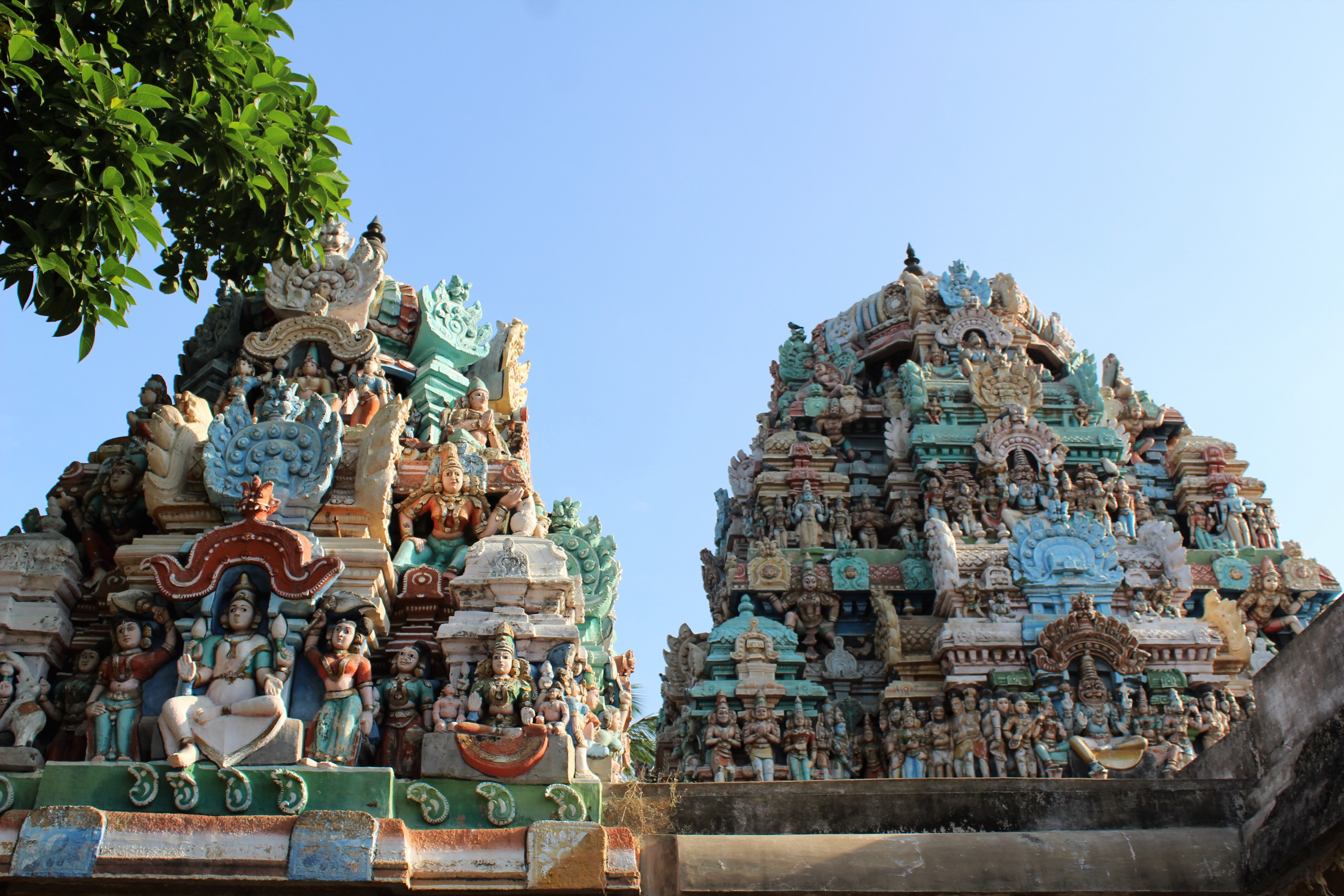

- Location in Tamil Nadu

Religion
- Affiliation: Hinduism
- District: Thanjavur
- Deity: Neelamegha Perumal, Manikunraperumal, Narasimhar; Sengamalavalli, Ambujavalli, Thanjai Nayagi

Location
- State: Tamil Nadu
- Country: India
- Coordinates: 10.8157°N 79.1386°E

Architecture
- Type: Dravidian architecture
- Temple: 3

Thanjai Mamani Koil, Thirutanjai, or Thanjavur Perumal Temple is a set of three adjacent Hindu temples to Vishnu in Thanjavur, Tamil Nadu, India. It is one of the Divya Desams, the 108 temples of Vishnu revered by the 12 poet saints called the Alvars. Unlike other Divya Desams where a single shrine is referenced, this set of temples is referred together in all the pasurams (sacred hymns).

The temples are believed to be of significant antiquity with contributions at different times from Medieval Cholas, the Vijayanagara Empire, and Madurai Nayaks. The temples are enshrined within granite walls and the three complex contains all the shrines of the temple.

Vishnu is regarded by adherents to have assumed the form of Varaha the boar to kill three demons named Tanchakan, Tantakan, and Kacamukan. The temples are maintained and administered by the Hindu Religious and Charitable Endowments Department of the Government of Tamil Nadu along with Thanjavur Palace Devasthanam.

== Legend ==
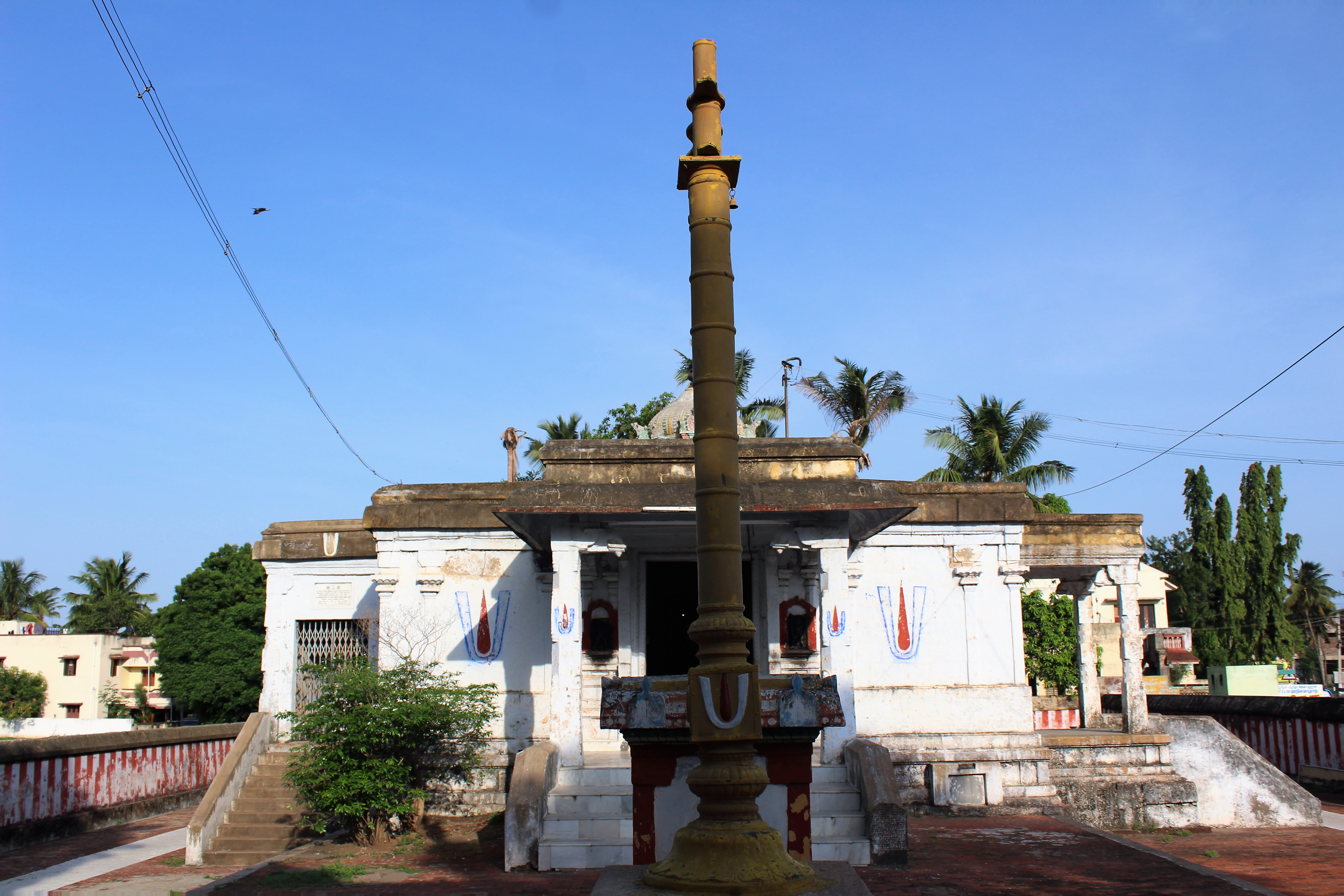
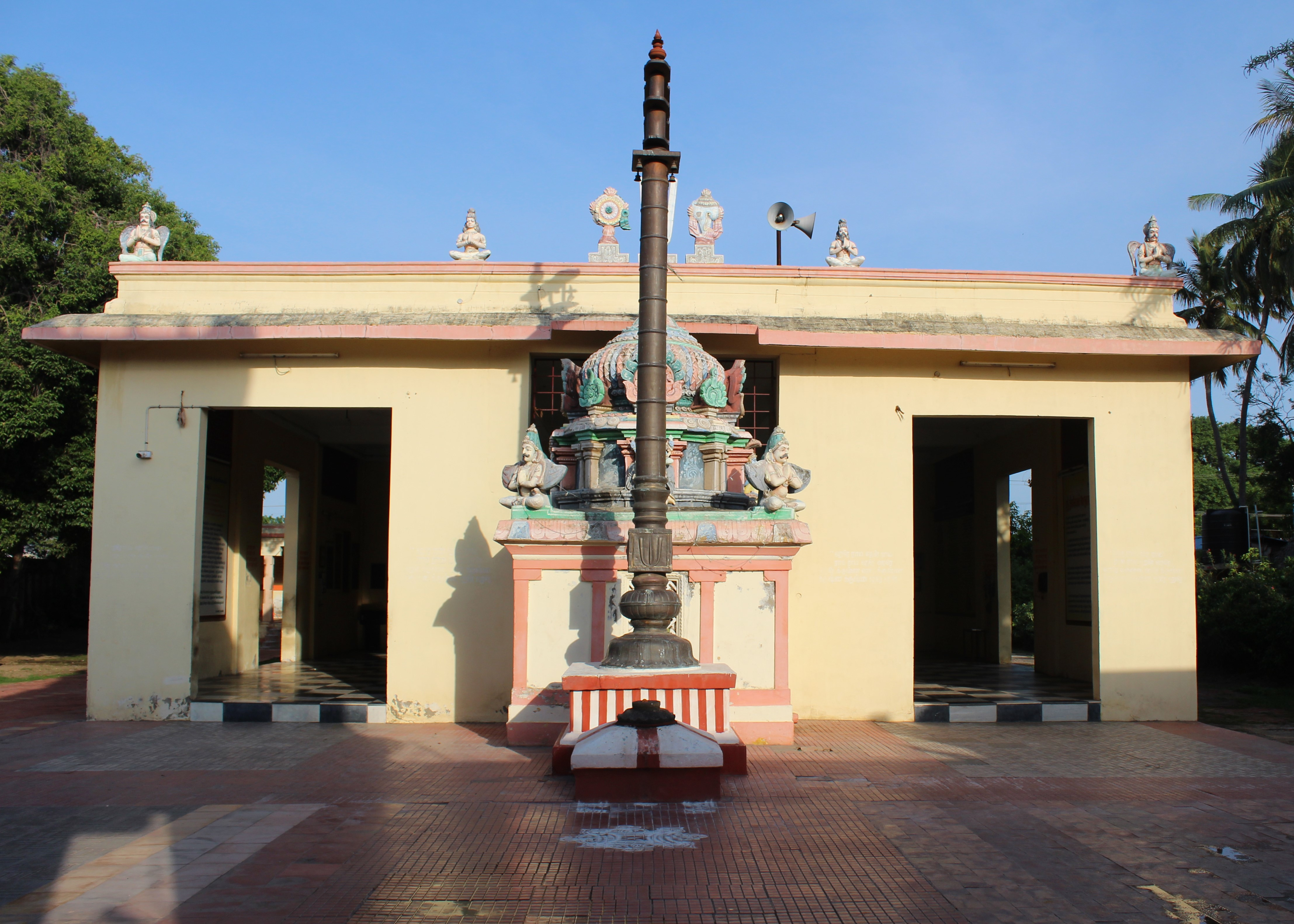
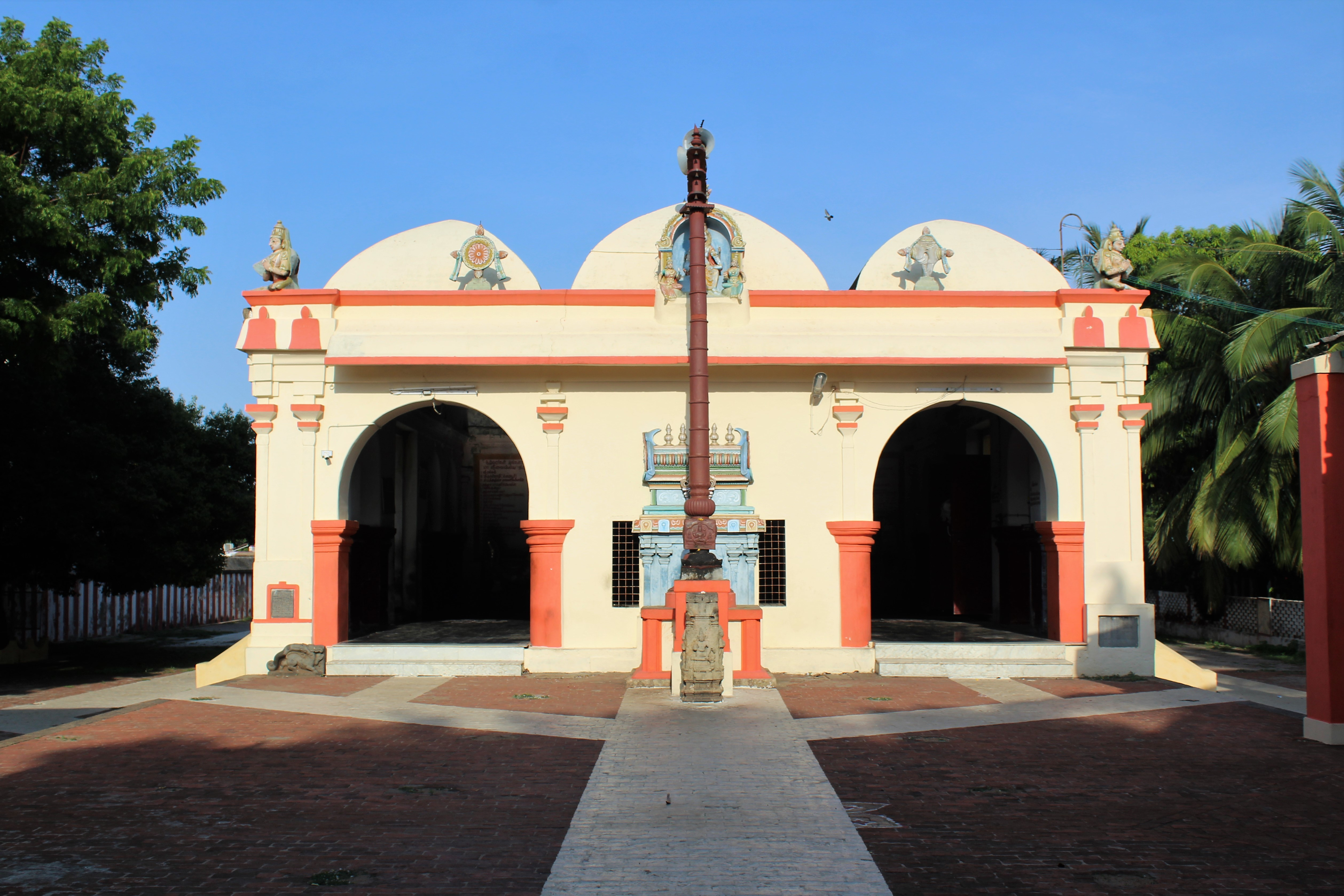
Manikundra Perumal, Neelamegha Perumal temple, Veera Narasimha Perumal temple

The temple finds its sacred origin in a legend from the Brahmanda Purana. During the Treta Yuga, there were three demons by name Tanchakan, Tantakan, and Kacamukan who were blessed by Shiva and became very powerful. They grew arrogant and troubled sage Parashara who was doing penance at this place. Vishnu killed Thanjakan with his discus, called the Sudarshana Chakra. Tancakan pleaded with Vishnu to relieve him off the curse, and Vishnu named the place after his name, and hence it came to be named as Thanjavur. Kachamukan was killed by Vishnu taking the form of a Yali, a mythical creature. Vishnu took the form of Varaha the boar to kill the third demon Tantakan, who fled to Srimushnam.

== Architecture ==
The temples are located in the banks of Vennaaru River. Manikunram has a small east facing shrine with the Lord and consort in the same sanctum. All of the Nammalvar pasurams (poems) of Thanjai refer to this shrine. Maamanikoil has a small east facing shrine with the Manikundra perumal and consort in the same sanctum sported in seated posture. The shrine is located in an elevated structure. All of the Thirumangai Alvar's pasurams (poems) of Thanjai refer to this shrine. There is a separate shrine for Ambujavalli. The waterbody associated with the temples is called Rama Theertham.

Neelamegha Perumal temple has a three-tiered rajagopuram and the sanctum faces east. The presiding deity Neelamegha perumal is sported in veetrirunda posture. There is a separate shrine of Sengamalli Thayar. The water body of the temple is called Amrutha Theertham. The precinct around the sanctum has images of Hayagreeva, Vedanta Desikar, Alvars and Garuda.

Thanjiyali Nagar also called Veera Narasimha Perumal has a small east facing shrine with the main deity and his consort in the same sanctum. All of the Bhoothathalvar pasurams (poems) of Thanjai refer to this shrine. The temple has a flat entrance tower and a single precinct. Veera Narasimha Perumal is sculpted in a seated posture giving darshan to sage Markandeya. The shrine over the sanctum is called Vedasundara Vimana and the water body associated with it is called Surya Pushkarani.

The temples are maintained and administered by the Hindu Religious and Charitable Endowments Department of the Government of Tamil Nadu along with Thanjavur Palace Devasthanam.

== Festival and literary mention ==
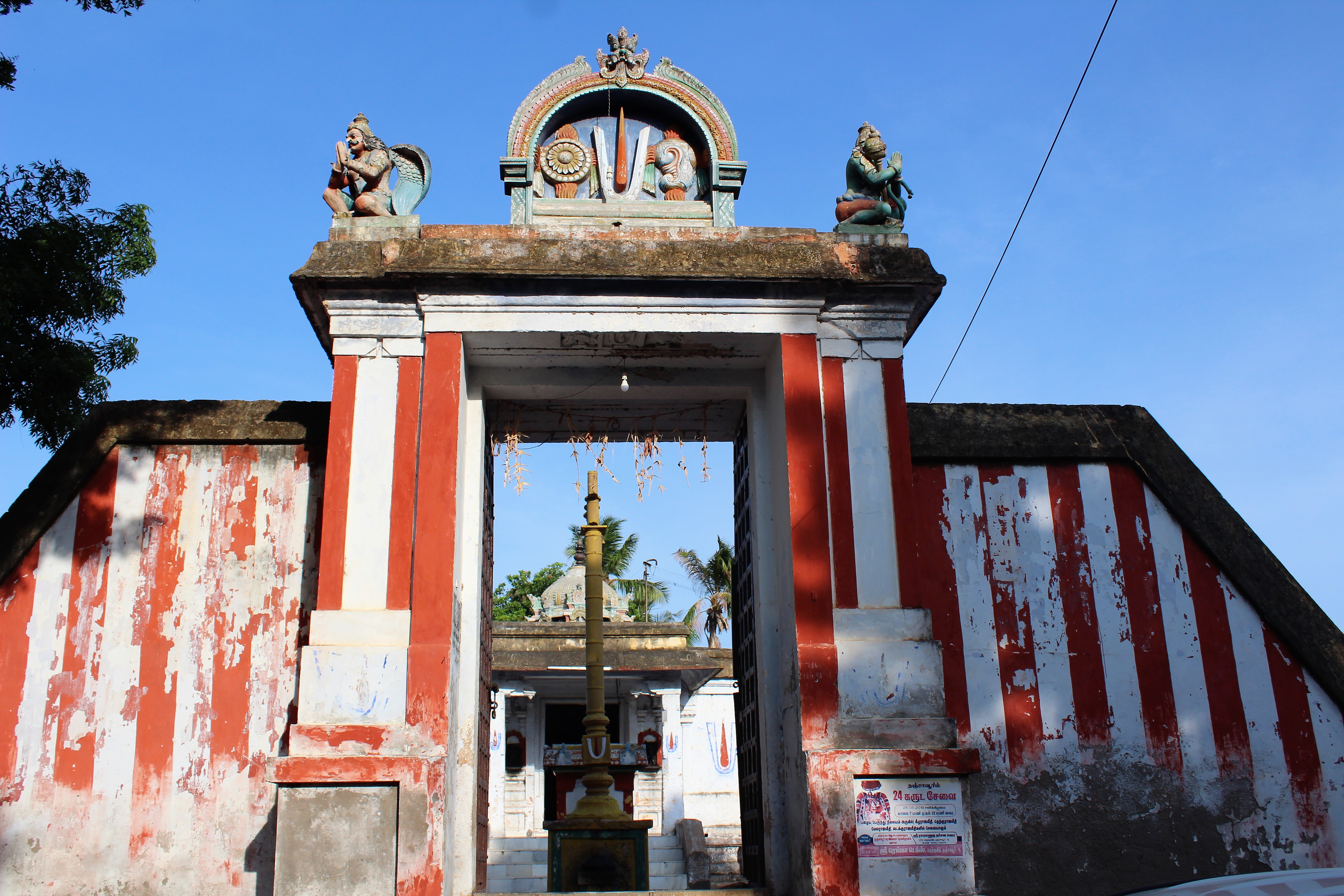
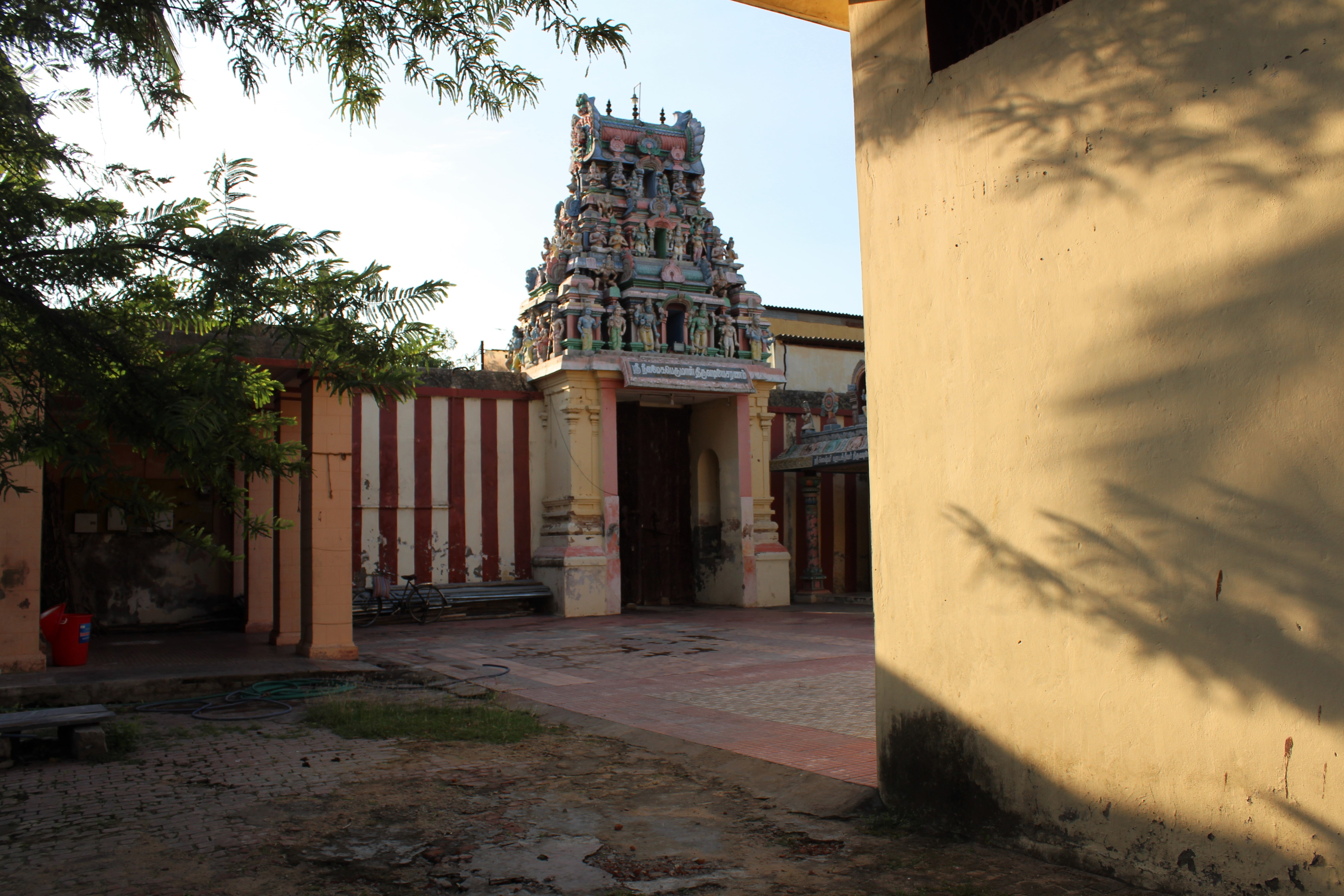
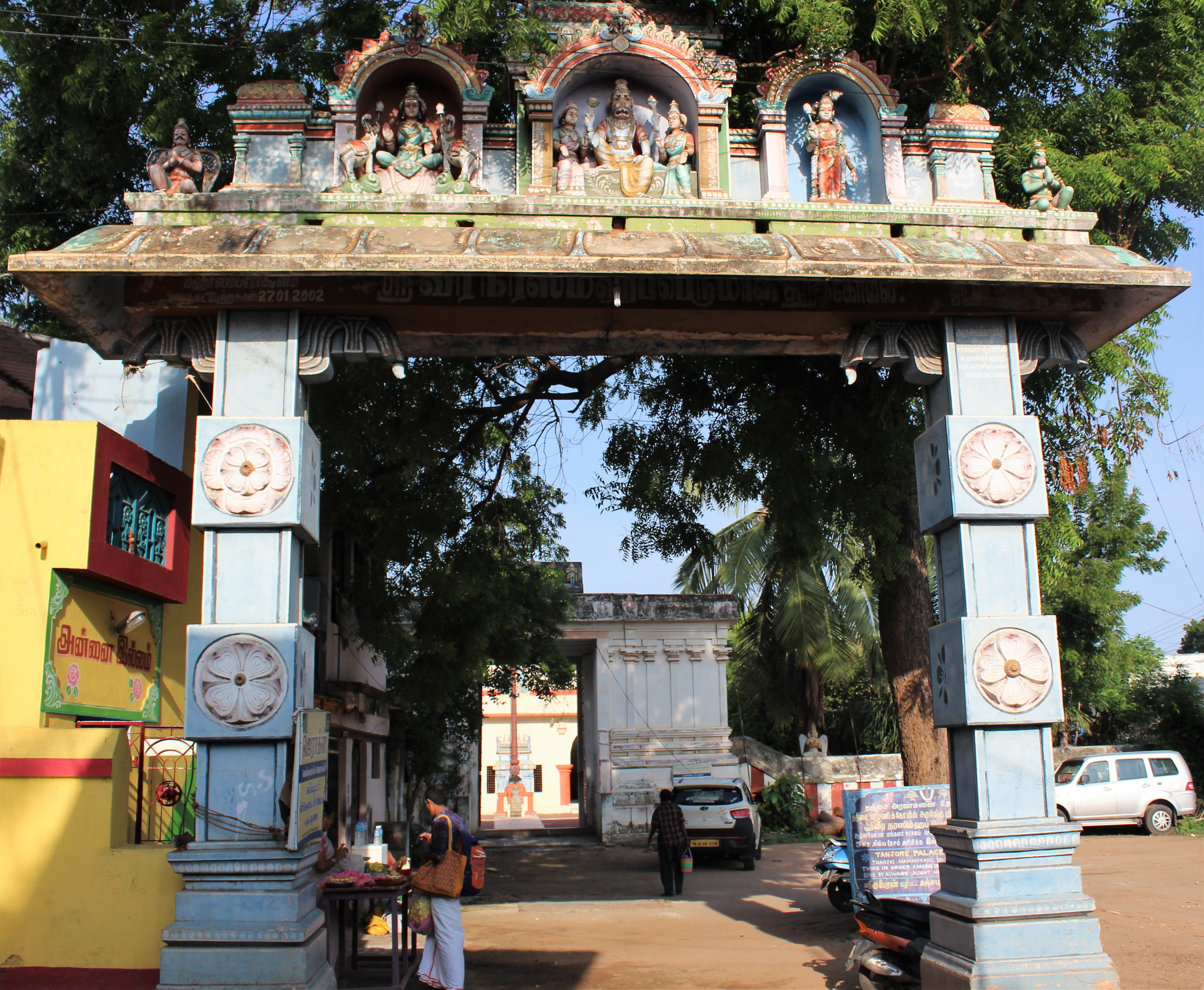
Manikundra Perumal, Neelamegha Perumal temple, Veera Narasimha Perumal temple

The Garuda Sevai function during the Tamil month of Vaikasi has assembly of 18 Garuda festive deities from 18 different temples.

The temples are mentioned in Naalayira Divya Prabandham, the 7th–9th century Vaishnava canon, by Thirumangai Alvar and Bhoothathalvar in one hymn each. The temple is classified as a Divya Desam, one of the 108 Vishnu temples that are mentioned in the book.
