= Adanur =

- village
- Location in Karnataka, India Adanur (India)
- Coordinates: 14.05°N 76.17°E
- Country: India
- State: Karnataka
- District: Chitradurga

Languages
  - Official: Kannada
- Time zone: UTC+5:30 (IST)

Adanuru or Adnooru (also referred to as Aadanooru in local Kannada language) is a village in Holalkere taluk of Chitradurga district in the Karnataka state of Southern India. It is situated around 5 kilometers from Holalkere on Holalkere - Davanagere state highway (SH-19).

In the local Dravidian language, the name translates to 'Aadina' + 'Ooru' viz. Village of Rams. As with other villages in the vicinity, this signifies the tribal roots of the region.
