= Tiruvelukkai =

Hindu temple in Kanchipuram

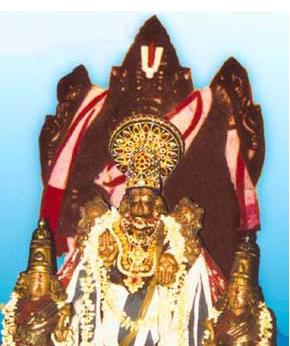
- Images of the temple's deities

- Location in Tamil Nadu

Religion
- Affiliation: Hinduism
- District: Kanchipuram district
- Deity: Aḻagiya Singar (Vishnu); Amuthavalli (Lakshmi)

Location
- Location: Kanchipuram
- State: Tamil Nadu
- Country: India
- Coordinates: 12°49′20″N 79°42′24″E

Architecture
- Type: Dravidian architecture

Tiruvelukkai located in Kanchipuram in the South Indian state of Tamil Nadu, is dedicated to the Hindu god Vishnu. Constructed in the Dravidian style of architecture, the temple is glorified in the Nalayira Divya Prabandham, the early medieval Tamil canon of the Alvar saints from the 6th–9th centuries CE. It is one of the 108 Divya Desams dedicated to Vishnu, who is worshipped as Aḻagiya Singar (Narasimha) and his consort Lakshmi as Amruthavalli. This is the smallest divyadesam in Kanchipuram, however Vedanta Desika wrote a kamasikashtakam on this perumal.

The temple is believed to have been built by the Pallavas of the late 8th century CE, with later contributions from Medieval Cholas and Vijayanagara kings. The temple has three inscriptions on its walls, two dating from the period of Kulothunga Chola I (1070–1120 CE) and one to that of Rajadhiraja Chola (1018-54 CE). A granite wall surrounds the temple, enclosing all the shrines and two bodies of water. There is a 3-tiered rajagopuram, the temple's gateway tower, in the temple.

== Legend ==
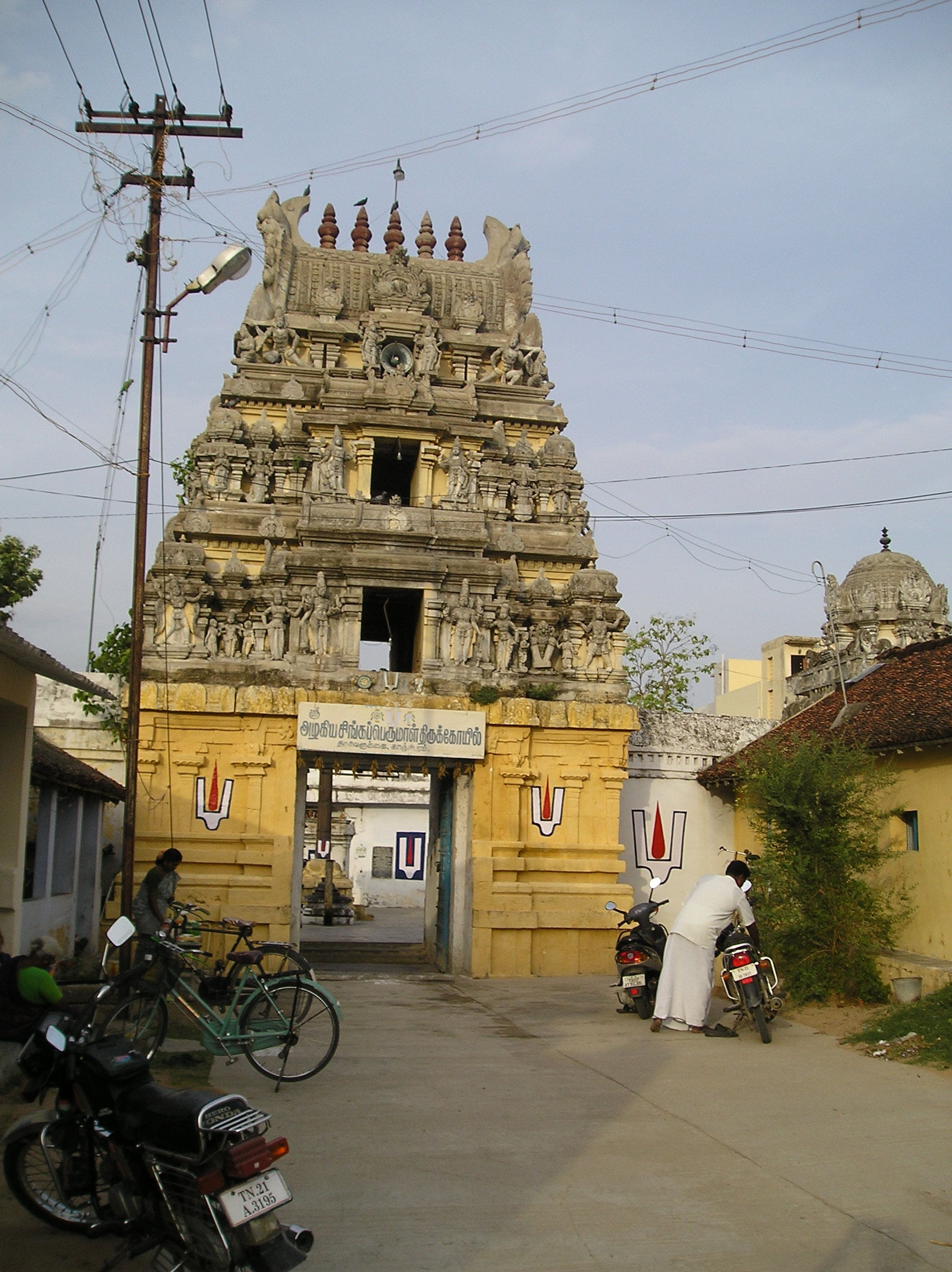
Temple gateway

Velukkai is derived from Vel (desire) and irukkai (place of stay), meaning the place where Vishnu desired to stay, which became Velukkai from Velirukkai. It is believed that the original image of the temple was east facing standing posture of Vishnu as he appeared for Bhrigu Maharishi and later appeared as Aḻagiya Singar. According to the temple's regional legend, once, there was an argument between Saraswati, the consort of Brahma and Lakshmi on superiority. They went to Indra, the king of the celestial deities. Indra judged Lakshmi as superior. Not satisfied with his argument, Saraswati went to her husband, Brahma. He also chose Lakshmi to be the superior one. Saraswati was unhappy with the decision and decided to stay away from Brahma. Brahma did a severe penance praying to Vishnu and did an ashvamedha yajna. Saraswati was still angry that the yajna, which usually is done along with consorts was done alone by Brahma. She tried to disrupt the penance in various ways, but Vishnu interfered in all her attempts. After all the demons were killed by Vishnu, who were sent by Saraswati to destroy the yajna (penance) done by Brahma, she sent Kapalika, a demon. Vishnu took the form of Narhari to kill the demon.

The temple is classified as a Divya Desam, one of the 108 Vishnu temples that are mentioned in the

== Architecture ==
The presiding deity is Narasimhar (also called Mukunda Nayaka) is depicted in a seated posture facing west. The temple has three shrines, one each for the presiding deity Aḻagiya Singar, one for his consort Amruthavalli and one for Garuda.

== Sources ==
- Ramesh, M. S. (1992). 108 Vaishnavite Divya Desams: Divya desams in Chola Nadu. T.T. Devasthanams.
- R., Dr. Vijayalakshmy (2001). An introduction to religion and Philosophy - Tévarám and Tivviyappirapantam (1st ed.). Chennai: International Institute of Tamil Studies.
