= Thirukadalmallai =

Perumal temple in Kanchipuram district, Tamil Nadu, India

Sthalasayana Perumal Temple
- Thirukadalmallai
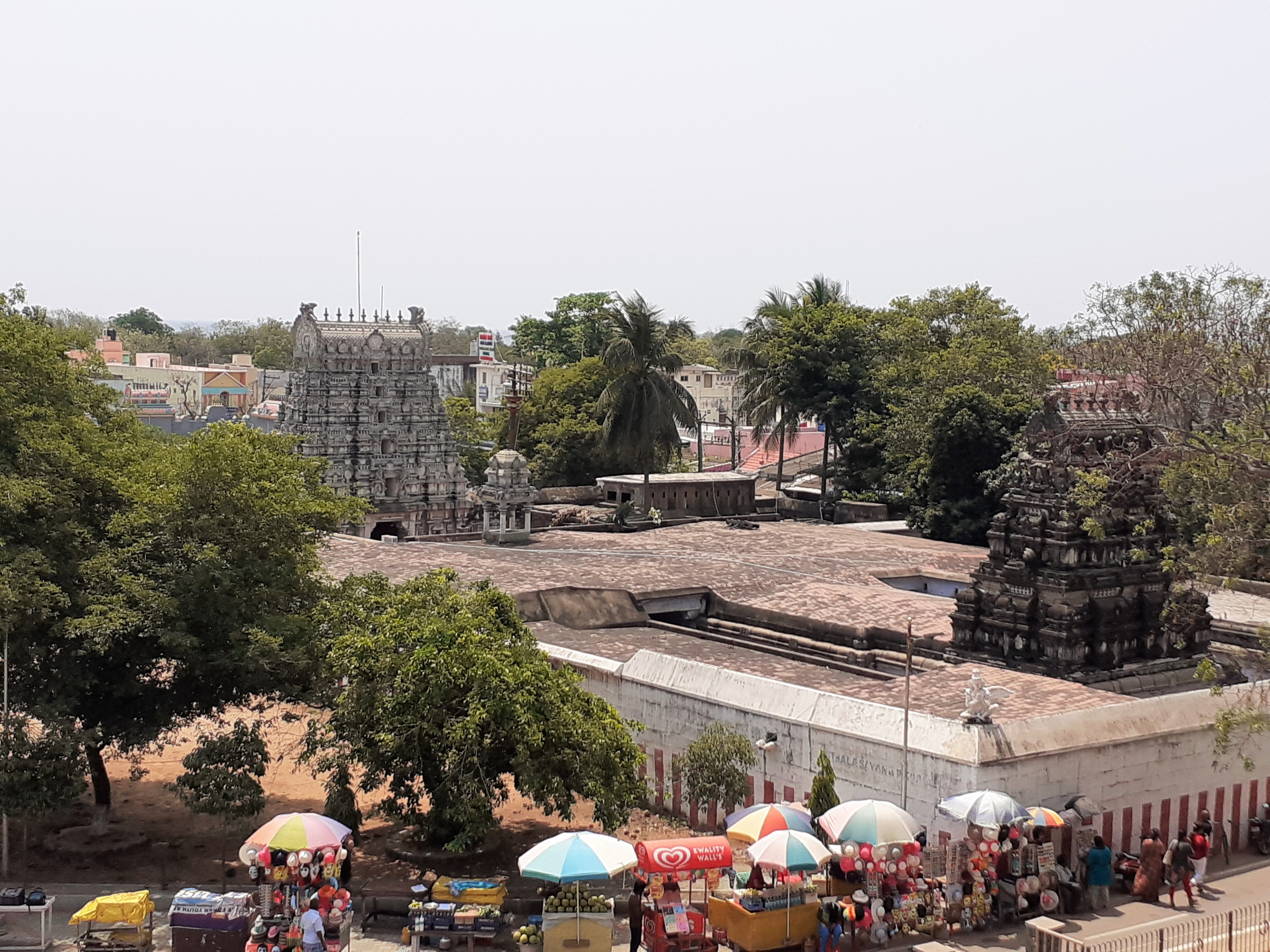

- Location in Tamil Nadu

Religion
- Affiliation: Hinduism
- District: Chengalpattu
- Deity: Sri Sthalasayana Perumal Nilamangai Thayaar
- Features: Tower: GaganaKriti Vimanam; Temple tank: Pundarika Pushkarni

Location
- Location: Mahabalipuram
- State: Tamil Nadu
- Country: India
- Coordinates: 12°37′0″N 80°11′55″E

Architecture
- Type: Dravidian architecture

Sthalasayana Perumal Temple, (also called Thirukadalmallai) is located in Mahabalipuram, India. Constructed in the Pallavan style of architecture, the temple is glorified in the Naalayira Divya Prabandham, the early medieval Tamil canon of the Alvar saints from the 6th–9th centuries CE. It is one of the 108 Divya Desam dedicated to Vishnu, who is worshipped as Sthalasayana Perumal and his consort Lakshmi as Nilamangai Thayar. The temple is believed to have been built by the Pallavas, with later contributions from the Medieval Cholas, Vijayanagara kings, and Madurai Nayaks.

The temple is believed to be the birthplace of the Vaishnava Alvar saint Bhoothathalvar. Sthalasayana Perumal is believed to have appeared to sage Pundarika. The temple is maintained and administered by the Hindu Religious and Endowment Board of the Government of Tamil Nadu.

== Legend ==
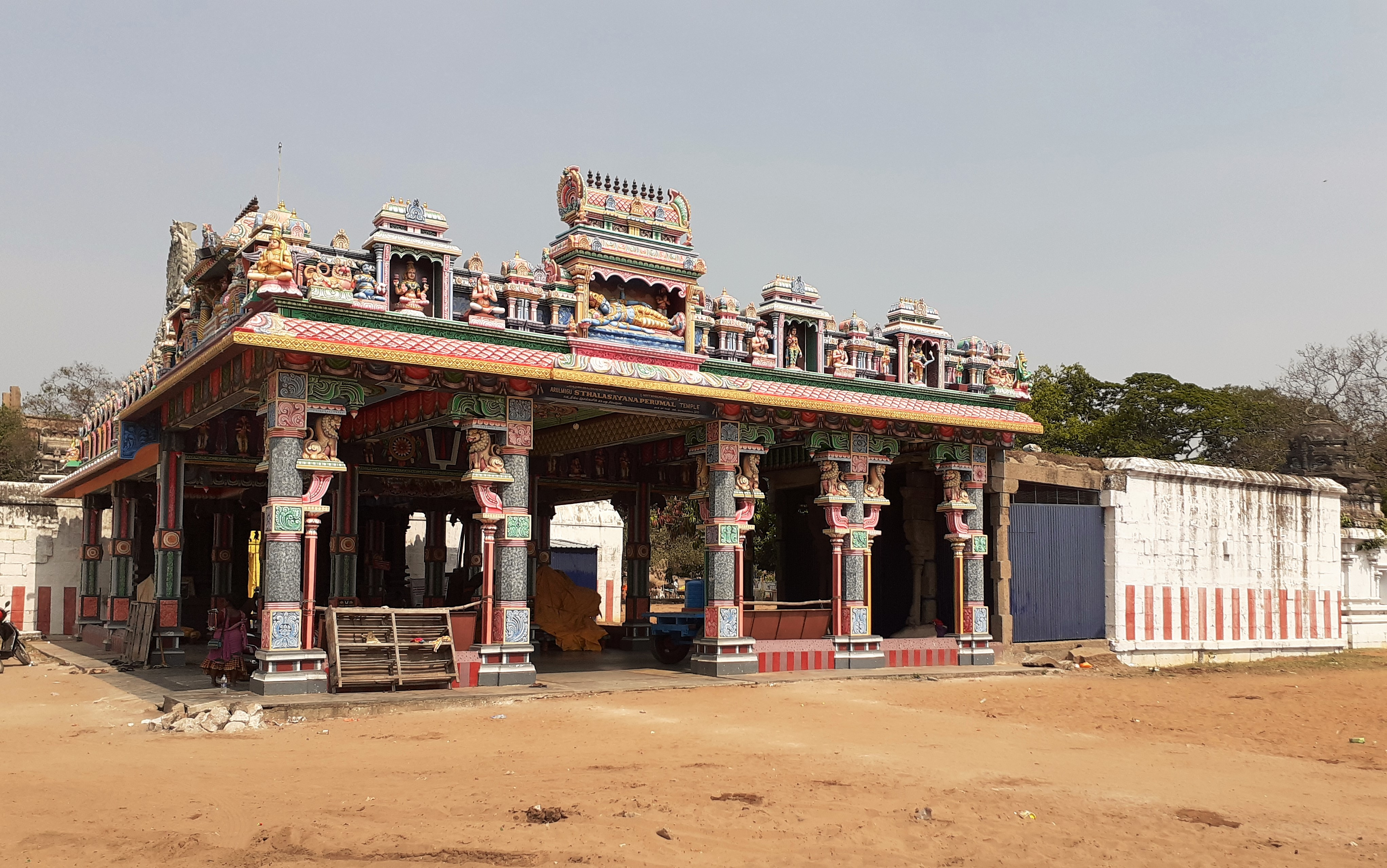
Thirukadalmallai temple

As per Hindu legend, once sage Pundarika was performing penance worshiping Vishnu at this place. He collected Tamarasa flowers and submitted it to view Vishnu in Ksirabdhi Natha form, his posture in Ocean of milk. He collected 1,008 flowers and in his intensity, he scooped out water also in full. Vishnu came in disguise in the form of sage and asked him for food. The sage went to acquire food for the old man, but while returning he found that Vishnu remained in the place. Since Vishnu stayed in this place, he was called Sthalasayana Perumal. The legend is sanctified by Bhoothath Alvar in his verses in Naalayira Divya Prabandham. As per another legend, sage Agastya is believed to have visited the temple and he came around the temple and prostrated before the presiding deity. As per divine intervention, he was advised to remain in Astavasramam in the northern part of Pundreeka Theertham (temple tank).

As per another legend, a king by name Harikesarivarman used to visit the Nithyakalyana Perumal temple at Thiruvidandai everyday from Mahabalipuram and wanted to settle there. Vishnu was pleased by his devotion and appeared as Sthalasayana Perumal at Mahabalipuram.

== History ==
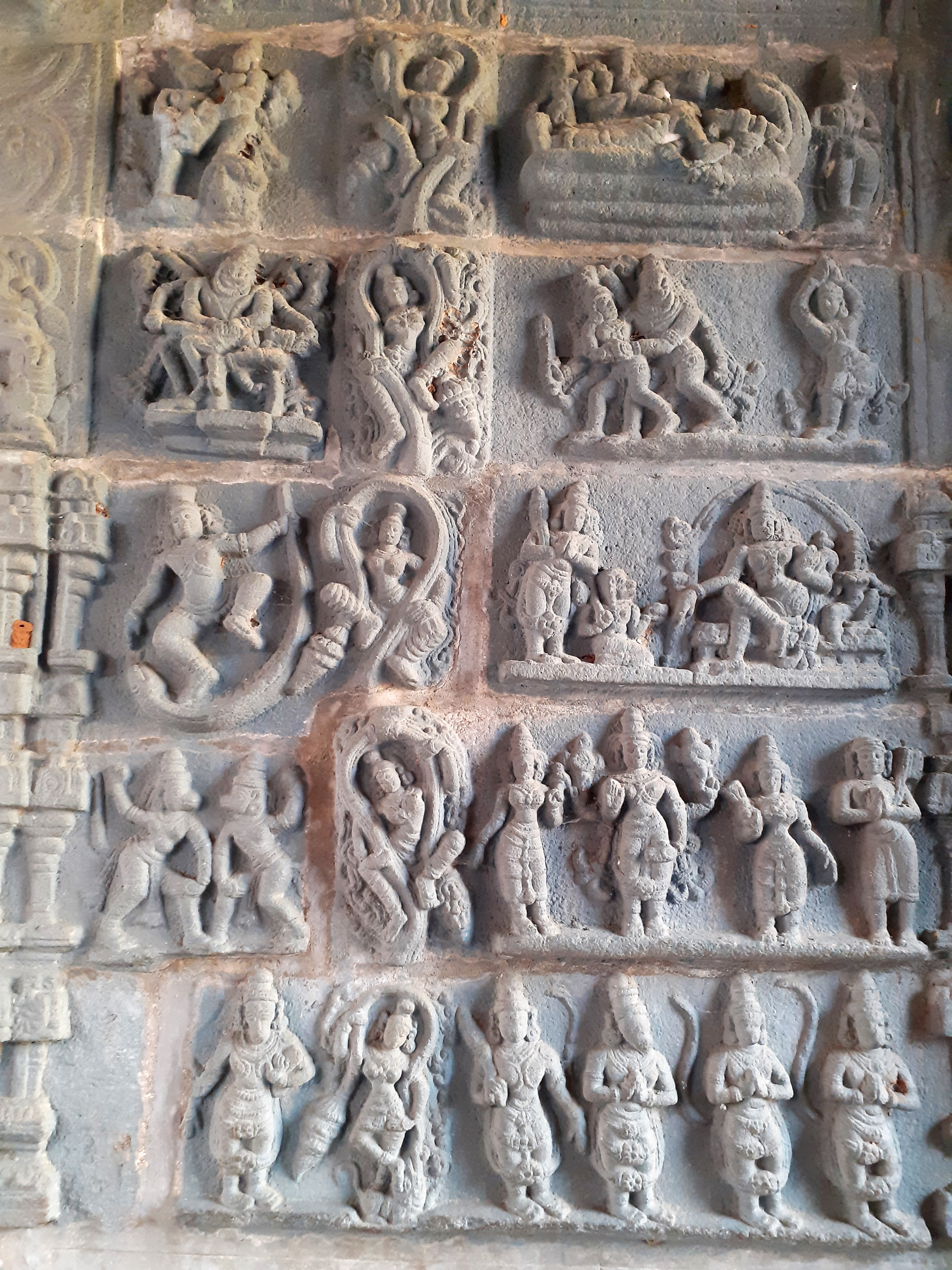
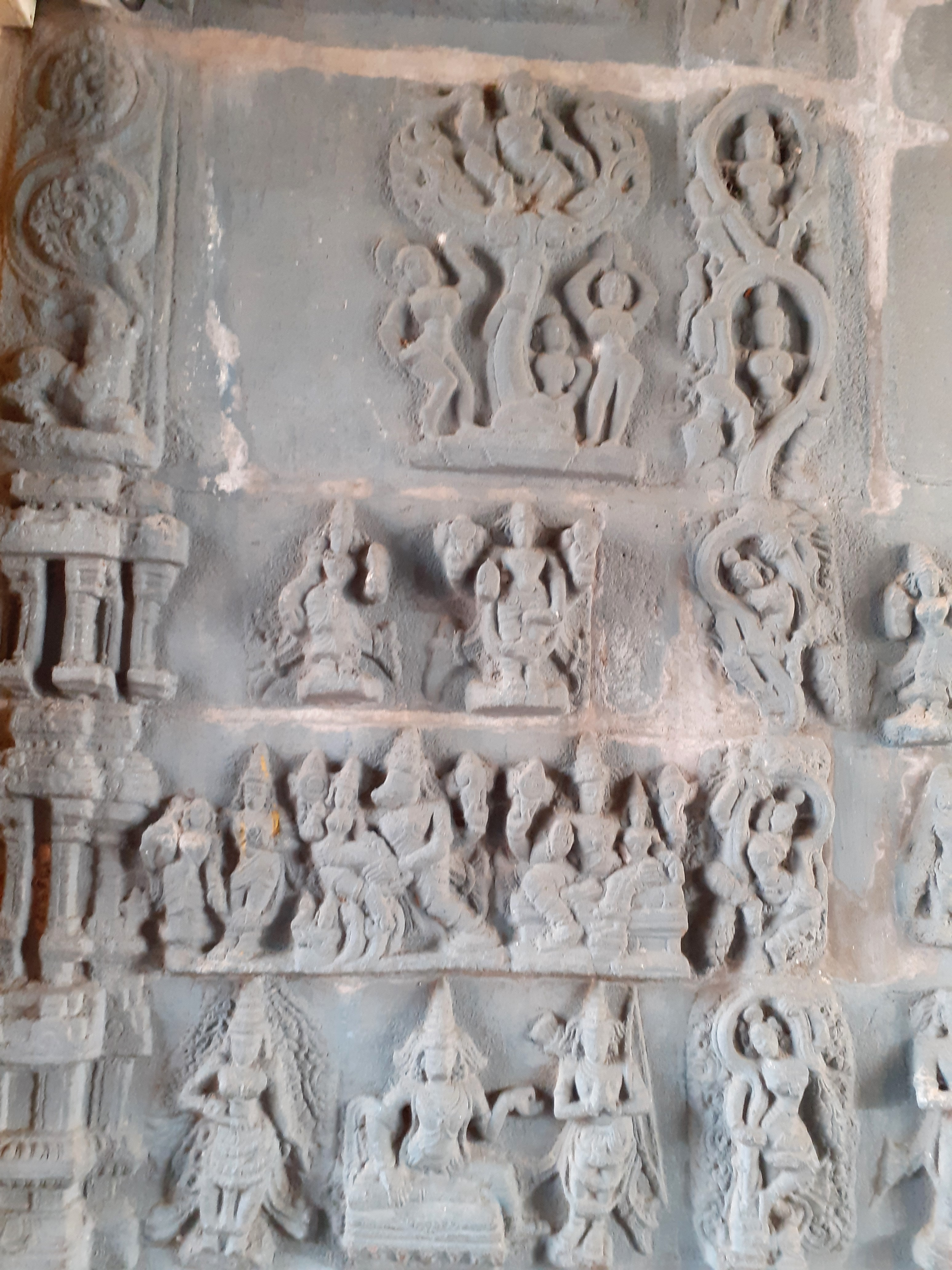
Sculptures on the wall of the temple

References to modern day Mahabalipuram as a busy port is available in the works of Ptolemy from CE 140. There are many references to the place from Sangam Literature from third century CE. The temple is referred in the works of seventh century works of Bhoothath Alvar and eighth century works of Thirumangai Alvar. The port city came to prominence during the reign of Pallava kings Mahendravarman I and his son Narasimhavarman I after whom the city is named. The city was a famous port city during the reign of Medieval Cholas from the 9th century. There are inscriptions in the temple indicating grants of 1000 kulis during the 20th year of reign of Ko-Parakesarivarman. The northern wall has inscriptions of Dalavay Thirumalanayaka giving grants of lands in Kunnatur village to the temple. There are various other inscriptions indicating grants to the temple from various villages. The inscriptions from Shore Temple indicates grant of 2000 kulis of land to the temple during the reign of Rajendra I during the 11 century. There are similar inscriptions from Varaha Cave Temple about grant of lands during the same reign. The temple also had expansions by Chola king Vikrama Chola (1118-35 CE) during 1120 CE. The earliest inscription from the temple is from the reign of Vikrama Chola (1118–1135 CE), but the inscription is damaged. Another inscription made during the reign of Kulothunga Chola II (1133–1150 CE) indicates gift to meet the expenses towards recitation of Thirupalli Ezhuchi in the temple. There are inscriptions from Rajanrayana Sambuvaraya, the feudatory of Cholas. The inscriptions from Telugu Choda dynasty during 1252 CE mentions gifts to Brahmanas for the perpetual lighting of the temple. The inscription made during the reign of Pandyas during 1288 CE indicates gift for the feeding house of the temple.

During the 14th century, the Vijayanagara king Parankusa shifted the temple to its current location away from the shore. He is believed to have built the four Mada streets around the temple. The Shore Temple located on the shore is believed to be the original shrine housing two images of Shiva on either side of the image of Vishnu. There are many land grants made during the rule of the Vijayanagara kings.

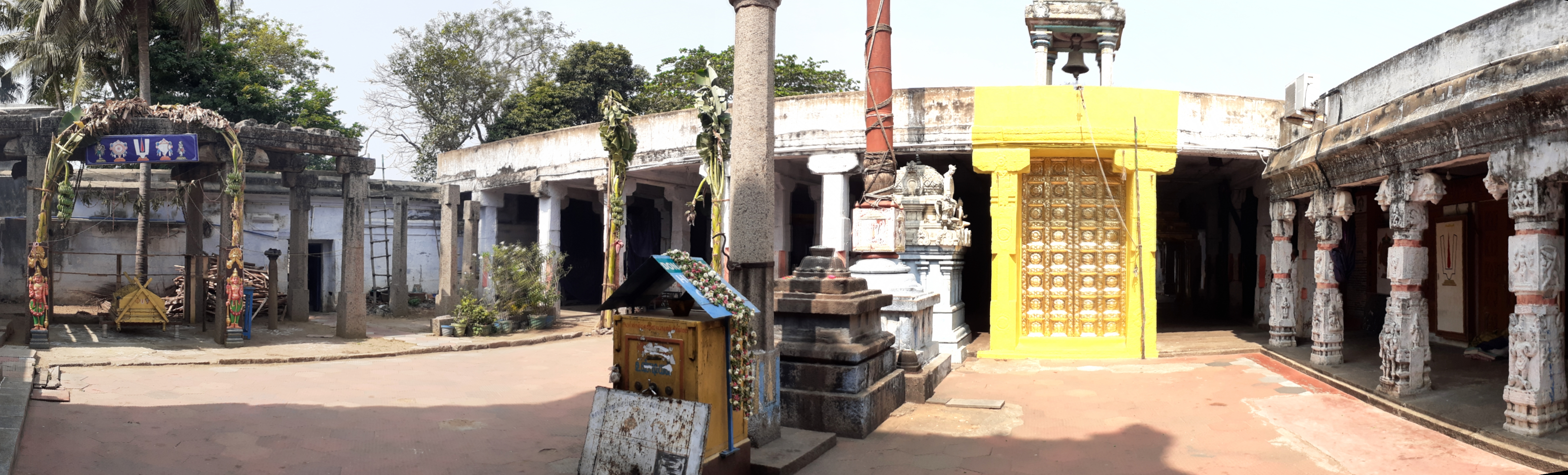
Panoramic view of the temple

== Architecture ==
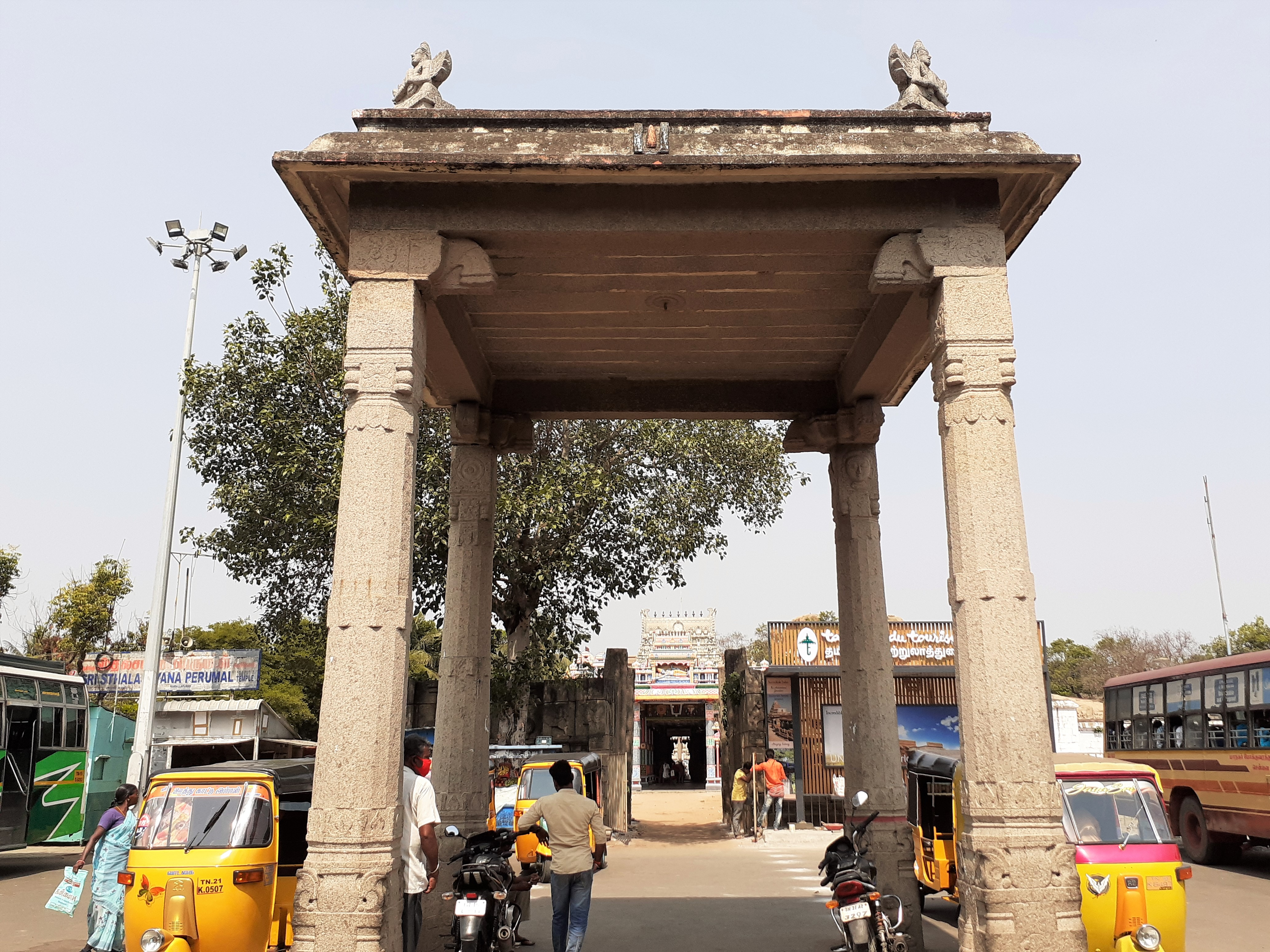
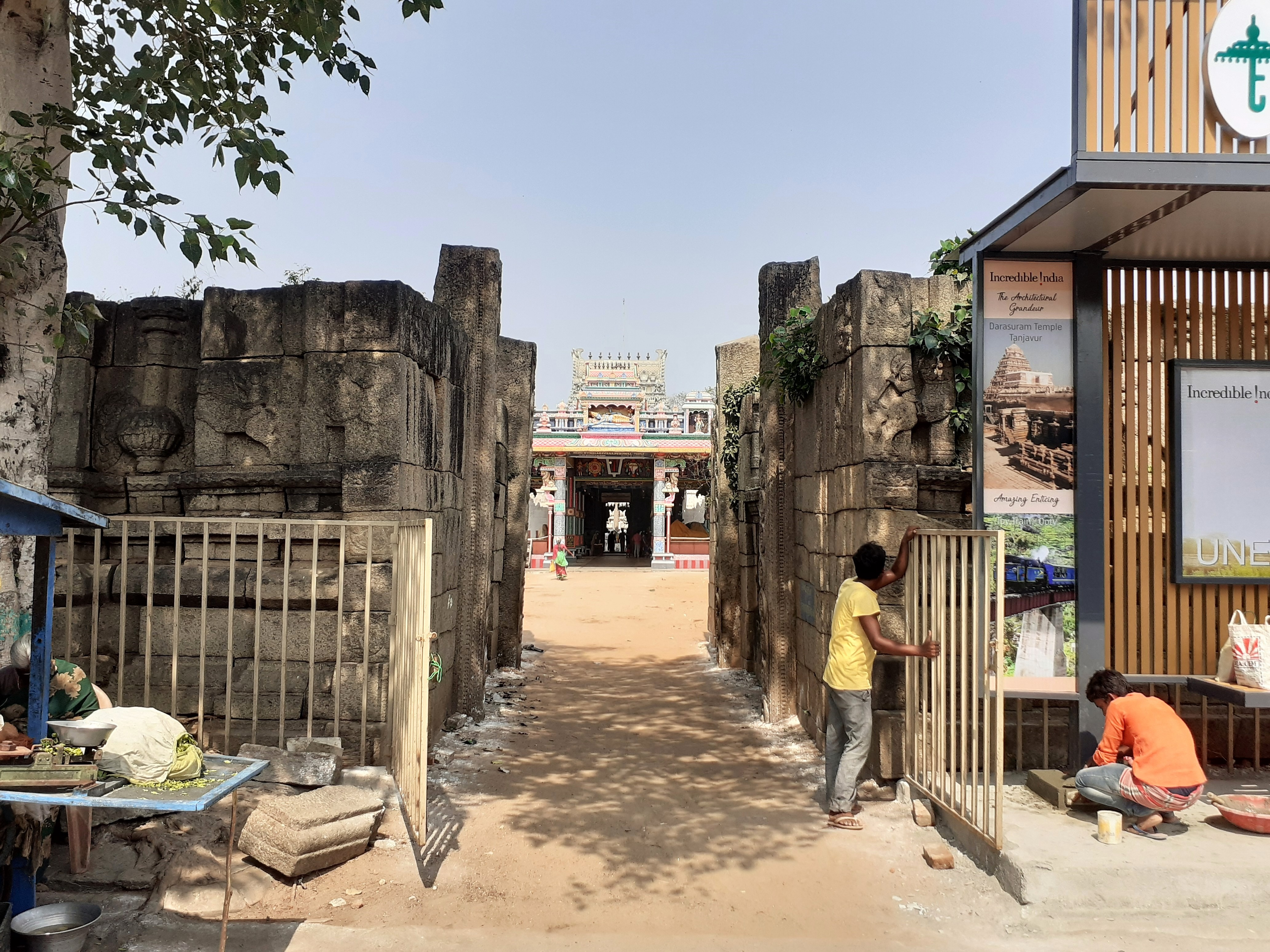
The entrance of the temple

The temple is located in Mahabalipuram, a historic town on the outskirts of Chennai. The temple is located close to Arjuna's Penance, the most famous landmark of the Group of Monuments at Mahabalipuram. The temple is also believed to be the birthplace of Bhoothath Alvar, the 2nd Alvar, the poet saints of 7th-9th centuries. The temple has a seven tiered rajagopuram built during 15-16th century. The granite base of the entrance is studded with sculptures. There are two precincts inside the temple with the sanctum is located axial to the main gate and approached through a Dvajasthambam, bali peetam (sacrificial altar), Deepa Stambam (altar for lamps) and Garuda Mandapam. The sanctum houses the image of Sthalasayana Perumal, the presiding deity, in reclining posture. The image is sported with Ahvahanahasta, which indicates beckoning devotees to him. The image of Pundarika Maharishi is seen in standing posture. The processional deity, namely Ulaguyyaninran, sported with four arms, is housed in the sanctum. There is an east facing shrine to the right of sanctum for Lakshmi, the consort of Perumal, in the form of Nilamangai Thayar. There are shrines for Andal, Lakshmi Narasimha, Bhoothath Alvar, Rama, and Alvars in the first precinct around the sanctum. There is a shrine for Hanuman opposite to the shrine of Rama. There is a four pillared hall, with sculpted pillars in front of the temple, was designed for Dolotsavam (swing festival). The temple tank is located outside the temple and is called Pundarika Pushkarani. It has a small pillared mandapa in its centre.

== Festivals and religious practices ==
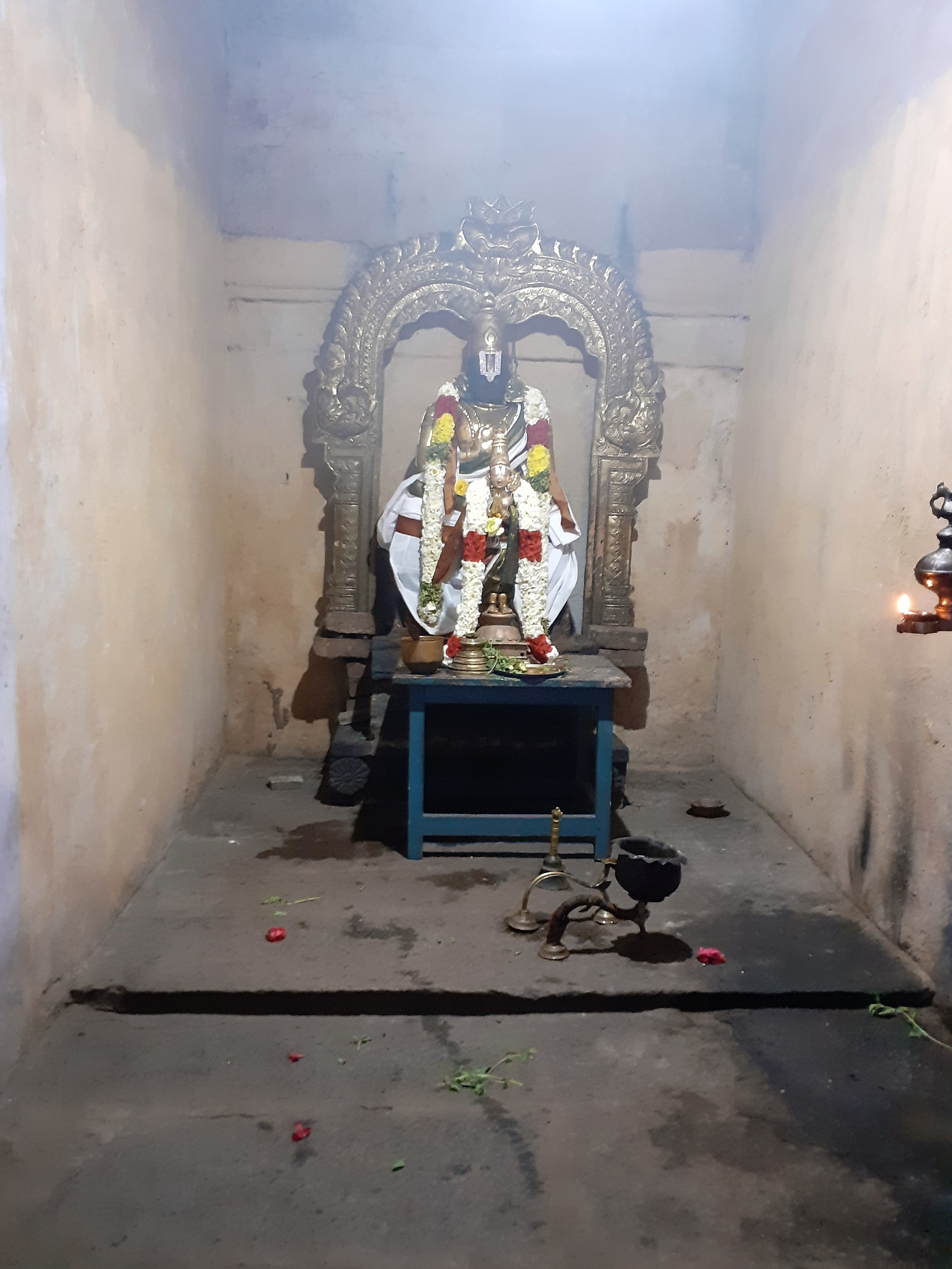
Image of Bhoothath Alvar shrine

Bhoothath Alvar Avata Utsavam, the birth anniversary of Bhoothath Alvar is celebrated every year during the Tamil month of Aippasi (October - November). At around 10 am on the festival day, the festival image of the Alvar is brought in a palanquin to the shrine of Nilamangai Thayar and then to Stalasayana Perumal. After the recital of Periya Tirumoli of Thirumangai Alvar, Kaithala Seva, a practise of providing a special gift to Bhoothath Alvar is performed. Bhootath Alvar also makes a trip to the Cave temple of Mahabalipuram. During the evening, the festival images of the presiding deity of Stalasayana Perumal and Bhoothath Alvar is taken around the streets of the temple.

The temple is revered in Naalayira Divya Prabandham, the 7th–9th century Vaishnava canon, by Thirumangai Alvar and Bhoothath Alvar in one hymn each. The temple is classified as a Divya Desam, one of the 108 Vishnu temples that are mentioned in the book. Thirumangai Alvar considers the reclining form of Vishnu special as it is the only place where he reclines in ground without his traditional snake Adiseshan.

== Administration ==
The temple is one of the 32 Group of Monuments at Mahabalipuram that are declared as UN world heritage sites, but unlike others that are maintained by the Archaeological Survey of India (ASI), the temple is maintained and administered by the Hindu Religious and Endowment Board of the Government of Tamil Nadu. ASI had a proposal to bring the maintenance of the temple under its jurisdiction in July 2012. Following widespread protest by locals and shopkeepers the proposal was dropped by the central ministry of Culture in September 2013.
