= Nithyakalyana Perumal temple =

Perumal temple in Kanchipuram district, Tamil Nadu, India

Nithyakalyana Perumal Temple
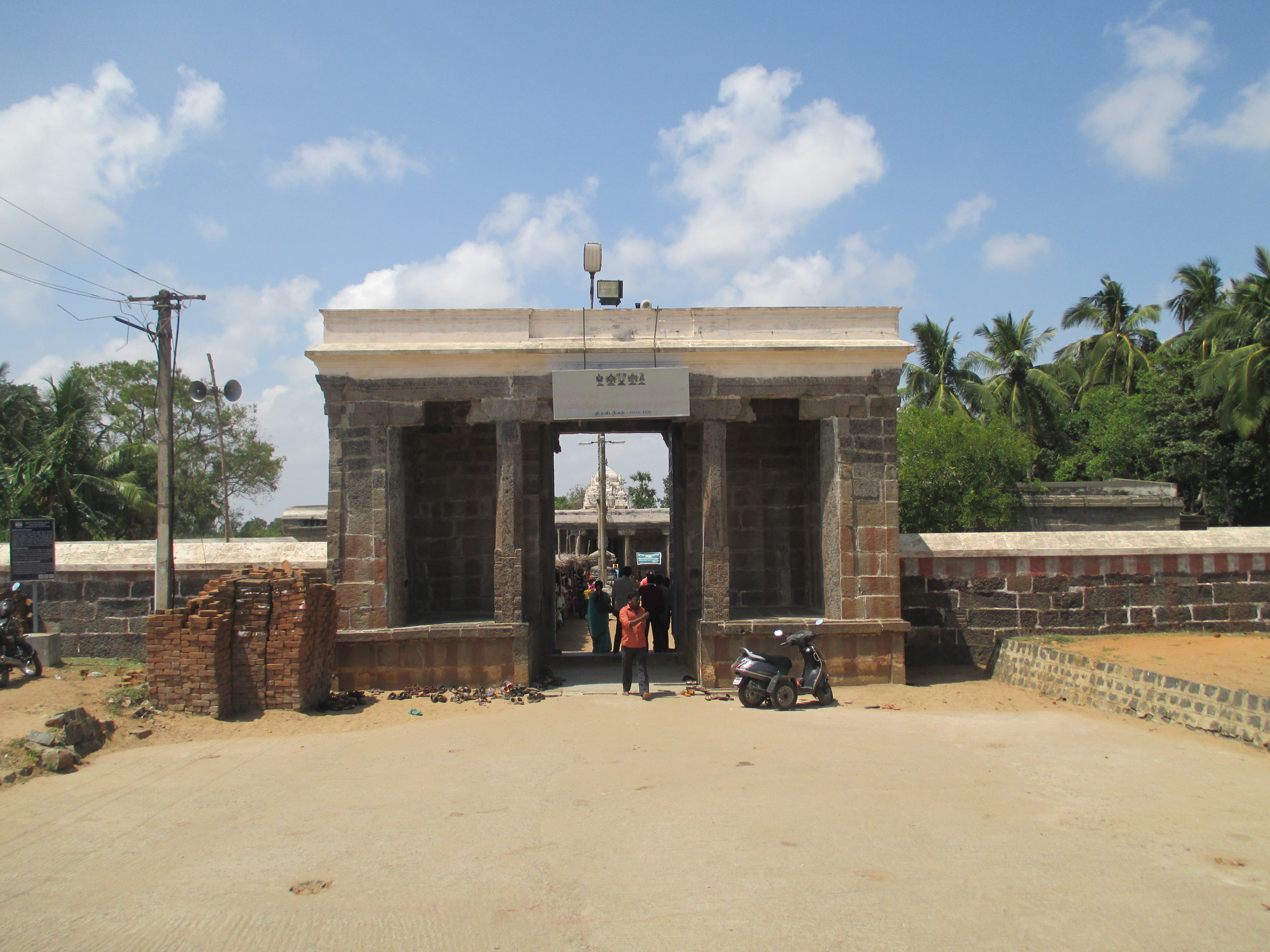

- Nithyakalyana Perumal Temple, Thiruvidanthai, Chengalpattu, Tamil Nadu

Religion
- Affiliation: Vaishnavism
- District: Chengalpattu
- Deity: Nithyakalyana Perumal (Varaha); Komalavalli Thayar (Lakshmi)
- Features: Tower: Kalyana Vimanam; Temple tank: Kalyana Theertham

Location
- Location: Thiruvidandai, Chennai
- State: Tamil Nadu
- Country: India
- Coordinates: 12°45′47.9″N 80°14′31.2″E

Architecture
- Type: Dravidian architecture
- Elevation: 21.76 m (71 ft)

Nithyakalayana Perumal temple in Thiruvidandai, a village in Chennai, Chengalpattu district of the South Indian state of Tamil Nadu, is dedicated to Varaha, the boar avatar of the Hindu god Vishnu. Constructed in the Dravidian architecture, the temple is glorified in the Naalayira Divya Prabandham, the early medieval Tamil canon of the Alvar saints from the 6th–9th centuries CE. It is one of the 108 Divya Desams dedicated to Vishnu, who is worshipped as Nithyakalayana Perumal (Varaha) and his consort Lakshmi as Komalavalli Thayar. The original structure of the temple was built by the Pallavas during the 7th century CE, with later additions from the Cholas during the 11th century.

A granite wall surrounds the temple, enclosing all its shrines. The temple tank is located opposite to the temple, outside the main entrance. The temple follows the Tenkalai tradition of worship. Four daily rituals and many yearly festivals are held at the temple, of which the Chittirai Brahmotsavam during the Tamil month of Chittirai (during April–May), and Vaikuntha Ekadashi during Margali (December–January), are being the most prominent. The temple is maintained and administered by the Hindu Religious and Endowment Board of the Government of Tamil Nadu.

== Legend ==
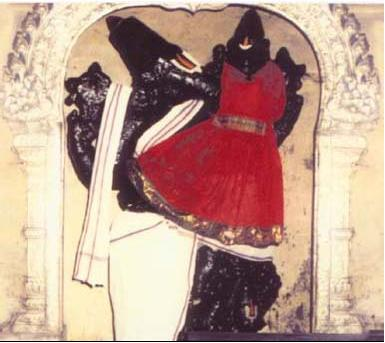
Varaha, the presiding deity of the temple

According to legend, Vishnu's gatekeepers Jaya and Vijaya are cursed by sages that they would be born as asuras during their next birth. They were born on earth as Hiranyaksha and Hiranyakashipu to sage Kashyapa and his wife Diti. The demon brothers on account of their powers, take control of the universe. The elder brother Hiranyaksha practices penance and obtains a boon from Brahma which makes him invincible by any animal or human. Hiranyaksha captures earth, personified as goddess Bhudevi and hides her under the Causal Ocean called Garbhodhaka. All the celestial deities and sages went to Vishnu for rescue. Since Hiranyaksha did not include the boar in the list of animals that can slay him, Vishnu assumes this form with huge tusks and goes down to the primordial ocean. Hiranyaksha obstructs Varaha and the pair having a strong duel. Varaha lifts the earth on his tusks, which would go on to be the most common figurine representation of Varaha. The two fought each other with their mace, with Varaha emerging victorious after a thousand-year duel. Varaha emerges from the Causal Ocean with the earth in his tusks and repositions her in her original spot. The earth goddess Bhudevi falls in love with Varaha, whom he is believed to have taken in his lap in this place. A number of maidens awaited to marry the divine looking boar Varaha. As per the wish of sage Kalava, who wanted Vishnu to marry his 360 daughters. Lakshmi took those 360 forms and marries Varaha in one form each per day during the course of the whole year. Since he is believed to marry maidens daily, he came to be known as Nithyakalyana Perumal (meaning the deity who marries for eternity).

As per another legend, a king by name Harikesarivarman used to visit the temple every day from Mahabalipuram and wanted to settle at this place. Vishnu was pleased by his devotion and appeared as Sthalasayana Perumal at Mahabalipuram – the legend is associated with the Thirukadalmallai temple at Mahabalipuram.

== History ==
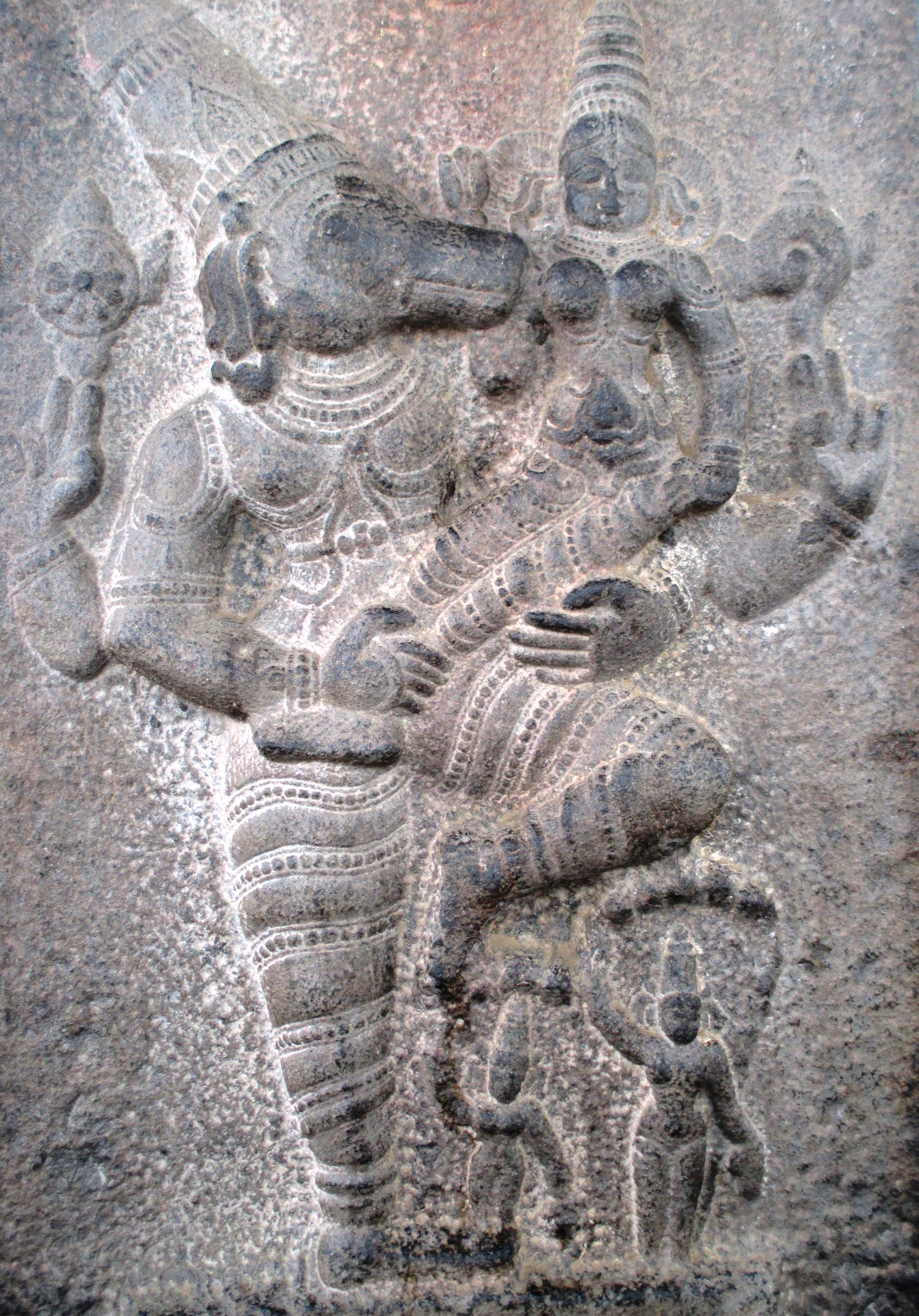
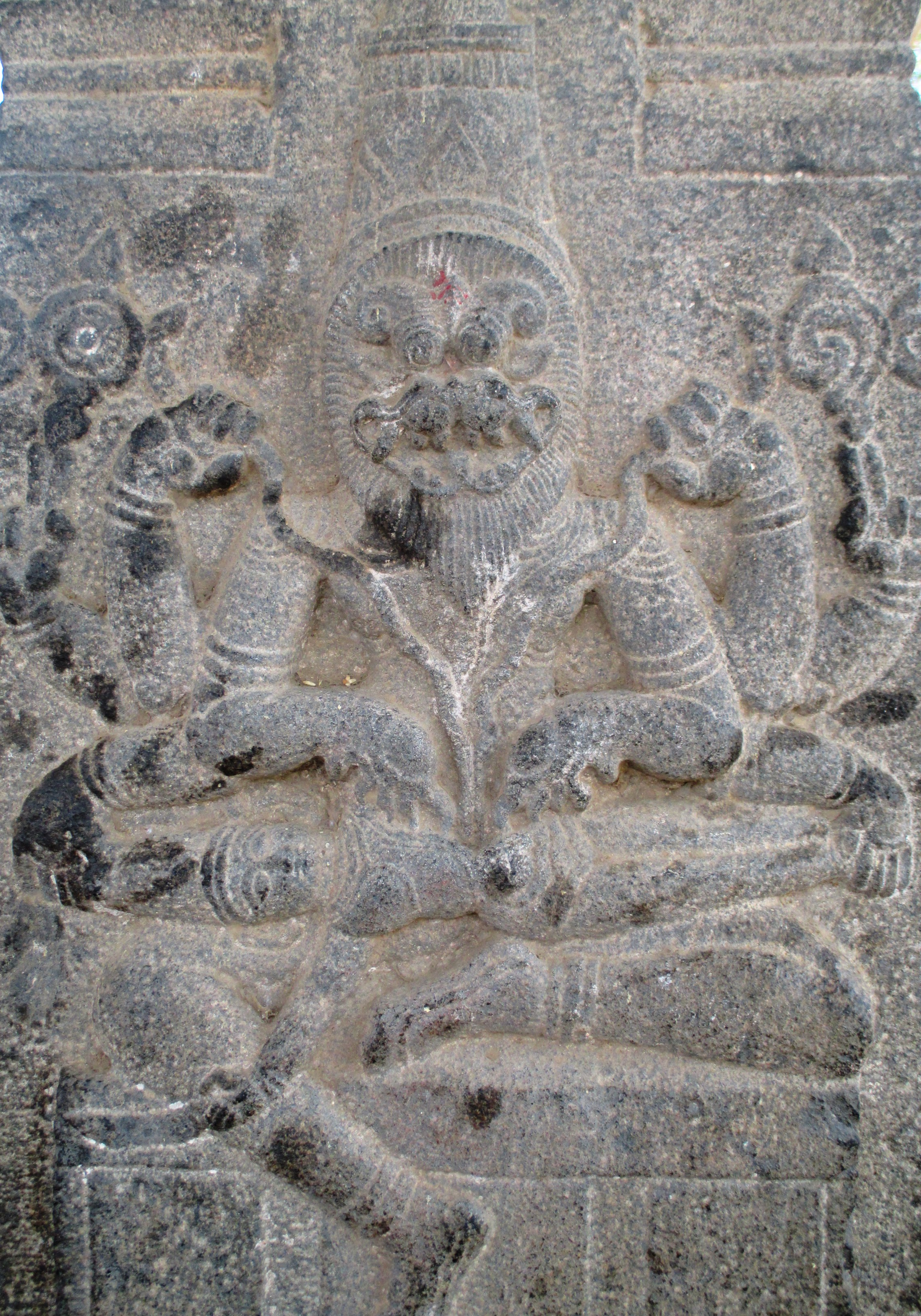
Sculptures of Varaha and Narasimha on the pillars

The temple was built during the Pallava regime in the 7th century. Kanchipuram was the capital of the Pallavas who ruled the region during the 6th to 9th centuries. They had Mamallapuram and Thiruvidanthai as their port towns and the two towns emerged as strong ports for the Empire. The temple is believed to have been built along with the monumental temples in the region. The temple has inscriptions dated 959 CE from the Pallava times.

One of the earliest inscriptions in the temple is from Rashtrakuta king Krishna III (939–67) during 959 CE indicating gift of lamp to the temple. There were later additions from the Chola kings as indicated from an inscription during the 35th regnal year of Rajadhiraja Chola during 1052 CE. Raja Raja Chola is believed to have commissioned the Panguni Uthiram festival during 1003 CE. There are inscriptions indicating benevolent contributions from Kulothunga Chola I during 1115 CE. The temple is a declared monument of the Archaeological Survey of India on account of the inscriptions in the temple. It is maintained as a monument under the Chennai circle and Mamallapuram subcircle of the institution. The temple has a palanquin made of ivory, the one of its kind for any Hindu temple. There are inscriptions during the period of Jatavarman Vira Pandyan II indicating gifts to the goddess of the temple.

== Architecture ==
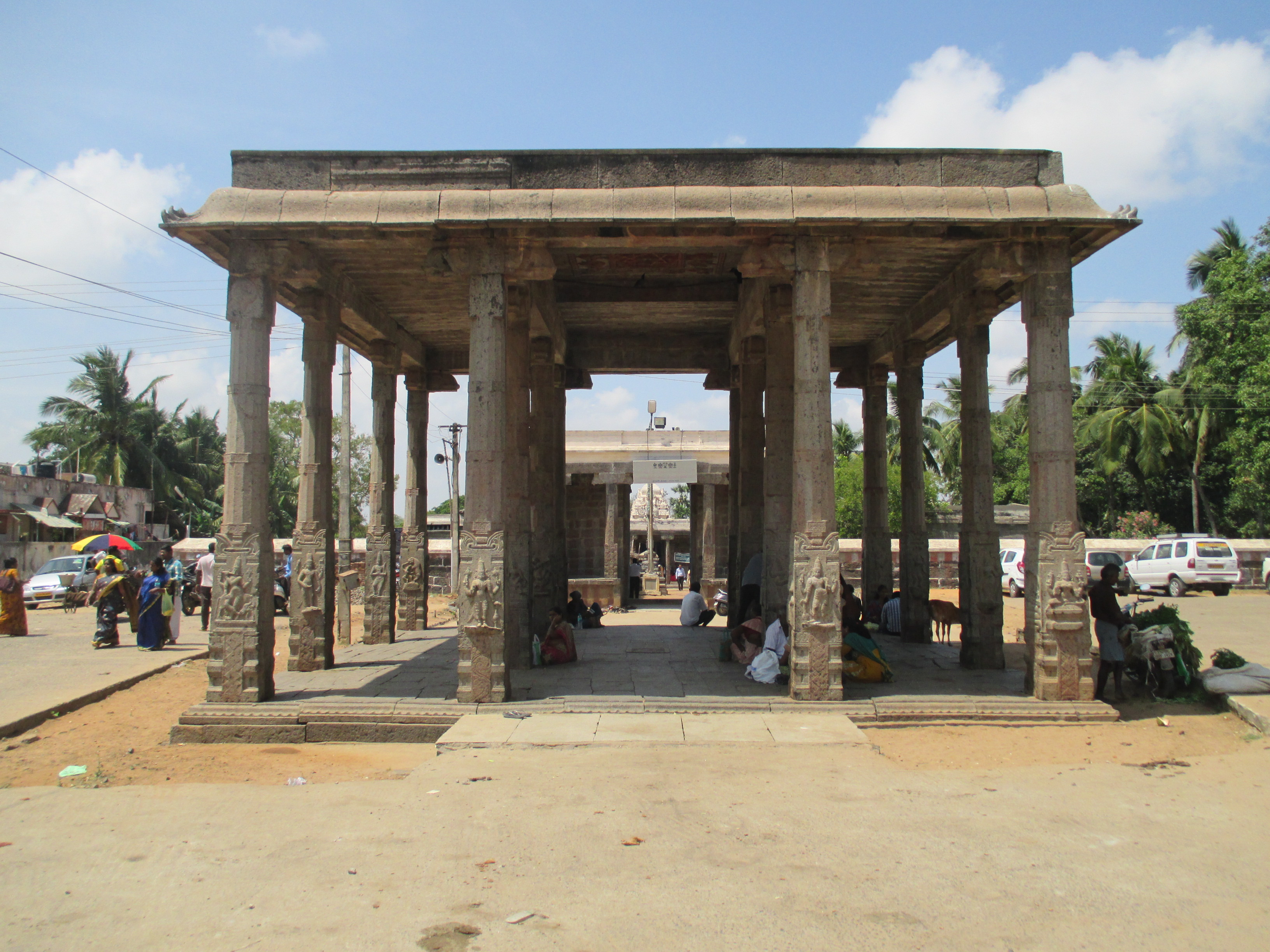
The image of the pillared hall with sculptures before the temple

Nithyakalyana Perumal temple is located in Thiruvidandai, a village in Chennai at Kanchipuram district on the Chennai - Mahabalipuram East Coast Road, 38 km (24 mi) from Chennai City. The sanctum is approached through a sixteen pillared sculpted hall in front of the temple. The pillars have sculptures indicating various legends, with one of them carrying the replica of the image of the presiding deity. The temple has two precincts approached through two flat gateway towers. All the shrines in the temple are enclosed within granite walls. The second precinct has two temple masts, each of them located axial to the sanctum and the entrance. The precinct also has a hall to house the temple chariot. The sanctum is approached through an assembly and prayer hall. The granite image of Nithyakalyana Perumal in the form of Varaha having Bhudevi on his lap, is housed in the sanctum. The image is around 7 ft (2.1 m) tall and is one of the rarest images of the deity. Garuda, the eagle vahana of Vishnu has a small shrine facing the sanctum. The shrine of Ranganathar is located in the first precinct, parallel to the sanctum. The North-West corner of the temple houses the shrine of Komalavalli. There is a separate shrine for Ranganatha and his consort Ranganayaki around the first precinct. The shrine of Andal is located to the left of sanctum in the first precinct. There are inscriptions on the walls around the assembly and the prayer hall. There are three temple tanks associated with the temple. Kalyana Pushakarani is the principal temple tank located right opposite to the temple in the end of the street and visible from East Coast Road (ECR). Varaha Pushkarani is located near the northern compound wall of the temple, while Ranganatha Tirtham is located North-east to the temple. Punnai tree, which is usually associated with Shiva temples, is the sacred tree associated with the temple.

== Religious importance ==
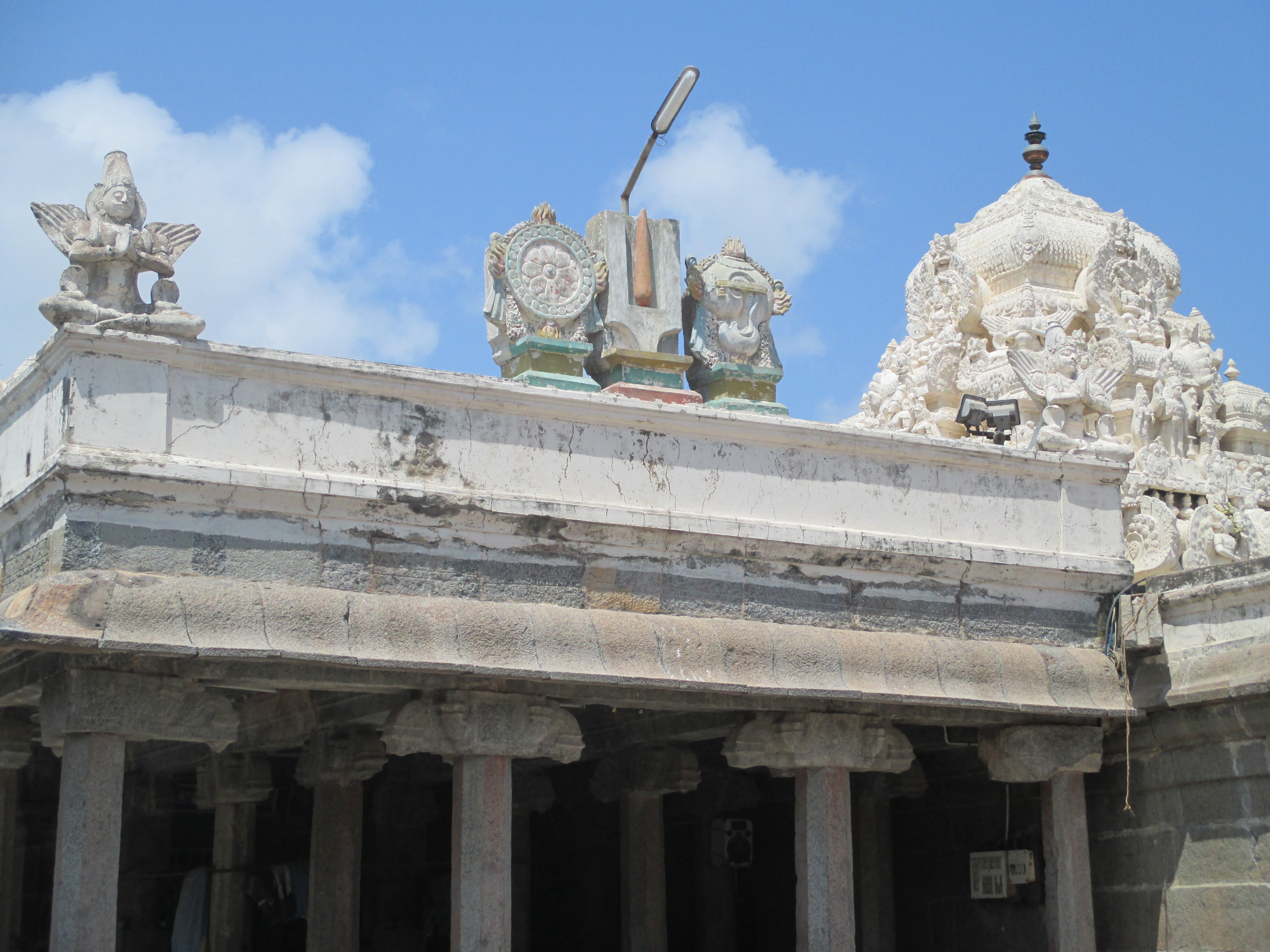
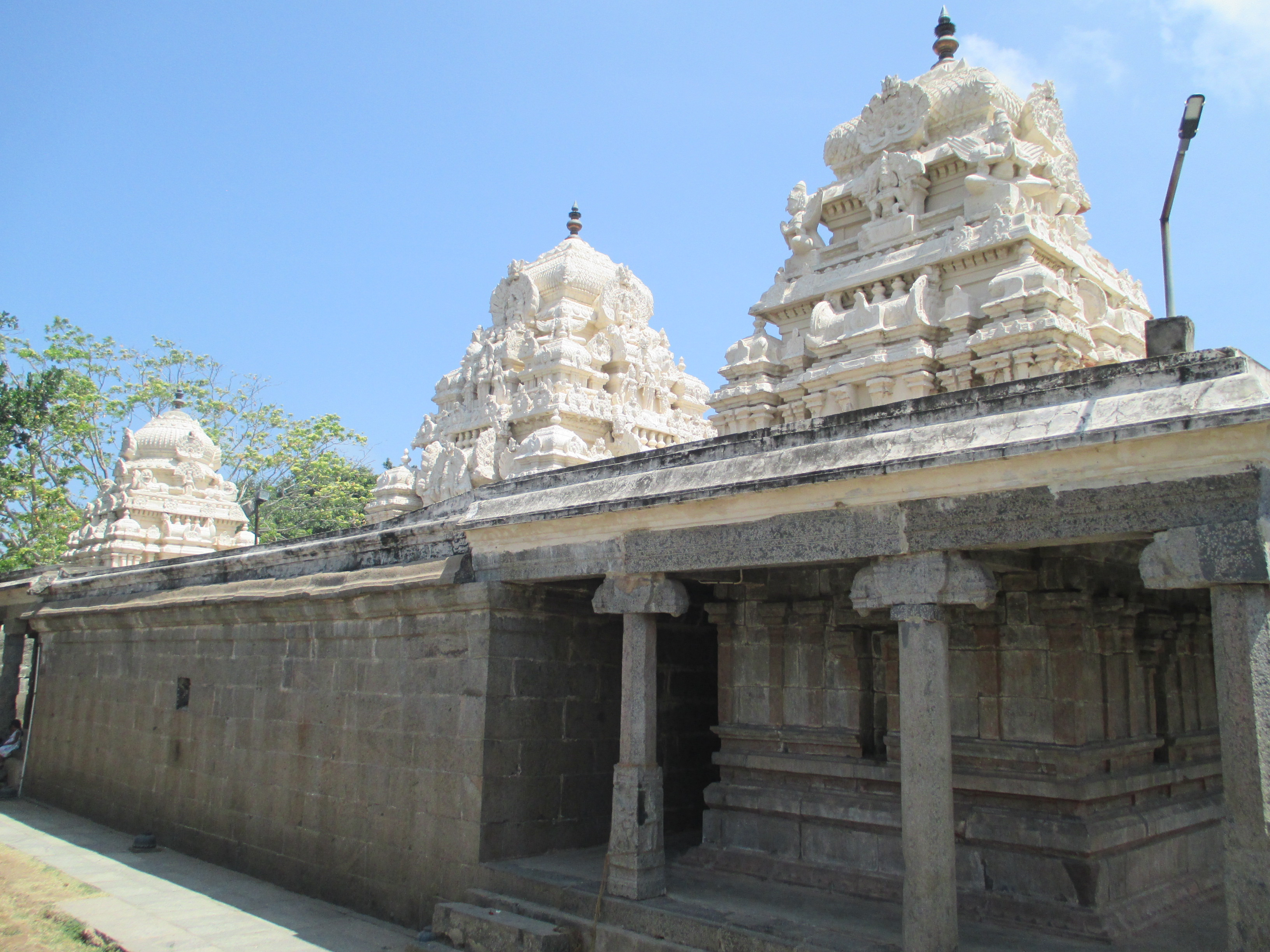
Images of shrines in the temple

Nithyakalayana Perumal temple is revered in Naalayira Divya Prabhandam, the 7th–9th century Vaishnava canon, by Thirumangai Alvar. The temple is classified as a Divya Desam, one of the 108 Vishnu temples that are mentioned in the book. Thirumangai Alvar has glorified the powers of Komalavalli Thayar. The temple also finds mention in later works by Nathamuni, Thirukachi Nambi, Ramanuja and Manavala Mamunigal. During the 18th and 19th centuries, the temple finds mention in several works like 108 Tirupathi Anthathi by Divya Kavi Pillai Perumal Aiyangar. Following the legend of Nithyakalyana Perumal, where Vishnu is believed to marry daily, the temple is frequented by people seeking marriage or whose marriage is delayed. A common worship practice is to offer garlands to the presiding deity, wearing it and circumambulating the temple nine times. Ranganatha, the reclining form of Vishnu, is believed to have attended the first wedding and after finding that there is a marriage every day, he set his abode in the temple. The presiding deity is addressed by various names like Varaha Deva, Alvar Varaha Deva, Vara Swami and Varaha Nayanar as seen from the inscriptions on the walls of the temple.

== Worship practices and festivals ==
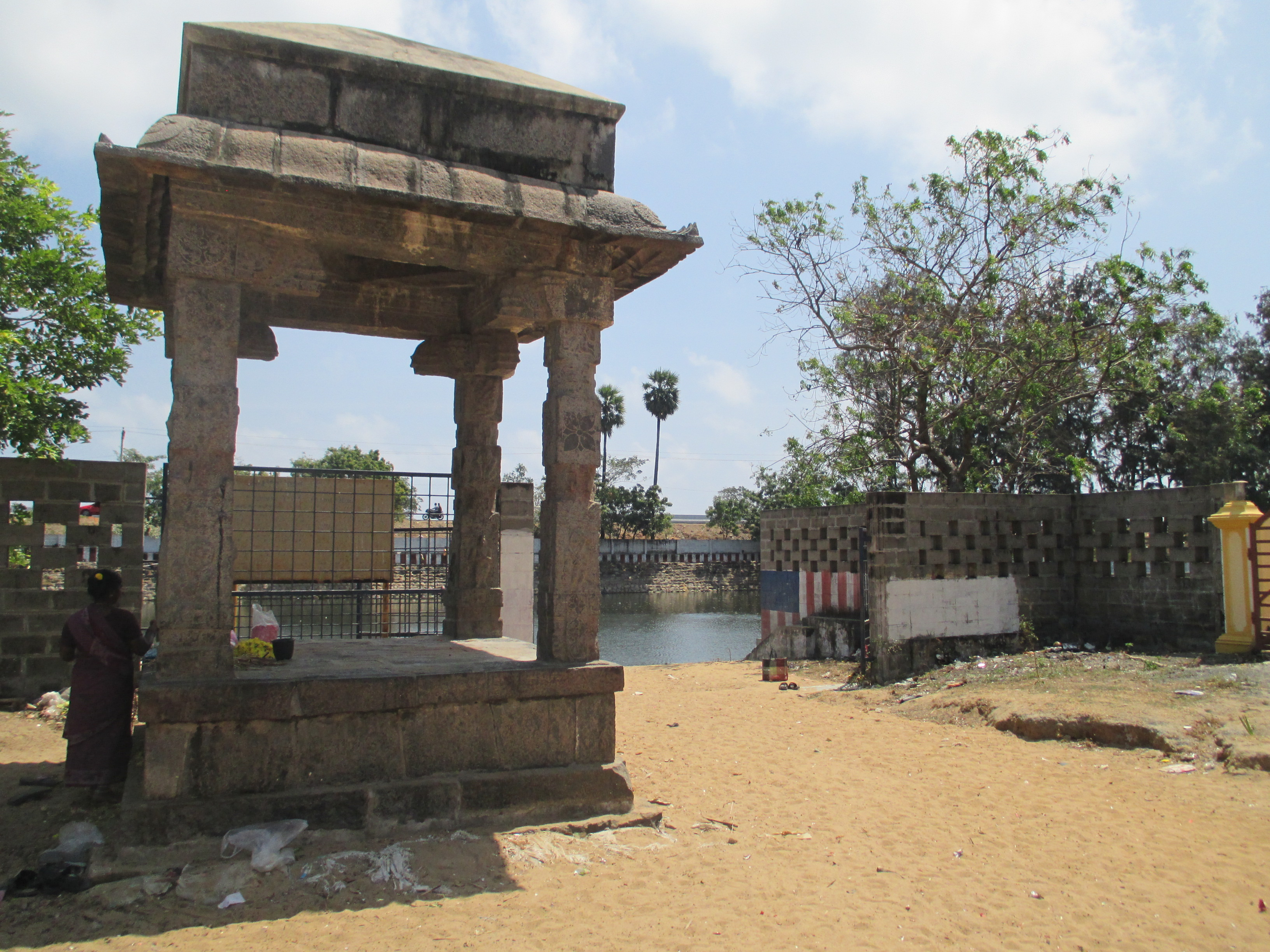
A four pillared hall and the temple tank, Kalayana Theertham

Though the temple is an archaeological site, the temple is active in worship practices. The temple follows Tenkalai tradition of worship based on Vaikasana Agamic tradition. The temple is open from 6:30 a.m. to 12 p.m. and 3:00 p.m. to 9:00 p.m. The temple priests perform the pooja (rituals) during festivals and on a daily basis. The temple rituals are performed four times a day: Ushathkalam at 8 a.m., Kalasanthi at 10:00 a.m., Sayarakshai at 5:00 p.m. and Ardha Jamam at 8:00 p.m. Each ritual has three steps: alangaram (decoration), neivethanam (food offering) and deepa aradanai (waving of lamps) for both Nithyakalyana Perumal and his consort Komalavalli. There are weekly, monthly and fortnightly rituals performed in the temple. Various festivals are celebrated in the temple, with the Chittirai Brahmotsavam during the Tamil of Chittirai (during April–May), and Vaikuntha Ekadashi during Margazhi (December–January) being the most prominent. During Brahmotsavam festival, the festival deities of Nithyakalyana Perumal and Komalavalli is taken in procession around the streets of the temple. Thirumangai Alvar Utsavam is celebrated during the star of Kiruthikai during November–December. The temple is maintained and administered by the Hindu Religious and Endowment Board of the Government of Tamil Nadu. The temple is one of the most visited tourist destination in the Chennai–Mahabalipuram region.

== See also ==
- Religion in Chennai
- Heritage structures in Chennai
