= Descent of the Ganges (Mahabalipuram) =

UNESCO World Heritage Site
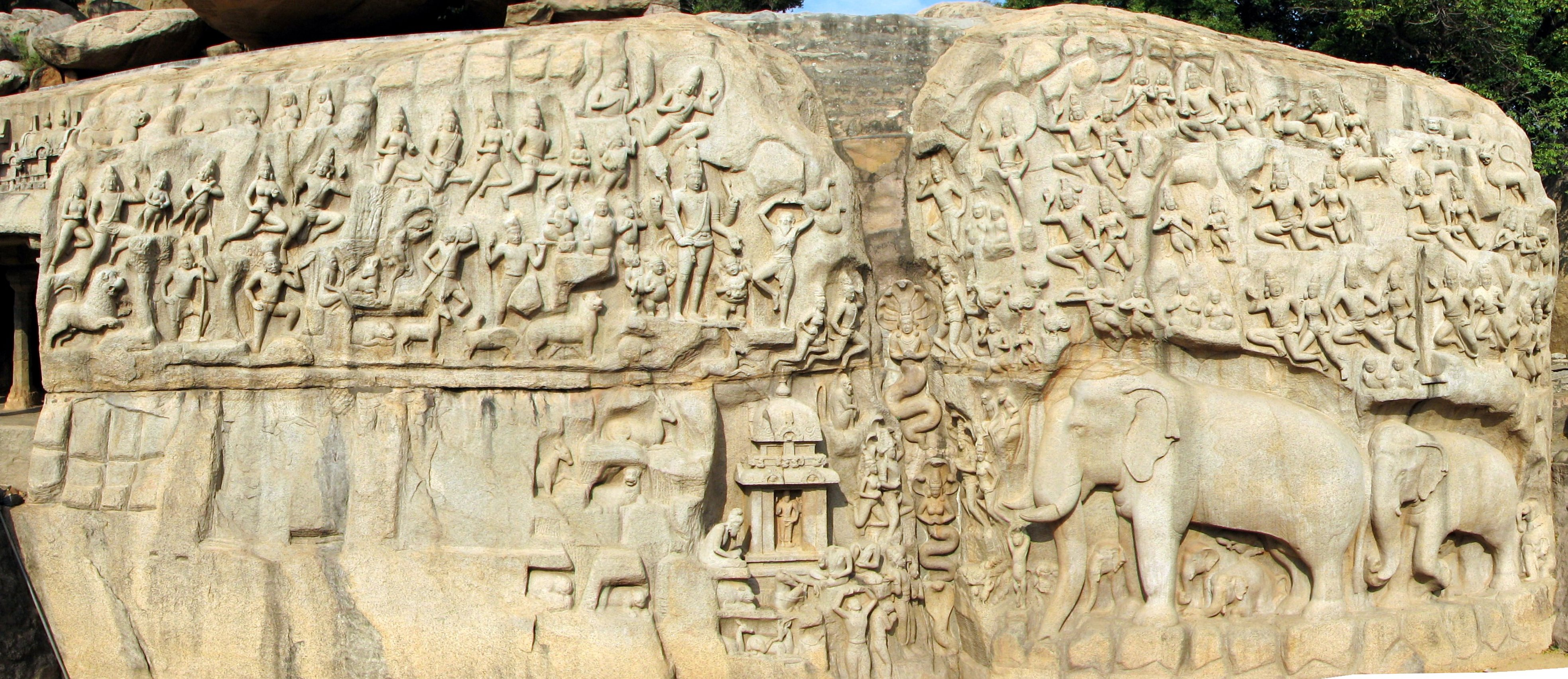

- Location within Tamil Nadu Location within India
- Location: Mahabalipuram, Chengalpattu district, Tamil Nadu, India
- Part of: Main complex of Group of Monuments at Mahabalipuram
- Criteria: Cultural: (i), (ii), (iii), (vi)
- Reference: 249-001
- Inscription: 1984 (8th Session)
- Coordinates: 12°37′03″N 80°11′56″E

Descent of the Ganges, known locally as Arjuna's Penance, is a monument at Mamallapuram, on the Coromandel Coast of the Bay of Bengal, in the Chengalpattu district of the state of Tamil Nadu, India. Measuring 96 by 43 feet (29 m × 13 m), it is a giant open-air rock relief carved on two monolithic rock boulders. The legend depicted in the relief is the story of the descent of the sacred river Ganges to earth from the heavens led by Bhagiratha. The waters of the Ganges are believed to possess supernatural powers. The descent of the Ganges and Arjuna's Penance are portrayed in stone at the Pallava heritage site. The relief is more of a canvas of Indian rock cut sculpture at its best not seen anywhere else in India. It is one of the Group of Monuments at Mamallapuram that was designated as a UNESCO World Heritage Site since 1984.

== Geography ==
The Arjuna relief is in the centre of Mahabalipuram, facing the sea at a short distance from the shores of the Coromandel Coast of the Bay of Bengal where the Shore Temple is situated. It is accessible from Chennai city over a 36 miles (58 km) paved road to its west and 20 miles (32 km) from Chengalpet.

== History ==
The relief was created to celebrate the victory of Narasimhavarman I over the Chalukya Emperor Pulakesin II. The place, now known as Mamallapuram, was named in honor of the Pallava monarch Narasimhavarman I (630–668 CE), who was conferred the title Mamallan, the "great wrestler" or "great warrior". He was the son of King Mahendravarman I. The architectural creations at Mamallapuram, mostly attributed to Mamallan in the 7th century, adopted stone as the medium for sculpting in situ rock faces, which until this was done with some perishable material like wood or loose stones. It is part of 25 UNESCO World Heritage Cultural Sites in India, and as a protected monument, the Archaeological Survey of India (ASI), Chennai Circle is entrusted with its upkeep in all aspects. The open air reliefs (including the Descent of the Ganges (Mamallapuram) are one of the four categories under which UNESCO identified the site as a World Heritage Site and inscribed it in 1984 under the title Group of Monuments at Mahabalipuram. This relief in rock is reported as a "sublime" early sculpture of the 7th century; even in the subsequent reign of the Imperial Cholas, they adopted the shrine-sculpting technique in the temples they built in the late 9th century. This architectural legacy of the Pallavas is continued by the descendants of sculptors of that period, who are now integrated into the present town's culture.

== Layout ==
The relief faces east. It was created on two large boulders of pink granite in the open air giving the whole a natural effect. The boulders measure 15 by 30 metres (49 ft × 98 ft). Many of the figures carved are life size. The natural cleft, a very large perpendicular fissure, is skillfully sculptured. It is between the two boulders and is integral to the mythical narratives carved on the entire relief. A water tank was once located at the top of the rock to release water denoting the Ganges River. It cascaded over the cleft and the relief to give the impression of the Ganga descending from the head tied dreads of Shiva. This scene was created during festive occasions and the presence of a brick masonry cistern at the top of the cleft to release water attests to its location at the site. The relief is an ensemble of over a hundred figures (146 is also mentioned) of gods, people, half-humans and animals.

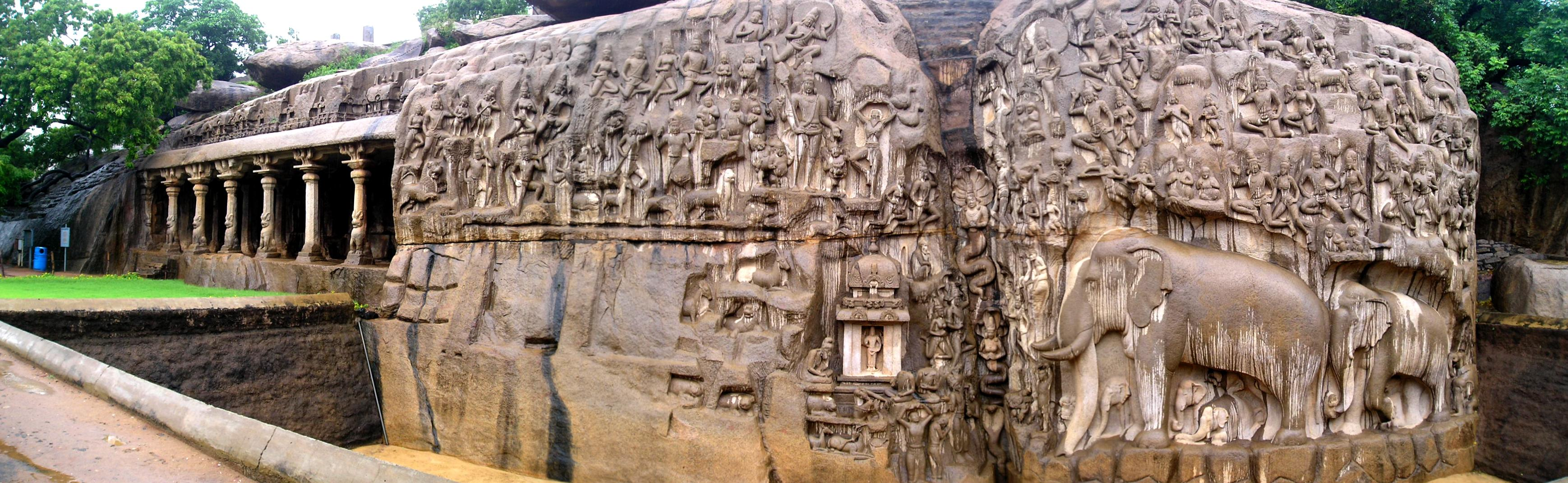
Panoramic view of the Descent of the Ganges relief

== Subject ==
The right side of the relief with foreign tourists and a guard, 1961

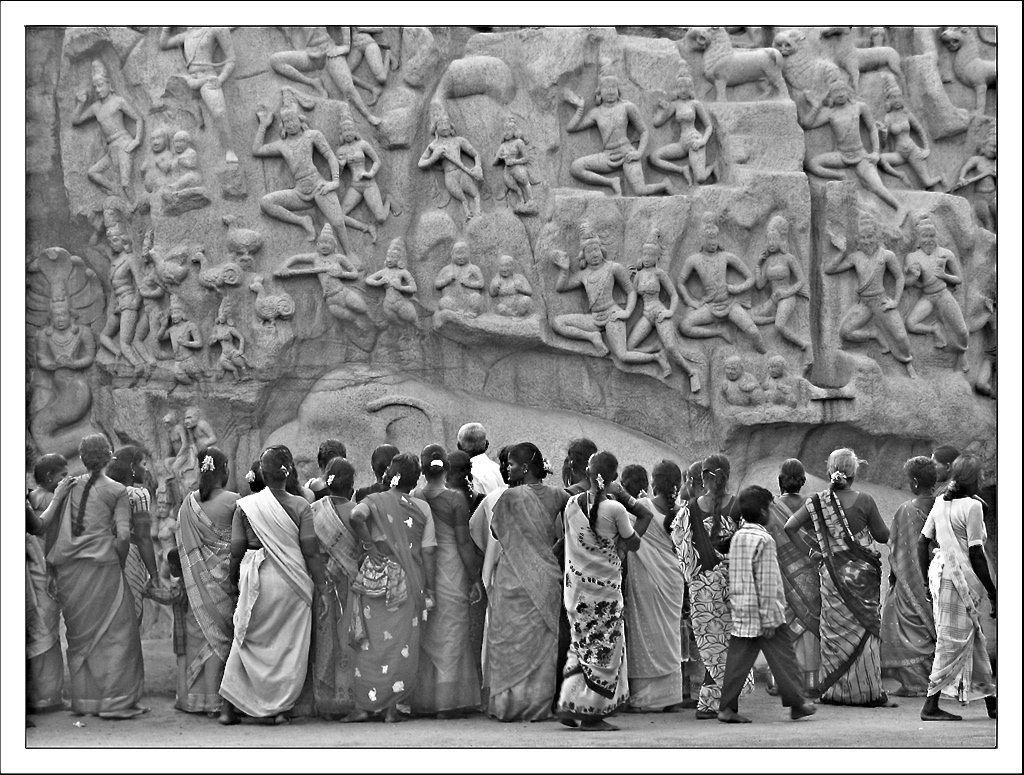
The panel of carvings viewed by women

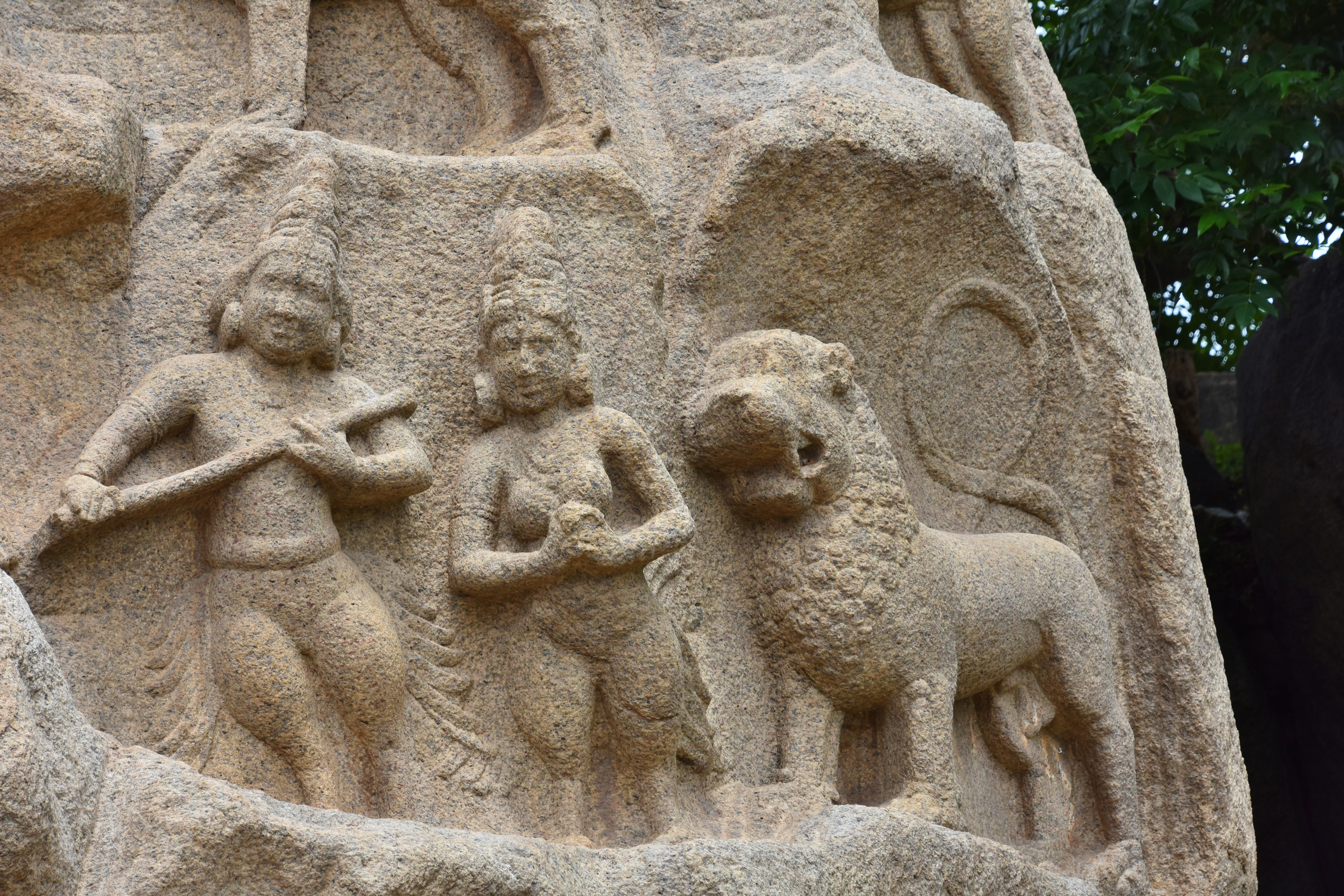
Detail from the left side showing kinnaras playing alapini vina and chime cymbals

The sculptures carved in the natural fissure that divides the cliff not only depict the cosmic event of Ganges descending to Earth but also show the event being watched by many gods, goddesses, puranic figurines such as Kinnara, Gandharva, Apsara, Gana, Nagas, and also wild and domestic animals. The total number of carvings are probably about 146. The carvings of elephants are almost life size. Another humorous scene is the carvings of monkeys copying the yogic scenes of the sages. Shiva is shown next to the Kinnaras who are depicted in large numbers in the upper portion of the relief; they are anthropomorphic forms of half-human half-bird, a popular Indian art form in ancient times representing the Indic ethos of the world as one creation. The male Kinnara is holding a musical instrument (Alapini vina) while the female Kinnara is holding a cymbal. Shiva is carved in front of the river (to the right of the cleft) in a standing posture with Bhagiratha, the sage, standing on one leg offering him prayers to check the force of the Ganga as she descends to earth. Shiva is also shown with a weapon which is interpreted as Pashupati, which he gave to Arjuna. The ganas shown in the carvings represent the people who have spent their entire lives in dedication to Shiva, and are blessed with the boon to remain close to Shiva for all time to come. Carvings of the divine nagas shown swimming in the river, as Ganga descends from the heavens, are also in anthropomorphic form of a serpent and human, which has been a traditional style from ancient times in Indic art. They are believed to denote fertility and protective forces of nature. They are seen not only in the middle of the panel facing the cleft, which represents the river, but also at the top of the panel at the entry of water over the channel, marking the prevalence of naga worship in Hindu religious beliefs.

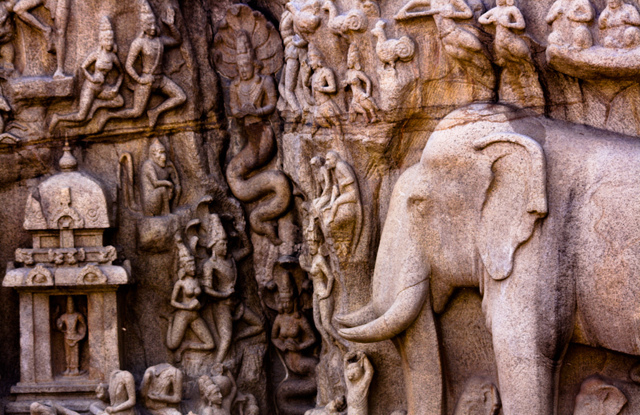
Detailing of sculptures showing the Vishnu temple to the right of the cleft

It is also said that the relief in one unity is the early Indic artist's concept of "sublime continuity in all living things". The elephants shown in reliefs are unique in the fact that the detailing includes the baby elephants behind the life-size elephants. Another interesting depiction is of a deer scratching its nose. The elephants represent a herd moving towards the river to drink water. The male elephant carving precedes that of its female partner. Three baby elephants with the male elephant and two babies with the female elephant are also carved in the panel.

Sun, on the left and Moon on the right side are also depicted on the top part of the panel. A kim-purusha, meaning a dwarf with elongated ears and wearing a cap on his head and beating a drum is also seen in the panel.

In the upper part of the panel, Himalayas are shown which corroborates the theory of the panel representing the descent of the Ganges. Wild lions are also shown with large mane and also rams which are interpreted as representing the Himalayan habitat. On the left side of the upper panel, carvings of divinities and celestial couples moving towards the river are seen. A few animals, lions and monkeys are also carved in this part. Two pairs of Kinnaras and three pairs of celestial couples are shown flying in the air approaching the river (cleft). Hunters and hunting scenes are part of this part of the panel; a hunter with a bow, two hunters hiding under trees to hunt, a lion about to attack two hunters are some of the parts of forest scenes carved on the panel. Another scene below is of a few monkeys, and a carving of a lion in his den with a few deer in front of it. Carvings of hunters carrying a pitcher and another carrying the hunted animals are also seen.

Another prominent scene is that of a temple to the right of the cleft at the lower end of the panel. This temple is simple and small and has Vishnu as the deity carved within it. The temple roof is patterned on the style of Draupadi Ratha with a square curvilinear dome type of tower. However, the top is flat and is fitted with a stupi, with a kudu in the centre. Corners are decorated with flower designs. The cornices are also seen with kudus carved with human faces inside. In the floor above the cornice, lion motifs are carved. A square supports the domed roof. A sage is seen sitting in front of the temple giving sermons to his students. In the seat below this scene, a lion in his den and below this a pair of deer are carved. A tortoise is shown next to the temple indicative of water in the near vicinity.

== Interpretations ==
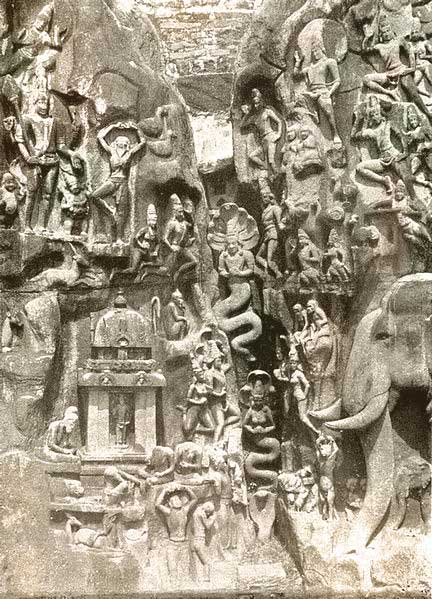
Relief detail

In one interpretation, a figure in the relief who is standing on one leg is said to be Arjuna performing an austerity Tapas to receive a boon from Shiva as an aid in fighting the Mahabharata War. The story of the penance is narrated in the epic Mahabharata under the subtitle the Kiratarjuniya. The boon, which Arjuna is said to have received, was called Pasupata, Shiva's most powerful weapon. In this event, asuras (demons) sent a boar to kill Arjuna. Then Shiva appeared on the scene to protect Arjuna assuming the form of kirata (hunter). Both Arjuna and Shiva shot arrows at the boar and the boar was killed; both claimed credit for slaying it and a fight ensued between the two in which Shiva won. He then revealed his true self to Arjuna and blessed him and gave him the weapon for which Arjuna is shown performing the penance.

The relief is carved on two large boulders with a cleft. Above the cleft was a collecting pool, and at one time, water may have flowed along the cleft. Figures in the cleft in the rock are covered with nagas (serpent deities), in anjali posture. The river is said to represent Ganga or the River Ganges emerging from Shiva's head. This provides the basis for an alternative interpretation of the mural. Rather than Arjuna, the figure performing austerities is said to be Bhagiratha. Bhagiratha is said to have performed austerities so that Ganga might descend to earth and wash over the ashes of his relatives, releasing them from their sins. To break Ganga's fall from heaven to earth, she falls onto Shiva's hair, and is divided into many streams by his tresses; this miraculous event is shown in the form of sculptures on the boulders being watched by the animals and human beings.

Another interpretation for the yogi doing penance on one leg is that it is a depiction of Bhagiratha doing severe penance to bring down the Ganges to earth to usher prosperity and happiness to the people. The nagas carved in the cleft represent fecundity and wealth. Shiva and other gods are shown blessing the saint. The scene is further accentuated with carvings of kings, sages, artists and animals.

One more interpretation of the events seen in another part of the panel is that of a cat standing on one leg (apparently as an austerity), and perhaps an iconic figure in the relief. It is interpreted as relating to the Panchatantra story of an ascetic. It denotes the hare luring a bird to come close so that she could she catch and devour it. The artist has brought out the expression on the cat's face, its motives clearly visible.

== See also ==
- Varaha Cave Temple
- Shore Temple
- Pancha Rathas
- Group of Monuments at Mahabalipuram
