= Thiruvidandai =

Suburban village in South Chennai

Thiruvidandai is a suburban village located in South Chennai, about 19 kilometres (12 miles) south of Thiruvanmiyur, and 4 kilometres (2.5 miles) distant from Covelong on the East Coast Road in the Indian state of Tamil Nadu. The village derives its name from the Nithyakalyana Perumal temple and its history is centered on the temple.

== History ==
The temple was built by Pallavas. The history of this temple dates back more than 2000 years. It is near the Bay of Bengal seashore. A large temple tank is in front of the temple. This is known as the Kalyana Theertham. There is a separate shrine for Komalavalli Nachiyar. Perumal appears majestically in His standing form facing east. The Vimana above the sanctum sanctorum is called Kalyana Vimanam. The Lord here stands on Adisesha and his consort on his left thigh. There is also separate shrine for Andal. The Temple follows Thenkalai Sampradayam.

== Legend ==
During Treta Yuga, Bali was ruling the kingdom of the three worlds in a righteous way. The demons Mali, Sumali and others sought the help of Bali to fight against the devas. Bali simply declined to help them. The demons fought alone were defeated by the Devas. They came again to Bali for help which he obliged this time. Bali won the war but was afflicted with the Sin of Fighting the Devas without a just cause. He came to this place for relief and performed penance to the Lord. Pleased with his penance, Perumal appeared before Bali and granted darshan in Varaha Rupa.

Sage Kuni and his daughter performed penance to Lord Narayana to reach Svarga or heaven. Kuni alone reached but not the daughter. Maharshi Narada told the young girl that she could not reach Svarga as she was not married. He requested other sages to marry her. Kalava Maharshi married her and had 360 girl children. He performed penance to Lord Narayana begging Him to marry his daughters. Narayana did not come. A Brahmachari, an unmarried youth came one day there saying that he was on a pilgrimage. As he was very handsome as Narayana, the sage requested him to marry his daughters. He agreed and married one each day, on the 360 days of the Hindu Calendar. On the last day, He showed who he really was. He was none but Narayana in the form of Varaha. The Lord the merged all the 360 daughters into Akilavalli Thayar who is seated in the left lap of Varaha Swamy. As Perumal seated Akilavalli in His Left Lap The place was originally known as Tiruvidavandhai which later changed as Tiruvidandhai.
