= Varaha Cave Temple =

UNESCO World Heritage Site
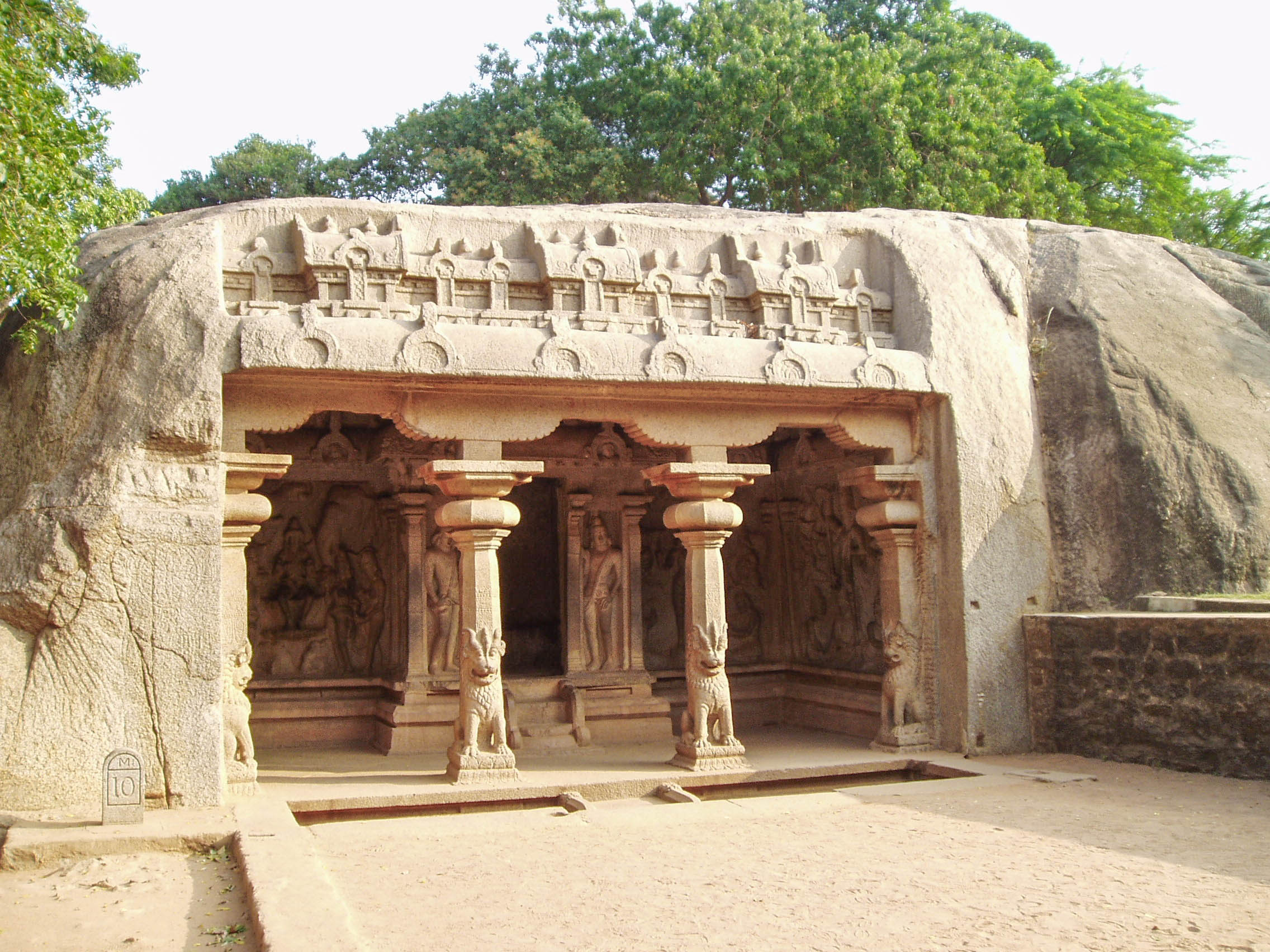
- Interactive map of Varaha Cave Temple
- Location: Mamallapuram, Kanchipuram district, Tamil Nadu, India
- Part of: Main complex of Group of Monuments at Mahabalipuram
- Criteria: Cultural: (i), (ii), (iii), (vi)
- Reference: 249-001
- Inscription: 1984 (8th Session)
- Coordinates: 12°37′03″N 80°11′56″E

Varaha Cave Temple (i.e., Varaha Mandapa or the Adivaraha Cave) is a rock-cut cave temple located at Mamallapuram, on the Coromandel Coast of the Bay of Bengal in Kancheepuram District in Tamil Nadu, India. It is part of the hill top village, which is 4 kilometres (2.5 mi) to the north of the main Mahabalipurm sites of rathas and the Shore Temple. It is an example of Indian rock-cut architecture dating from the late 7th century. The temple is one of the finest testimonial to the ancient Hindu rock-cut cave architecture, out of many such caves also called mandapas. Part of the Group of Monuments at Mahabalipuram, the temple is a UNESCO World Heritage Site as inscribed in 1984 under criteria i, ii, iii and iv. The most prominent sculpture in the cave is that of the Hindu god Vishnu in the incarnated form of a Varaha or boar lifting Bhudevi, the mother earth goddess from the sea. Also carved are many mythical figures.

== Geography ==
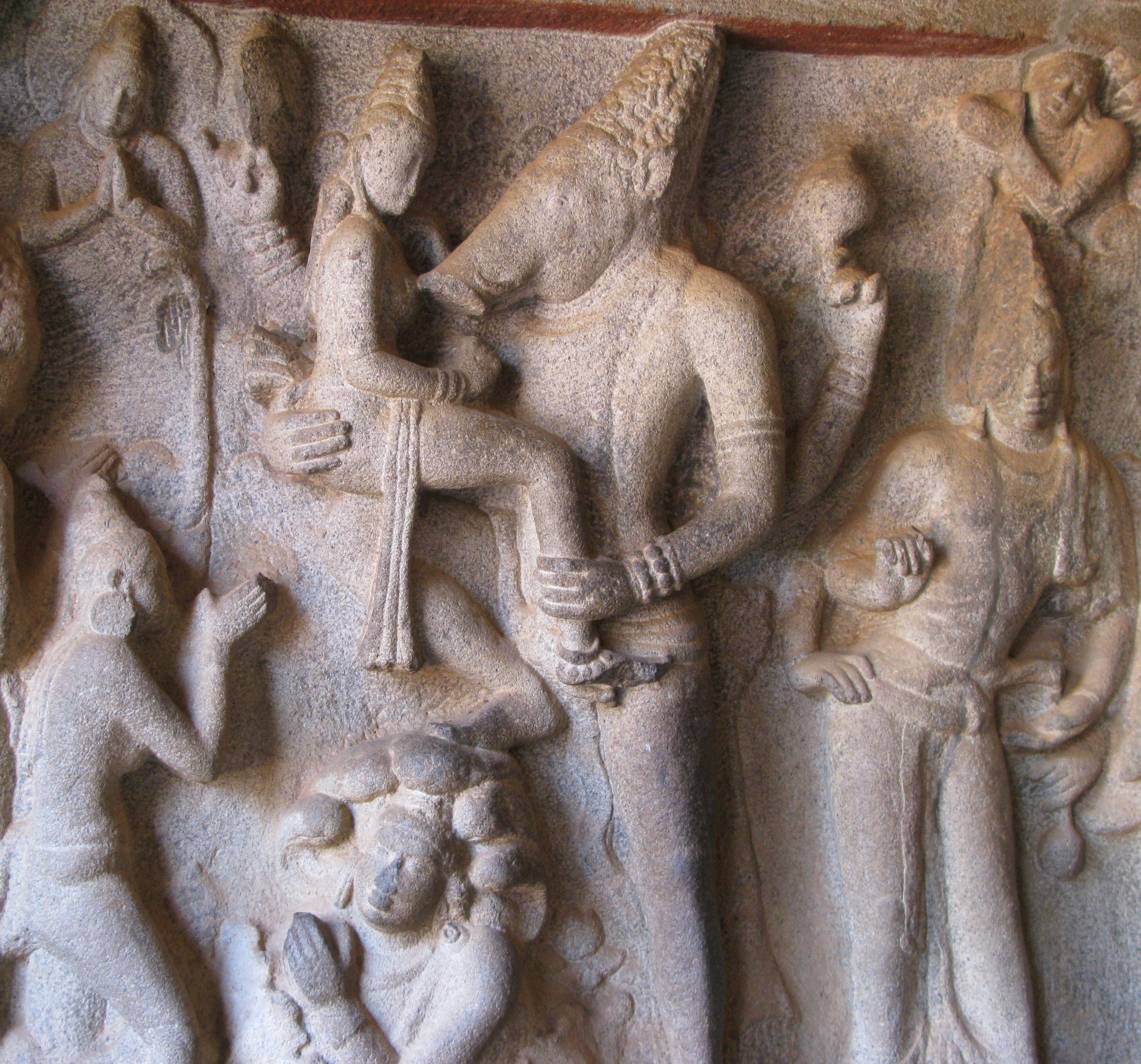
The relief of Vishnu as Varaha lifting Bhudevi, the earth

Varaha Cave Temple is located on the hills of Mahabalipuram town, 4 kilometres (2.5 mi) to the north of the main Mahabalipurm sites of rathas and Shore Temple, on the Coromandel Coast of the Bay of Bengal of the Indian Ocean. Now in the Kanchipuram district, it is approximately 58 kilometres (36 mi) from Chennai city (previously Madras) and about 20 miles (32 km) from Chengalpattu.

== History ==
The cave reflects a transitional style of architecture in its columns mounted on seated lions and frescoes carved on the walls inside the cave which evolved during the rule of Pallava kings Mahendra Varman I and Narasimhavarman I known as Mamalla. This style was continued by Mamalla's son Parameshvaravarman I. Historical research has also confirmed that Mahabalipuram town came to be established only after it was named after Mamalla and the caves and rathas are all attributed to his reign during the year 650 AD. It is the earliest known monument in Mahabalipuram though not the most visited due its hidden location. The distinctive feature of the Pallava style is that the frontage of the cave has, without exception, finely carved columns mounted on lions in a sitting posture. The structure is part of the Group of Monuments at Mahabalipuram, a UNESCO World Heritage Site inscribed in 1984.

== Architecture ==
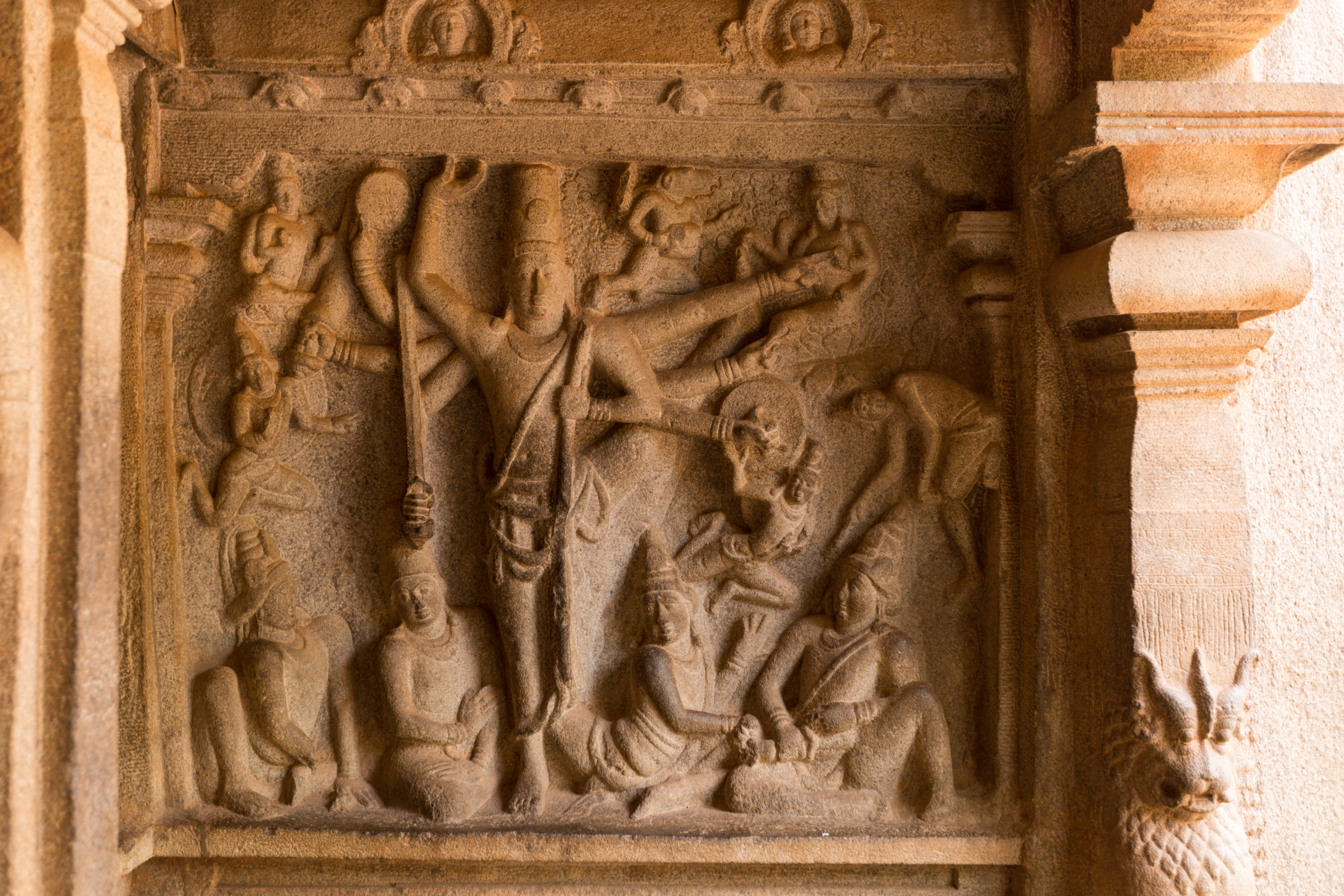
Vishnu as Trivikrama taking the three strides

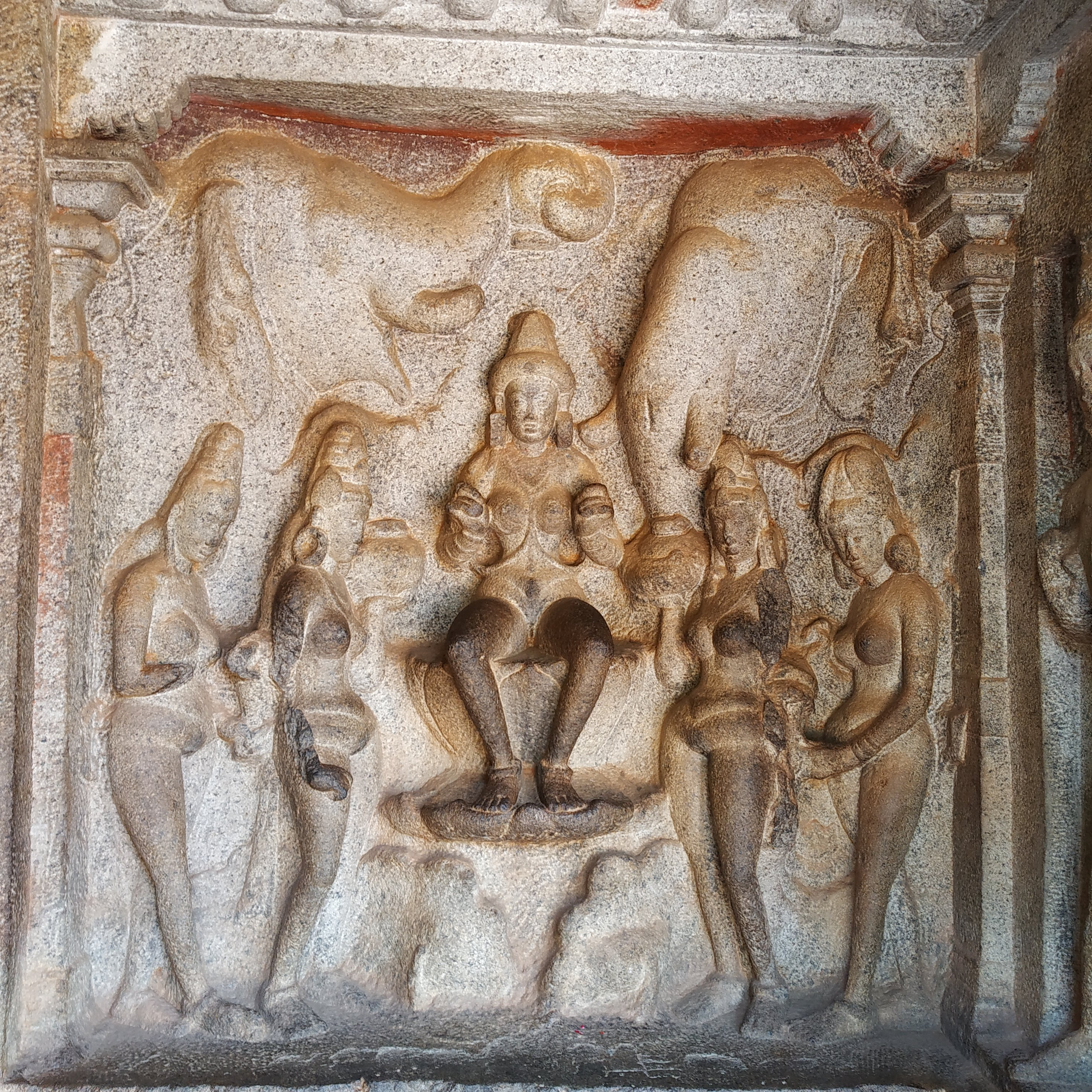
Gajalakshmi panel.

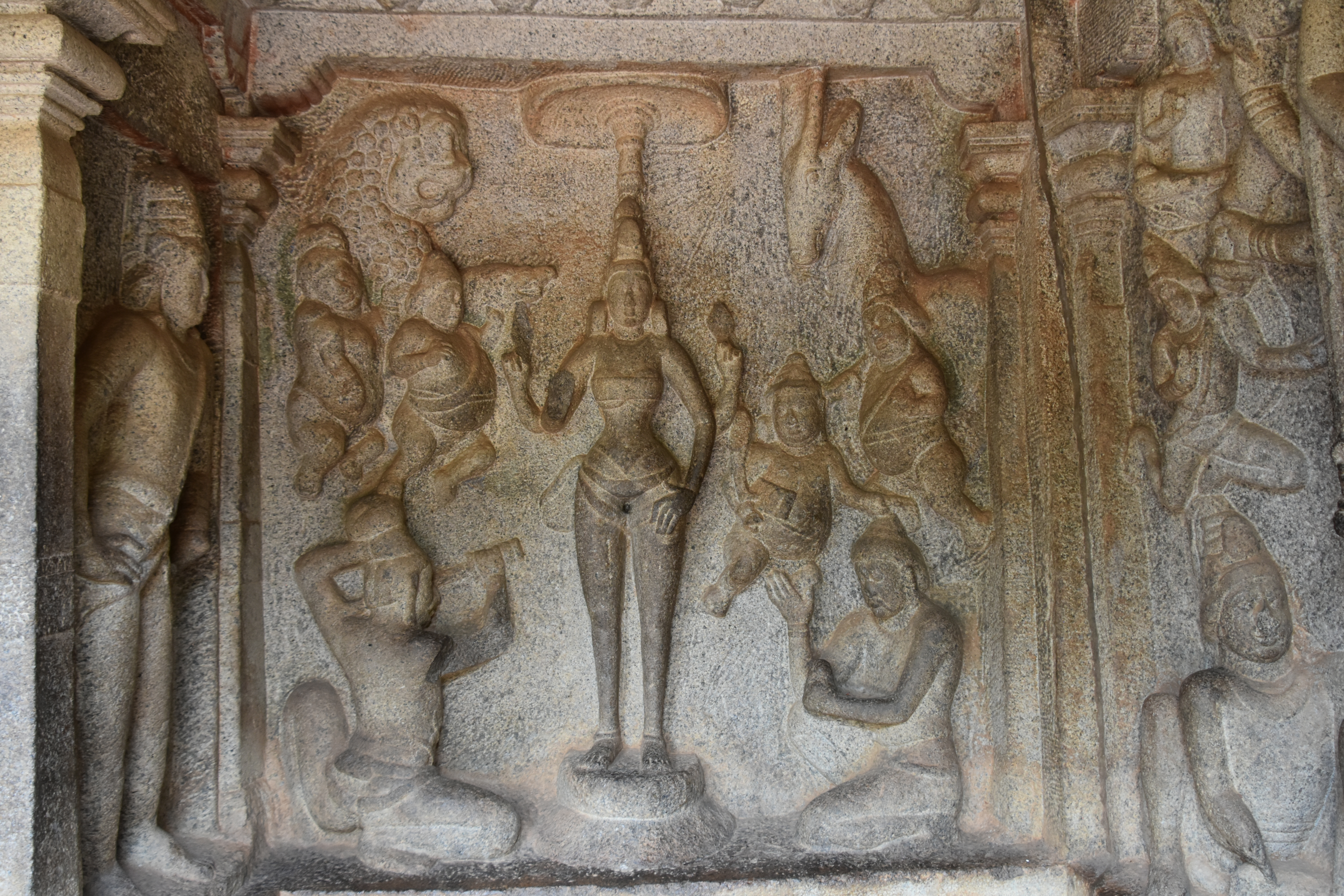
Durga Panel.

=== Layout ===
The temple is a small monolithic rock-cut temple with a mandapa carved into the rock face of pink granite formations, dating from the 7th century. The cave is of smaller dimension and has a simple plan. The fluted columns separating the openings have cushion-shaped capitals and seated lions at the base. Certain Greco-Roman architectural styles could also be discerned and the sitting statues are said to have likeness to the sitting styles seen in European architecture, as against the Indian cross legged style. The style thus created at Mahabalipuram became a forerunner for South Indian style of architecture. The walls inside the cave have several striking mythological scenes carved in relief. Vishnu rescuing the earth, Vishnu taking three strides, Gaja Laksmi and Durga are all impressive panels carved in the Adivaraha Cave.

=== Features ===
At the centre of the rear wall of the mandapa, opposite to the entrance, guardian figures are carved on either side of a shrine. Inside the mandapa, the walls have four large sculptured panels, good examples of naturalistic Pallava art. The side walls have carved sculpture panels of Vishnu as Trivikrama (Vamana) and northern panel, which is very large, depicts Vishnu in the form of Varaha, the boar, lifting Bhudevi, the earth goddess symbolically representing removal of ignorance of human beings. In this panel, Varaha has four hands, two arms carrying shankha and chakra, which are shown towards the back and in one of the arms in the front he is carrying Bhudevi. There are no attendants fawning on him. However, the original panel has been plastered and painted.

The Gajalakshmi panel is on the rear wall which represents Gajalakshmi, an aspect of Lakshmi - the goddess of prosperity. The religious significance of Gajalakshmi is well brought out in the panel. She is shown with her hand holding lotus flowers, fawned by four attendants, and carved in "perfect beauty and gracious countenance". Two royal elephants are filling the water vessels held by the attendants and one elephant is pouring water from the vessel on Lakshmi and the other is about to take the vessel from the maiden's hand to pour water over Lakshmi. The Durga panel, also on the rear wall, is indicative of victory over ignorance. The Trivikrama panel depicts Vishnu as the Lord of the three worlds. Another strikingly impressive panel is of Durga slaying the demon Mahishasura who is in an anthropomorphic form of a human with a buffalo head; the scene is reminiscent of a battle between good and evil forces, with the side of Durga represented by the confident looking ganas advancing and the other side of Mahishasura with his army of asuras (demons) retreating. This scene is a new architectural depiction which is appreciated as to "enhance the drama and realism of the subject." The Brahma panel is carved with Brahma having three heads in sambhaga or standing posture.
