= Mamallapuram =

Satellite town of Chennai in Chengalpattu, Tamil Nadu, India

Mamallapuram Mahabalipuram
- Suburb of Chennai
- Mamallapuram
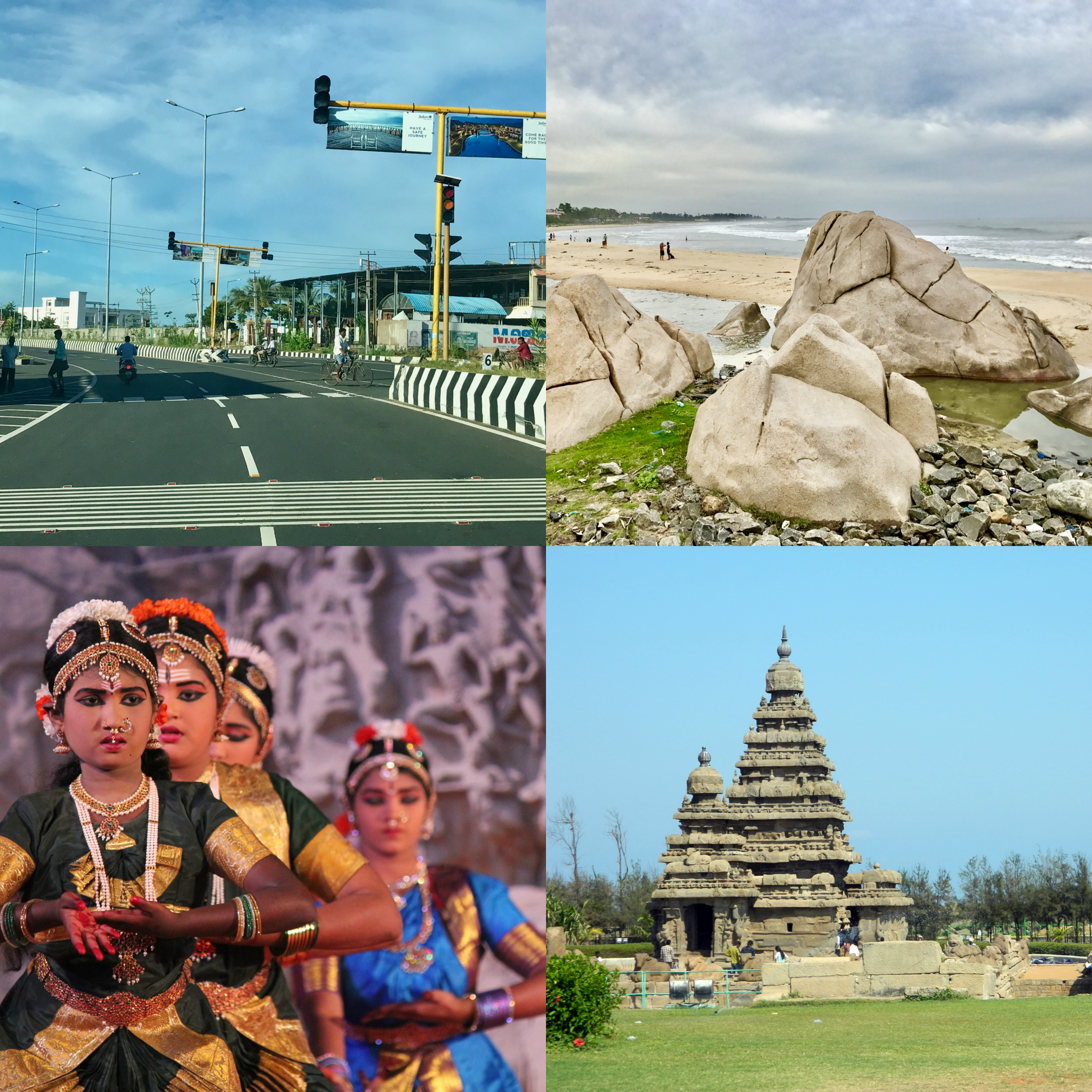
- The town of Mahabalipuram

- Location within Tamil Nadu
- Coordinates: 12°37′11″N 80°11′40″E
- Country: India
- State: Tamil Nadu
- District: Chengalpattu

Area
  - Total: 12.568 km^{2} (4.853 sq mi)
- Elevation: 12 m (39 ft)

Population (2011)
  - Total: 15,172
  - Density: 1,207.2/km^{2} (3,126.6/sq mi)

Languages
  - Official: Tamil
- Time zone: UTC+5:30 (IST)
- PIN: 603104
- Telephone code: 91–44
- Vehicle registration: TN-19

Mamallapuram (also known as Mahabalipuram) is a town in Chengalpattu district in the southeastern Indian state of Tamil Nadu, best known for the UNESCO World Heritage Site of 7th- and 8th-century Hindu Group of Monuments at Mahabalipuram. It is one of the famous tourist sites in India. The ancient name of the place is Thirukadalmallai. It is a part of Chennai Metropolitan Area. It is a satellite town of Chennai.

Mamallapuram was one of two major port cities in the Pallava kingdom. The town was named after Pallava king Narasimhavarman I, who was also known as Mamalla. Along with economic prosperity, it became the site of a group of royal monuments, many carved out of the living rock. These are dated to the 7th and 8th centuries: rathas (temples in the form of chariots), mandapas (cave sanctuaries), the giant open-air rock relief the Descent of the Ganges, and the Shore Temple dedicated to Shiva. The contemporary town plan was established by the British Raj in 1827.

== Etymology ==
The earliest mention of the city is found in the 1st century work called Periplus of the Erythraean Sea by an unknown Greek navigator. Ptolemy, the Greek geographer refers this place as Malange. Mahabalipuram is also known by other names such as Mamallapattana and Mamallapuram. The term Mamallapuram means the city of Mamalla, the other name of the famous Pallava Emperor Narasimhavarman I (630-670 CE) who built the famous temples in the city. Thirumangai Alvar, the famous Vaishnavite saint mentions this place as Thirukadalmallai, referring to the Sthalasayana Perumal Temple. Another name by which Mahabalipuram has been known to mariners, at least since Marco Polo's time is "Seven Pagodas" alluding to the Seven Pagodas of Mahabalipuram that stood on the shore, of which one, the Shore Temple, survives.

== History ==
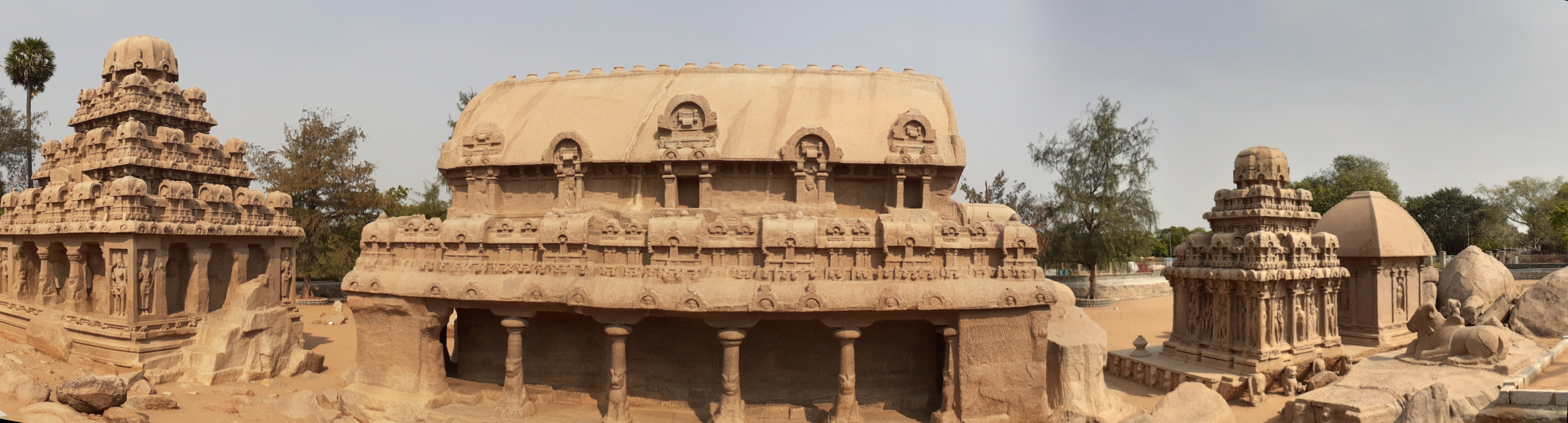
Panoramic view of Pancharatha temple

Neolithic burial urn, cairn circles and jars with burials dating to the 1st century BCE have been discovered near Mahabalipuram. The Sangam age poem Perumpāṇāṟṟuppadai relates the rule of King Thondaiman Ilam Thiraiyar at Kanchipuram of the Tondai Nadu port Nirppeyyaru which scholars identify with the present-day Mahabalipuram. Chinese coins and Roman coins of Theodosius I in the 4th century CE have been found at Mahabalipuram revealing the port as an active hub of global trade in the late classical period. Two Pallava coins bearing legends read as Srihari and Srinidhi have been found at Mahabalipuram. The Pallava kings ruled Mahabalipuram from Kanchipuram; the capital of the Pallava dynasty from the 3rd century to 9th century CE, and used the port to launch trade and diplomatic missions to Sri Lanka and Southeast Asia. An 8th-century Tamil text written by Thirumangai Alvar described this place as Sea Mountain 'where the ships rode at anchor bent to the point of breaking laden as they were with wealth, big trunked elephants and gems of nine varieties in heaps'.

The temples of Mahabalipuram, portraying events described in the Mahabharata, were built largely during the reigns of King Narasimhavarman and his successor Rajasimhavarman and show the movement from rock-cut architecture to structural building. The city of Mahabalipuram was founded by the Pallava king Narasimhavarman I in the 7th century CE. The mandapa or pavilions and the rathas or shrines shaped as temple chariots are hewn from the granite rock face, while the famed Shore Temple, erected half a century later, is built from dressed stone. What makes Mahabalipuram so culturally resonant are the influences it absorbs and disseminates. The Shore Temple includes many reliefs, including one 100 feet (30 m) long and 45 feet (14 m) high, carved out of granite.

Within the 6th − 8th centuries CE there were power struggles occurring in the region required resources to be pulled away from artistry in the Mamallapuram, which played both a distinct role in its development, while also affecting appropriation and erasure of previous history contained in the structure.

In 1957 the Government College of Architecture and Sculpture was established to promote and revive the art of making sculptures and temples.

== Transport ==
MTC and TNSTC (Villupuram division) operate bus services between Mamallapuram/Mahabalipuram and Chennai, Chengalpattu, Kancheepuram, Thiruttani etc. MTC's bus services available from various parts of the Chennai include Deluxe and Air-conditioned buses. Mahabalipuram is 56 km from Chennai.

== Climate ==
Mahabalipuram has a tropical wet and dry climate. The Köppen-Geiger climate classification is Aw. The average annual temperature is 28.4 °C. The temperatures are highest on average in May, at around 32.6 °C. In January, the average temperature is 24.3 °C, the lowest of the year. The average temperatures vary during the year by 8.3 °C. In a year, the average rainfall is 1219 mm. In winter, there is much less rainfall than in summer. The variation in the precipitation between the driest and wettest months is 309 mm.

Climate data for Mahabalipuram
Month	Jan	Feb	Mar	Apr	May	Jun	Jul	Aug	Sep	Oct	Nov	Dec	Year
Mean daily maximum °C (°F)	28.9 (84.0)	30.4 (86.7)	32.1 (89.8)	34.4 (93.9)	37.6 (99.7)	37.4 (99.3)	35.5 (95.9)	34.9 (94.8)	34.3 (93.7)	32.0 (89.6)	29.3 (84.7)	28.5 (83.3)	32.9 (91.3)
Daily mean °C (°F)	24.3 (75.7)	25.4 (77.7)	27.2 (81.0)	30.0 (86.0)	32.6 (90.7)	32.2 (90.0)	30.8 (87.4)	30.2 (86.4)	29.7 (85.5)	28.0 (82.4)	25.8 (78.4)	24.6 (76.3)	28.4 (83.1)
Mean daily minimum °C (°F)	19.8 (67.6)	20.4 (68.7)	22.4 (72.3)	25.6 (78.1)	27.6 (81.7)	27.1 (80.8)	26.2 (79.2)	25.5 (77.9)	25.1 (77.2)	24.1 (75.4)	22.4 (72.3)	20.8 (69.4)	23.9 (75.1)
Average precipitation mm (inches)	20 (0.8)	6 (0.2)	4 (0.2)	11 (0.4)	55 (2.2)	62 (2.4)	92 (3.6)	124 (4.9)	114 (4.5)	240 (9.4)	313 (12.3)	178 (7.0)	1,219 (47.9)
Average precipitation days	2	1	1	2	3	4	6	8	8	13	15	10	71
Source: Climate-data.org

== Landmarks ==
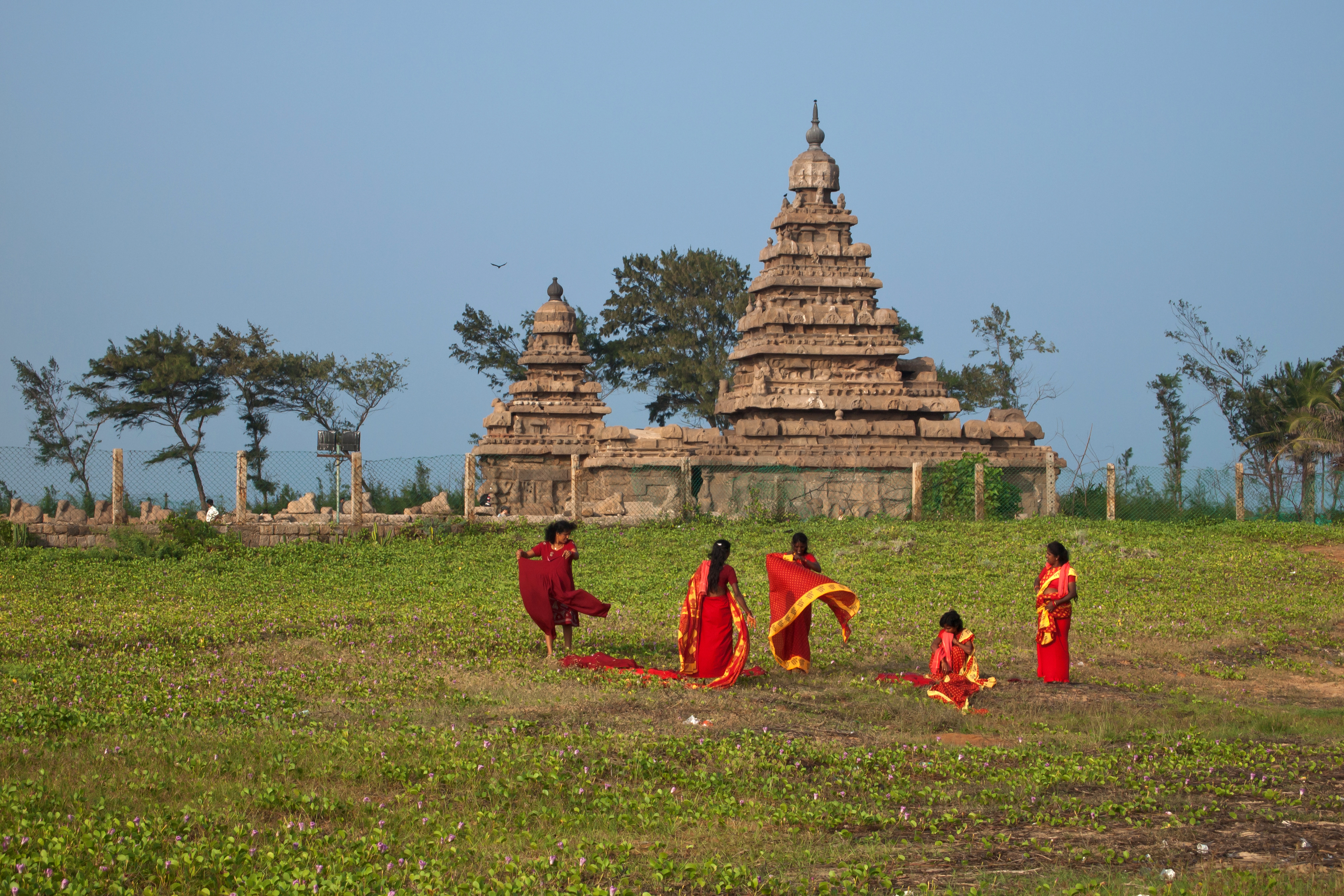
Shore Temple, the major monument in Mahabalipuram

The town has a collection of 7th- and 8th-century Hindu religious monuments that has been declared as a UNESCO World Heritage Site. It is on the Coromandel Coast of the Bay of Bengal, about 60 kilometres (37 mi) south of Chennai, Tamil Nadu, India.

The site has 40 ancient monuments and Hindu temples, including Descent of the Ganges or Arjuna's Penance – one of the largest open-air rock relief in the world. The site includes several categories of monuments: ratha temples with an architecture of monolith processional chariots built between 630 and 668 CE; the mandapa viharas with halls and stone roofs with narratives from the Mahabharata, Shaktism and Vaishnavism; rock reliefs particularly bas-reliefs of Shaivism, Shaktism and Vaishnavism; stone cut temples particularly those dedicated to Shiva that also reverentially display Vishnu and others, built between 695 and 722 CE; and, archaeological excavations with inscriptions some dated to 6th century and earlier. The cave temples and monolithic temples were built during the Pallava Period. The site is managed by the Archaeological Survey of India.

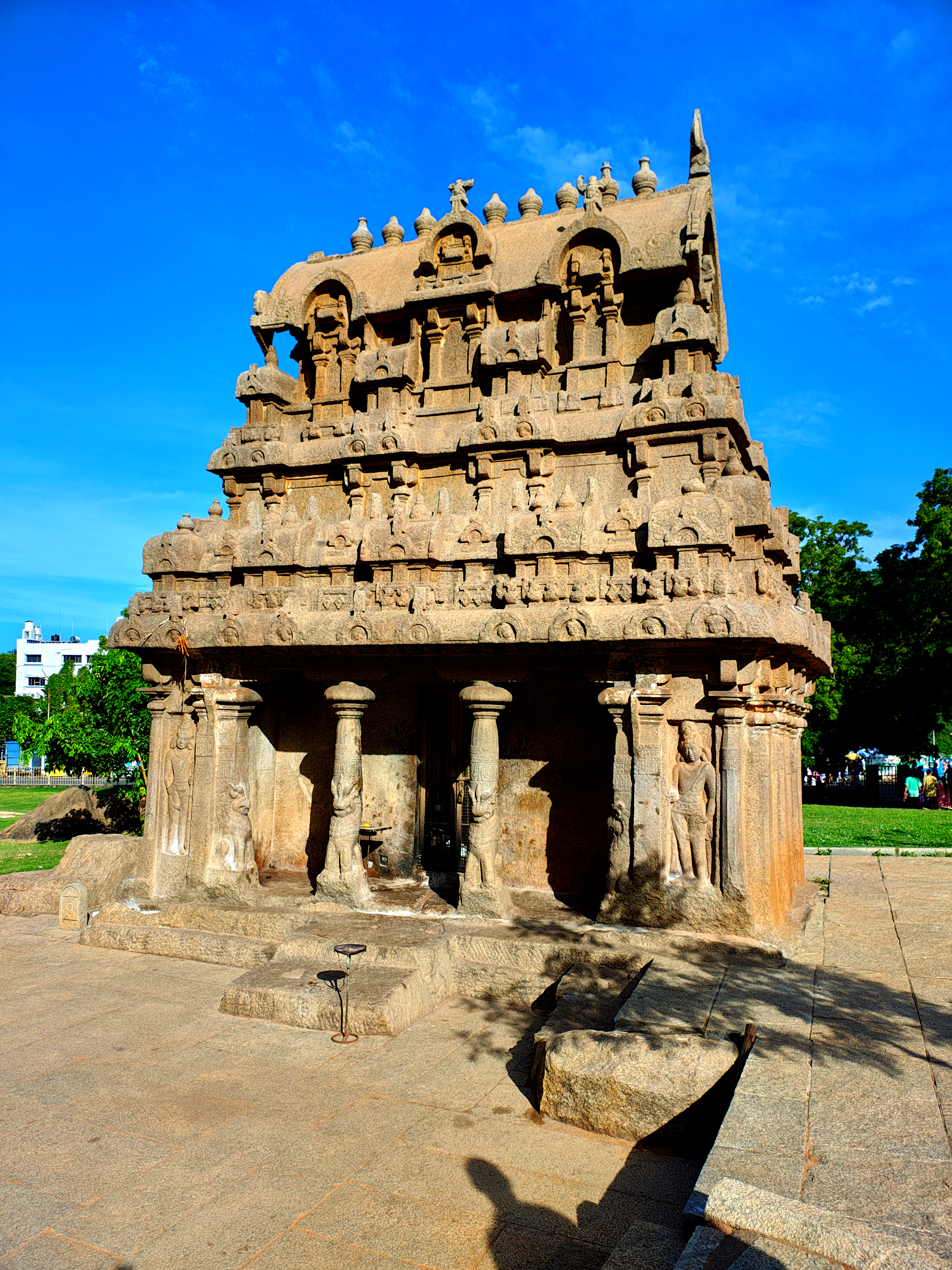
Ganesha Ratha, Mamallapuram

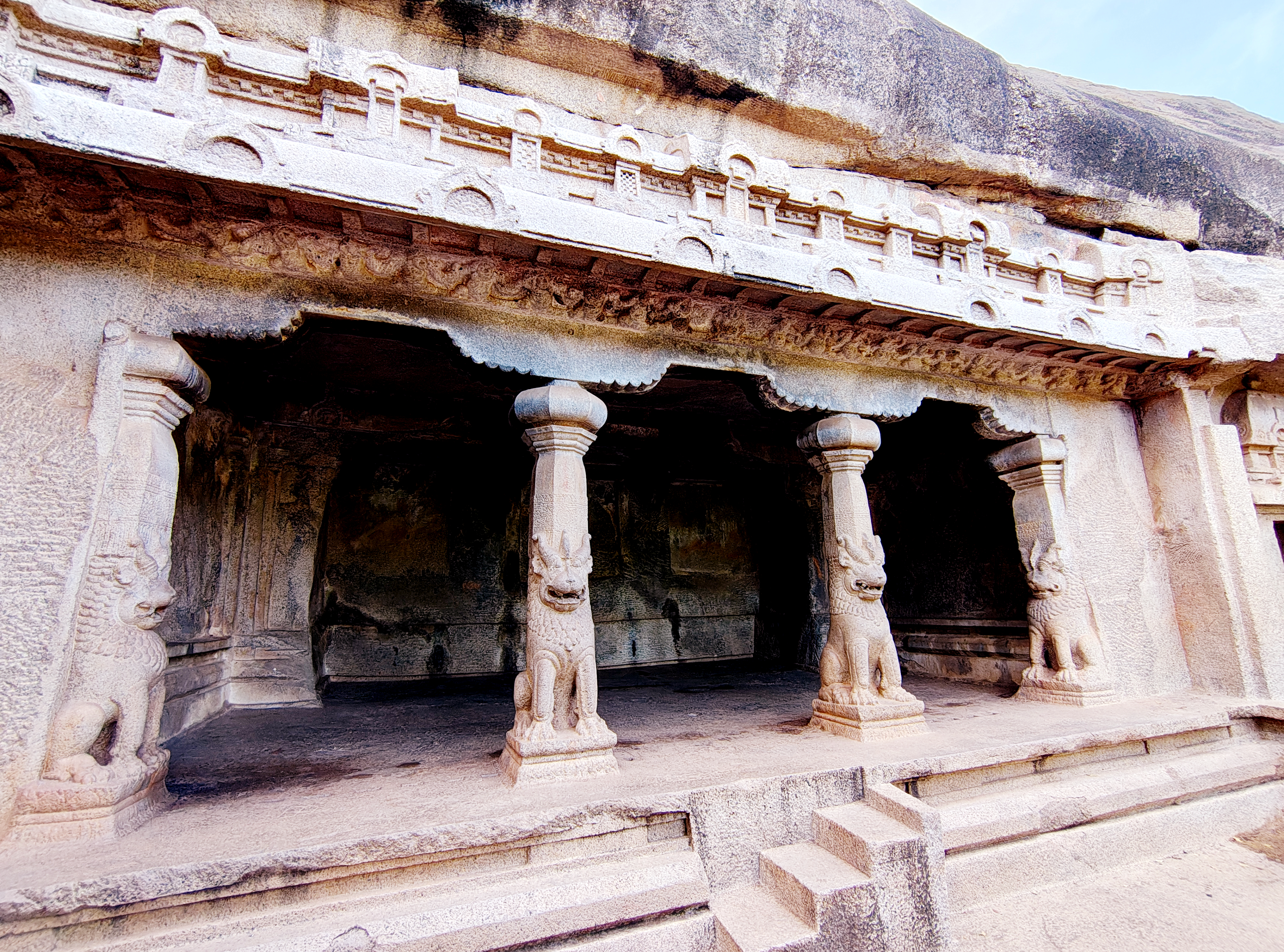
Ramanuja Mandapam

Some important structures include:

- Descent of the Ganges or Arjuna's Penance – a giant open-air rock relief.
- Pancha Rathas (Five Chariots) – five monolithic pyramidal structures named after the Pandavas (Arjuna, Bhima, Yudhishtra, Nakula and Sahadeva) and Draupadi. Each of these is carved from one single separate large piece of stone.
- Cave Temples – over ten rock-cut temples dating back to the 7th century. These include the Varaha, Adi Varaha, Krishna, Mahishasuramardini (Durga), Ramanuja, Dharmaraja, Koneri, Kotikal, Panchapandava and others.
- The Shore Temple – a structural temple along the Bay of Bengal with the entrance from the western side away from the sea. Recent excavations have revealed new structures here.
- Other structural temples including the Olakkanesvara temple and the lighthouse, along with rock-cut features such as the Draupadi's tank and Krishna's Butterball.
- Thirukadalmallai, the temple dedicated to Lord Vishnu.
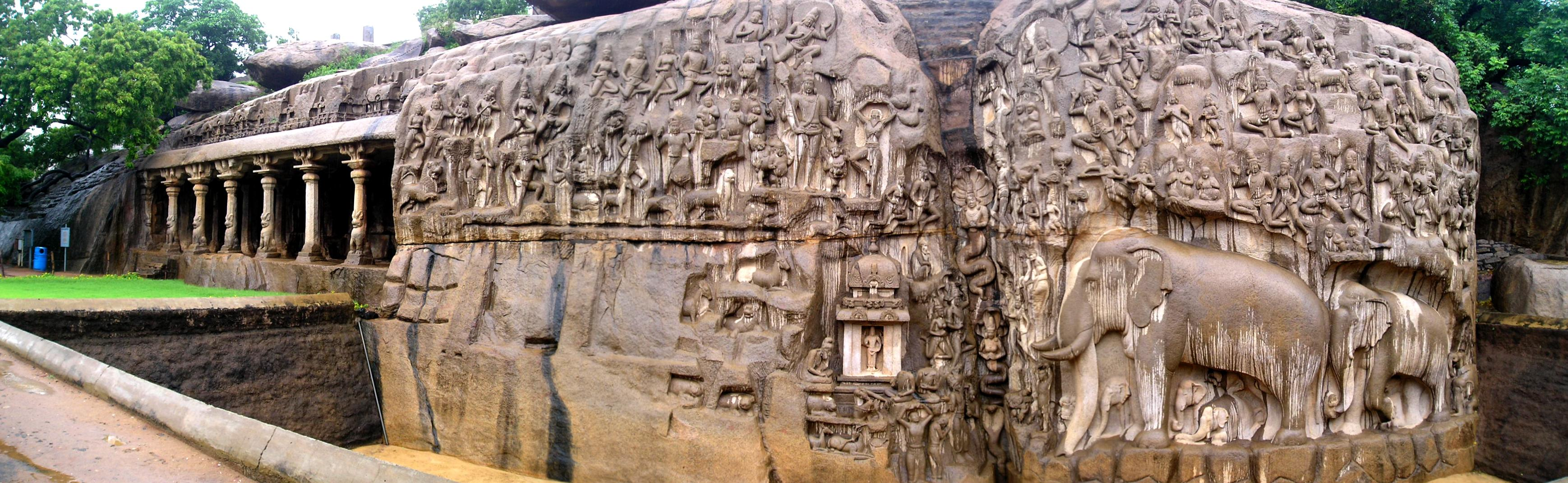
The Descent of the Ganges, also known as Arjuna's Penance, at Mahabalipuram, is one of the largest rock reliefs in Asia and features in several Hindu scriptures.

== Demography ==
As of 2001 India census, Mahabalipuram had a population of 12,345. Males constitute 52% of the population and females 48%. Mahabalipuram has an average literacy rate of 74%, higher than the national average of 73%: male literacy is 82%, and female literacy is 66%. In Mahabalipuram, 12% of the population is under 6 years of age.

== Events ==
In October 2019, Indian Prime Minister Narendra Modi and Chinese President Xi Jinping visited Arjuna's Penance, the Pancha Rathas complex and the Shore Temple in Mahabalipuram.
