= Nangur Vishnu Temples =

Group of eleven Vishnu temples in Tamil Nadu

The Vishnu temples at Nangur are a group of 11 temples near Nangur in Mayiladuthurai district of Tamil Nadu, India. The eleven temples are part of the 108 Divya Desams of the Hindu god Vishnu.

The temples at Nangur are believed to have been sanctified by Tirumangai Alvar, one of the 12 Alvars. The oldest of them have been dated to the reign of the Medieval Chola king Parantaka I.

Thirumangai Alvar's Reference to the Warriors of Nangur – Nālāyira Divya Prabandham, Pasuram 1293:

"Our father who is the earth, the sun, the moon and all other things and has taken the forms of a fish, a dwarf, a swan, a boar, a man-lion and a horse stays in the Thirumaṇikkuḍam temple in Nāngur where warriors chased off the northern Cholas and the strong southern Pandiyan kings and defeated them."

— Naalayira Divya Prabandham - 1293

== Festival ==
The Thirumangai Alvar Mangalasasana utsavam (festival) in the month of Thai (Jan-Feb) on the New Moon day (Amavasya) witnesses 11 Garuda sevai a spectacular event in which festival images idols from the 11 Thirunaangur Divya Desam shrines in the area are brought on Garuda mounts to Thirunangur.

An idol of Thirumangai Alvar is also brought here on a Hamsa Vahanam (palanquin) and his pasurams (verses) dedicated to each of these 11 temples are recited. The Utsavar (festival deity) of Thirumangai Alvar and his consort Sri Kumudavalli Naachiyar are taken in a palanquin to each of the 11 temples, through the paddy fields in the area.

The pasurams (poems) dedicated to each of the 11 Divya Desams are chanted in the respective shrines. This is the most important of the festivals in this area, and it draws thousands of visitors.

== Thirunangur Tirupathis ==
Name of the temple	Deity	Photo	Notes/Beliefs
Thirukkavalampadi	Gopalakrishna Perumal		Kavalam indicates garden, and padi indicates pasture - it is believed to be the site where Krishna offered a darshana to Indra as a Gopala. Once, Krishna, and his second favourite wife, Satyabhama, helped Indra by killing Narakasura, and returned to him his Airavata and kalpavriksha, which the asura had stolen. Indra invited Krishna to his Devaloka. One day, Satyabhama asked Indrani (Shachi, Indra's consort) for the parajatha flower worn by her. Indrani refused to give her the flower, stating that a being from Bhuloka was not qualified to wear the flower of the devas. For his wife's honour, Krishna forcibly took the kalpavriksha to Dvaraka. Realising the disrespect caused, Indra descended upon the earth, and made a beautiful flower garden (kavalam) to worship Krishna. Pleased by Indra's devotion, Krishna offered the king of the devas a divine sight, accompanied by a cow and calf. The place is hence called Kavalampadi.
Thiruvanpurushothamam	Purushotama Perumal		
Thiruarimeya Vinnagaram	Kudamudakoothan Perumal		Arimeya Vinnagaram literally translates to the place where Hari (another name of Vishnu) resides. It is believed that sage Uthanga performed his penance at this place. There is another local legend that Govardana (Vishnu) descended here at the request of Shiva.
Thiruchsemponsey	Perarulaalan Perumal		Rama, the seventh avatar of Vishnu came to this place after killing Ravana. He made a golden idol of a cow and gifted to a Brahmin from the ashram of sage Dranethra, from where the place obtained its name.
Thirumanimadam	Badari Narayana Perumal		The eleven Rudras, called Ekadas Rudras and king of devas, Indra, are believed to have worshiped Vishnu at this temple. The presiding deity of Badrinath Temple, Badrinath, is believed to have visited the place on the request of Shiva. Ramanuja is believed to have learnt Tirumandiram from Thirukoshtiyur Nambi at this place.
Thiruvaikunda vinnagaram	Vaikunta Nathan Perumal		
Thiruthevanartthogai	Madhava Perumal Temple		
Thiruthetriyambalam	Palli Konda Perumal		It is believed that the presiding deity of Srirangam Ranganathaswamy temple arrived here on the request of Shiva. It is referred as Ambalam, which in Malayalam means temple.
Thirumanikkoodam	Varadaraja Perumal		
Thiruvellakkulam or Annan Koil	Annan Perumal Temple		
Thiruppaarththanpalli	Thamarayil Kelvan Perumal temple		Krishna appeared to Arjuna, a Pandava prince as Parthasarathy and initiated his knowledge to understand who he actually was. Since Parthasarathy initiated education here for Arjuna, the place is called Parthanpalli. (Parthan + Palli, meaning school
