= Thiruvanpurushothamam =

Perumal temple in Mayiladuthurai district, Tamil Nadu, India

Purushotama Perumal Temple
- Thiru Vanpurushothamam
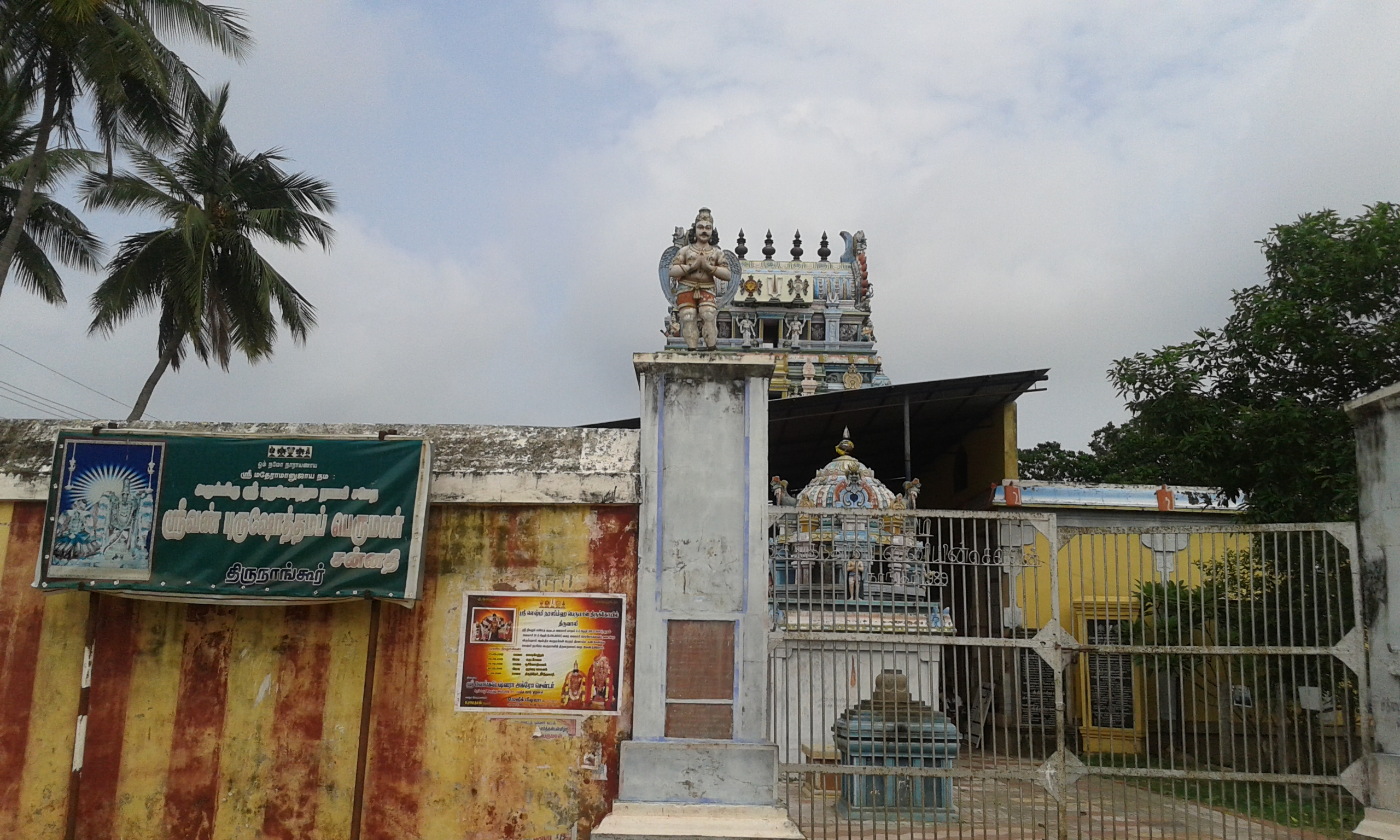

- Location in Tamil Nadu

Religion
- Affiliation: Hinduism
- District: Mayiladuthurai
- Deity: Purushottama Perumal (Vishnu); Pusushottama Nayaki (Lakshmi)

Location
- Location: Thirunangur
- State: Tamil Nadu
- Country: India
- Coordinates: 11°10′39″N 79°46′45″E

Architecture
- Type: Dravidian architecture

The Purushotama Perumal Temple is located in Thirunangur, a village in the outskirts of Sirkazhi in the South Indian state of Tamil Nadu, and is dedicated to the Hindu god Vishnu. Constructed in the Dravidian style of architecture, the temple is glorified in the Nalayira Divya Prabandham, the early medieval Tamil canon of the Alvar saints from the 6th–9th centuries CE. It is one of the 108 Divya Desams dedicated to Vishnu, who is worshipped as Purushottaman and his consort Lakshmi as Purushottama Nayagi.

It is one among the eleven Divya Desams of Thirunangur Tirupathis and is closely associated with Thirumangai Alvar. The temple is open from 8 a.m. to 10 a.m. and 5 p.m. to 7 p.m and has four daily rituals at various times of the day. The Thirumangai Alvar Mangalasasana Utsavam celebrated annually during the Tamil month of Thai is the major festival of the temple during which the festival images of the eleven Thirunangur Tirupathis are brought on mount designed like Garuda, called Garuda Vahana, to Thirunangur.

== Legend ==
The legend of all the eleven temples of Thirunangur are closely associated with each other. As per legend, the Hindu god Shiva started dancing in fury at this place after the death of his consort Uma due to the yajna (sacrifice) of Daksha. Each time his lock of hair touched the ground, there were eleven other forms of Shiva who appeared. The celestial deities were worried that if the dance continues, it would result in decimation of entire creations. They prayed to Vishnu for help, who appeared at this place. On seeing Vishnu, Shiva's anger was reduced and he requested Vishnu to appear in eleven forms like he did. On his request, Vishnu appeared in eleven different forms at Tirunangur. The eleven places where Vishnu appeared are believed to be where the eleven temples in Tirunangur are located. As per another variant, Shiva requested Vishnu to appear in eleven different forms like him to control the eleven Shiva forms he created. The eleven Rudras, called Ekadas Rudras and king of devas, Indra, are believed to have worshiped Vishnu at this temple.

== Architecture ==
Purushothama Perumal temple has a small shrine with Vimanam and only one sanctum. It is surrounded by paddy fields and is located in Thirunangur, a small village, 10 km away from Sirkali and Thiruvenkadu. The temple has a three tiered vimana (shrine over the sanctum), and the shrines of the temple are enclosed by rectangular walls. The image of the presiding deity Purushottaman and his consort Purushottanayagi are depicted in standing posture inside the sanctum. The image of the festival deities are also housed in the same shrine. The Garuda Mandapa is a small shrine located axial to the central shrine from the entrance and the altar. The temple has only one shrine, which has a small hall leading to the sanctum. There is a modern pillared hall from the shrine to the Garuda Mandapa.

== Religious importance ==
Purshottama Perumal temple is revered in Nalayira Divya Prabhandam, the 7th–9th century Sri Vaishnava canon, by Thirumangai Alvar. The temple is classified as a Divya Desam, one of the 108 Vishnu temples that are mentioned in the book. During the 18th and 19th centuries, the temple finds mention in several works like 108 Tirupati Antati by Divya Kavi Pillai Perumal Aiyangar. Sage Upamanyu is believed to have worshiped the presiding deity. It is believed that saint Thirumanagai Alvar visits the place every year to the festival to consecrate the eleven deities. As per local belief, the fresh winds which swirl the paddy fields before the day of the festival indicates a good harvest for the season. As per another legend, the sages Madangar, Domyar, Vyaghrapada and Udangar set up their hermitages in this place. According to the Mahabharata, Takshaka, the mighty snake king who killed king Parikshit, ruled the place called Nagapuri, which eventually became Nangur.

== Worship practices and festivals ==
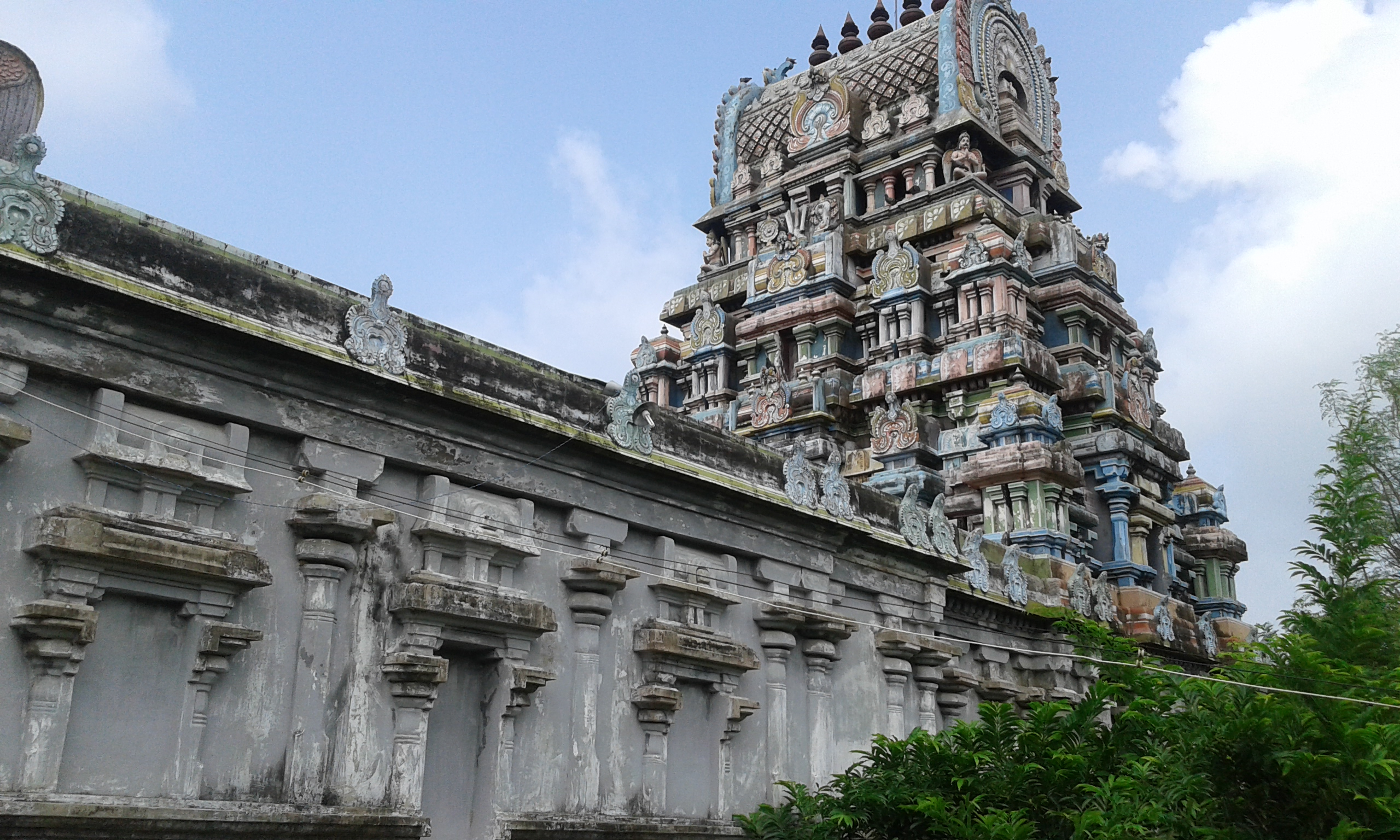
Image of the shrine over the sanctum

During the new moon day of the Tamil month Thai, the festival deity of Thirumangai Alvar is brought to the temple from Thiruvali-Thirunagari. The Thirumangai Alvar Mangalasasana Utsavam is celebrated in the Tamil month of Thai (January–February). The highlight of the festival is Garudasevai, an event in which the festival images of the eleven Thirunangur Tirupathis are brought on mount designed like Garuda, called Garuda Vahana, to Thirunangur. The festive image of Thirumangai Alvar is also brought on a Hamsa Vahanam (palanquin) and his pasurams (verses) dedicated to each of these eleven temples are recited during the occasion. The festival images of Thirumangai Alvar and his consort Kumudavalli Naachiyar are taken in a palanquin to each of the eleven temples. The verses dedicated to each of the eleven temples are chanted in the respective shrines. This is one of the most important festivals in the region which draws thousands of visitors.

== Sources ==
- R., Dr. Vijayalakshmy (2001). An introduction to religion and Philosophy - Tévarám and Tivviyappirapantam (1st ed.). Chennai: International Institute of Tamil Studies.
- T., Padmaja (2002). Temples of Kr̥ṣṇa in South India: history, art, and traditions in Tamilnāḍu. New Delhi: Shakti Malik. ISBN 81-7017-398-1.
