= Thiruvaikunda Vinnagaram =

Perumal temple in Mayiladuthurai district, Tamil Nadu, India

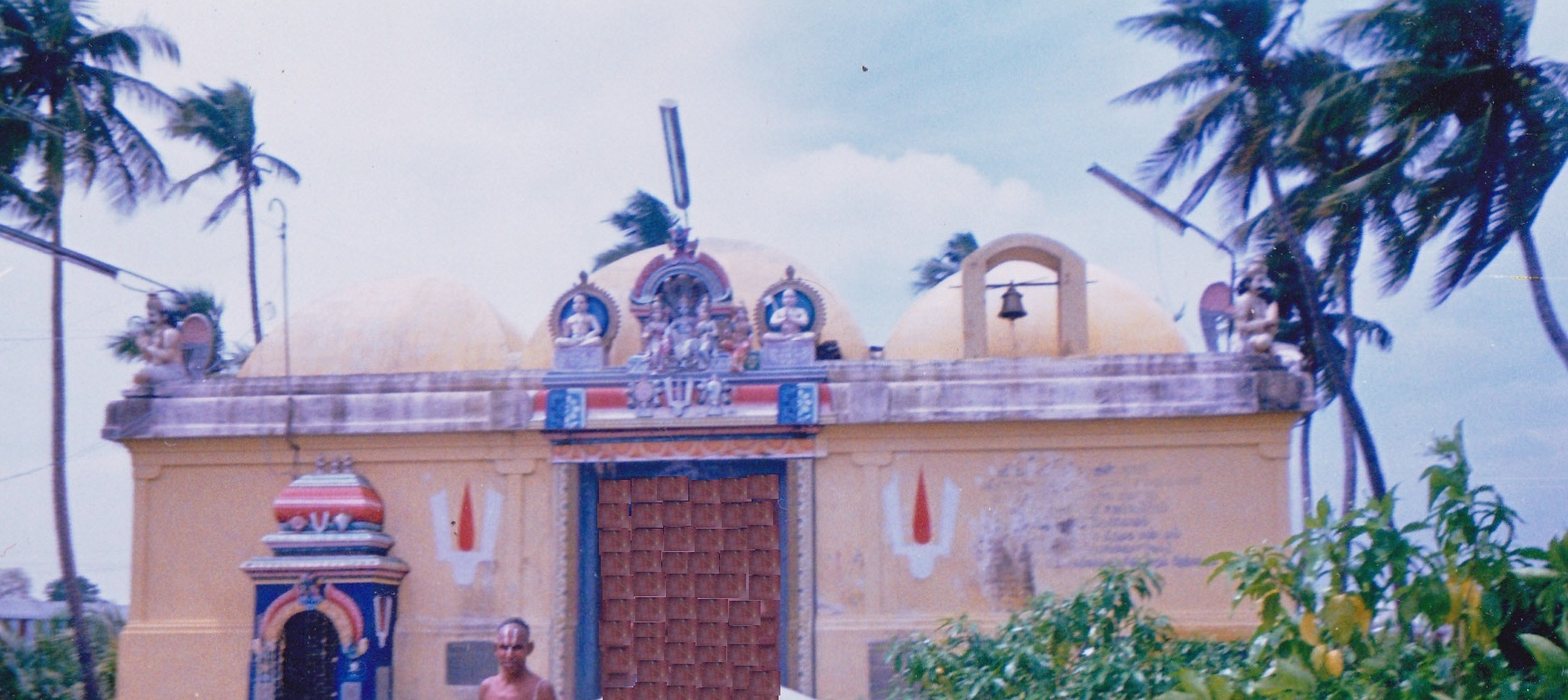

- Location in Tamil Nadu

Religion
- Affiliation: Hinduism
- District: Mayiladuthurai
- Deity: Vaikunta Nathan Perumal (Vishnu), Vaikunta Valli (Lakshmi)
- Festival: adi magam
- Features: Tower: Anantasatyavartaka; Temple tank: Lakshmi, viraja

Location
- Location: Thirunangur
- State: Tamil Nadu
- Country: India
- Coordinates: 11°10′39″N 79°46′45″E

Architecture
- Type: Dravidian architecture

Thiruvaikunda Vinnagaram or Vaikunta Nathan Perumal Temple is dedicated to Hindu god Vishnu located in Tirunangur, a village in the outskirts of Sirkazhi in the South Indian state of Tamil Nadu. Constructed in the Dravidian style of architecture, the temple is glorified in the Nalayira Divya Prabandham, the early medieval Tamil canon of the Alvar saints from the 6th–9th centuries CE. It is one of the 108 Divya Desams dedicated to Vishnu, who is worshipped as Vaikuntanathan and his consort Lakshmi as Vaikuntavalli.

It is one among the eleven Divya Desams of Thirunangur Tirupathis and is closely associated with Thirumangai Alvar. The temple is open from 8 a.m. to 10 a.m. and 5 p.m. to 7 p.m and has four daily rituals at various times of the day. The Thirumangai Alvar Mangalasasana Utsavam celebrated annually during the Tamil month of Tai is the major festival of the temple during which the festival images of the eleven Thirunangur Tirupatis are brought on mount designed like Garuda, called Garuda Vahana, to Thirunangur.

== Legend ==
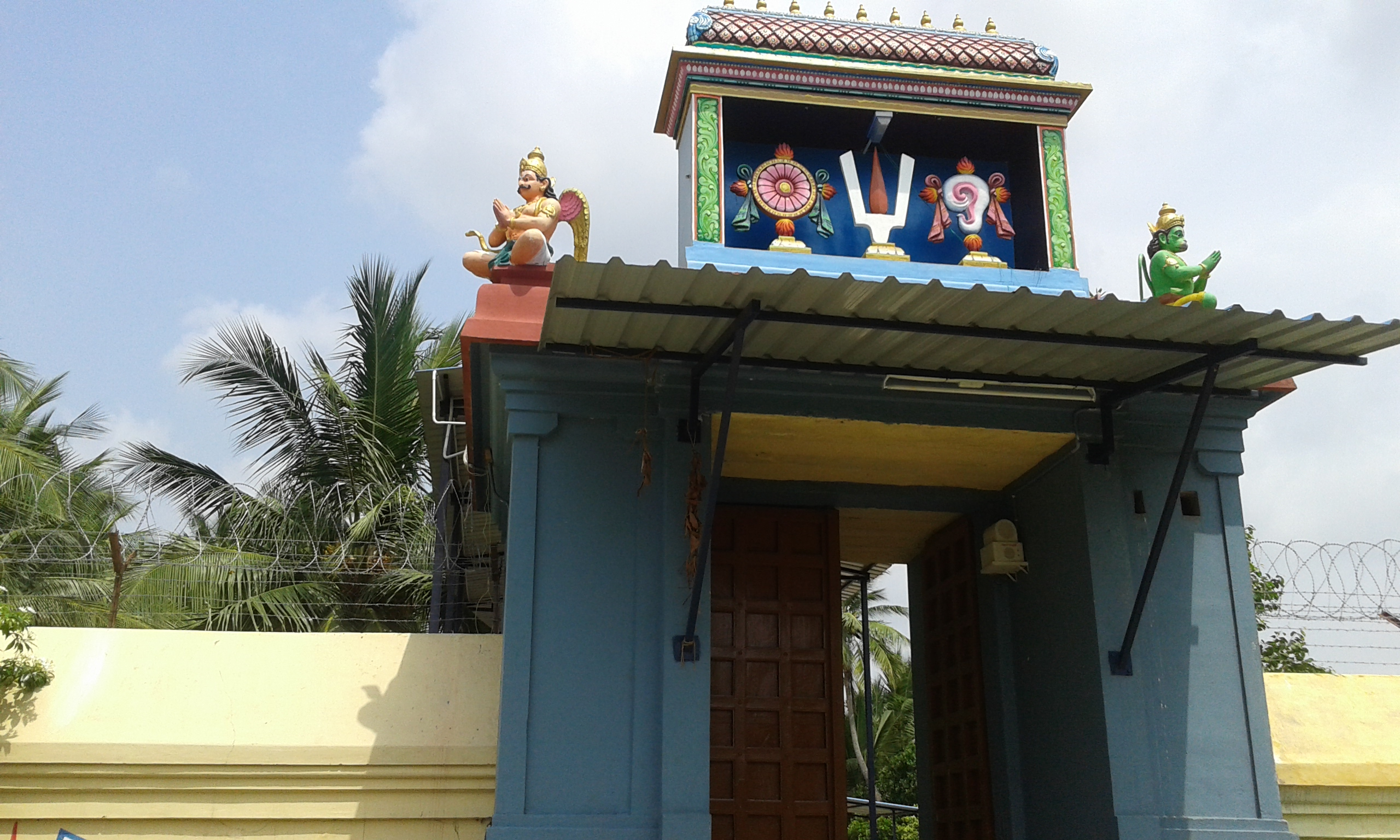
Entrance of the temple

The legend of all the eleven temples of Thirunangur are closely associated with each other. As per legend, the Hindu god Shiva started dancing in fury at this place after the death of his consort Uma due to the yagna (sacrifice) of Daksha. Each time his lock of hair touched the ground, there were eleven other forms of Shiva who appeared. The celestial deities were worried that if the dance continues, it would result in decimation of entire creations. They prayed to Vishnu for help, who appeared at this place. On seeing Vishnu, Shiva's anger was reduced and he requested Vishnu to appear in eleven forms like he did. On his request, Vishnu appeared in eleven different forms at Tirunangur. The eleven places where Vishnu appeared are believed to be where the eleven temples in Tirunangur are located. As per another variant, Shiva requested Vishnu to appear in eleven different forms like him to control the eleven Shiva forms he created. The eleven Rudras, called Ekadas Rudras and king of devas, Indra, are believed to have worshiped Vishnu at this temple.

== Architecture ==
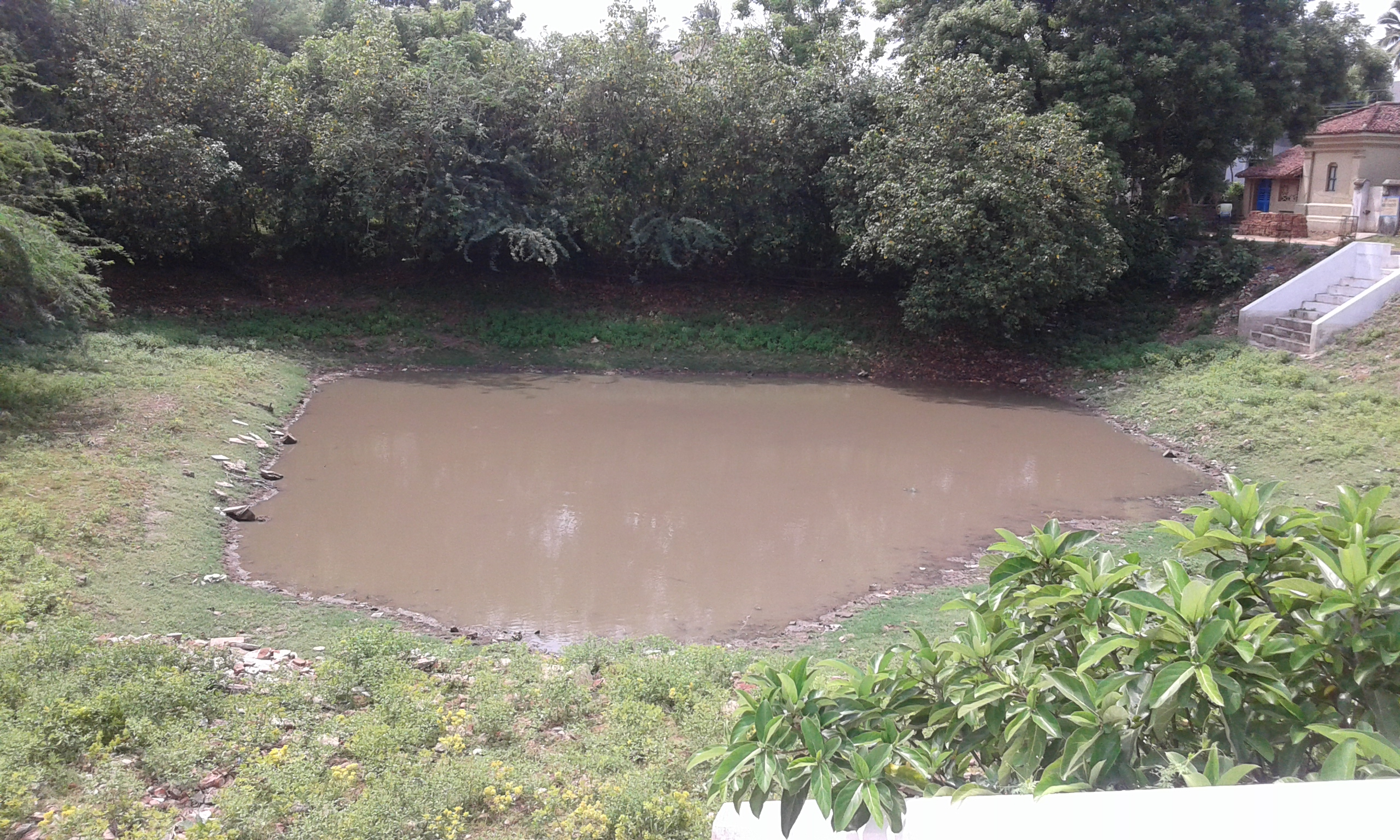
Temple tank outside the main entrance

The temple complex has a single prakaram (closed precincts of a temple). The sanctum here is believed to be on par with celestial Vaikuntham. It is located in Thirunangur, a small village, 10 km away from Sirkali en route to Thiruvenkadu. The temple tank is located to the north of the temple. The presiding deity is believed to have worshiped by sage Uthankar and King Uparisarvasara. The presiding deity, Vaikuntanathar (also called Thamaraikannudiyabiran - the one with lotus eyes), his consort and the festival images are housed in the sanctum. The temple has only one shrine. The walls around the temple are a modern addition. The Garuda Mandapa is located axial to the central shrine and located close to the entrance.

== Religious significance ==
The temple is revered in Nalayira Divya Prabhandam, the 7th–9th century Vaishnava canon, by Periyalvar, Thirumalisai Alvar and Thirumangai Alvar. The temple is classified as a Divya Desam, one of the 108 Vishnu temples that are mentioned in the book. During the 18th and 19th centuries, the temple finds mention in several works like 108 Tirupathi Anthathi by Divya Kavi Pillai Perumal Aiyangar. As per another variant, Shiva requested Vishnu to appear in eleven different forms like him to control the eleven Shiva forms he created. The eleven Rudras, called Ekadas Rudras and king of devas, Indra, are believed to have worshiped Vishnu at this temple.

== Worship practices and festivals ==
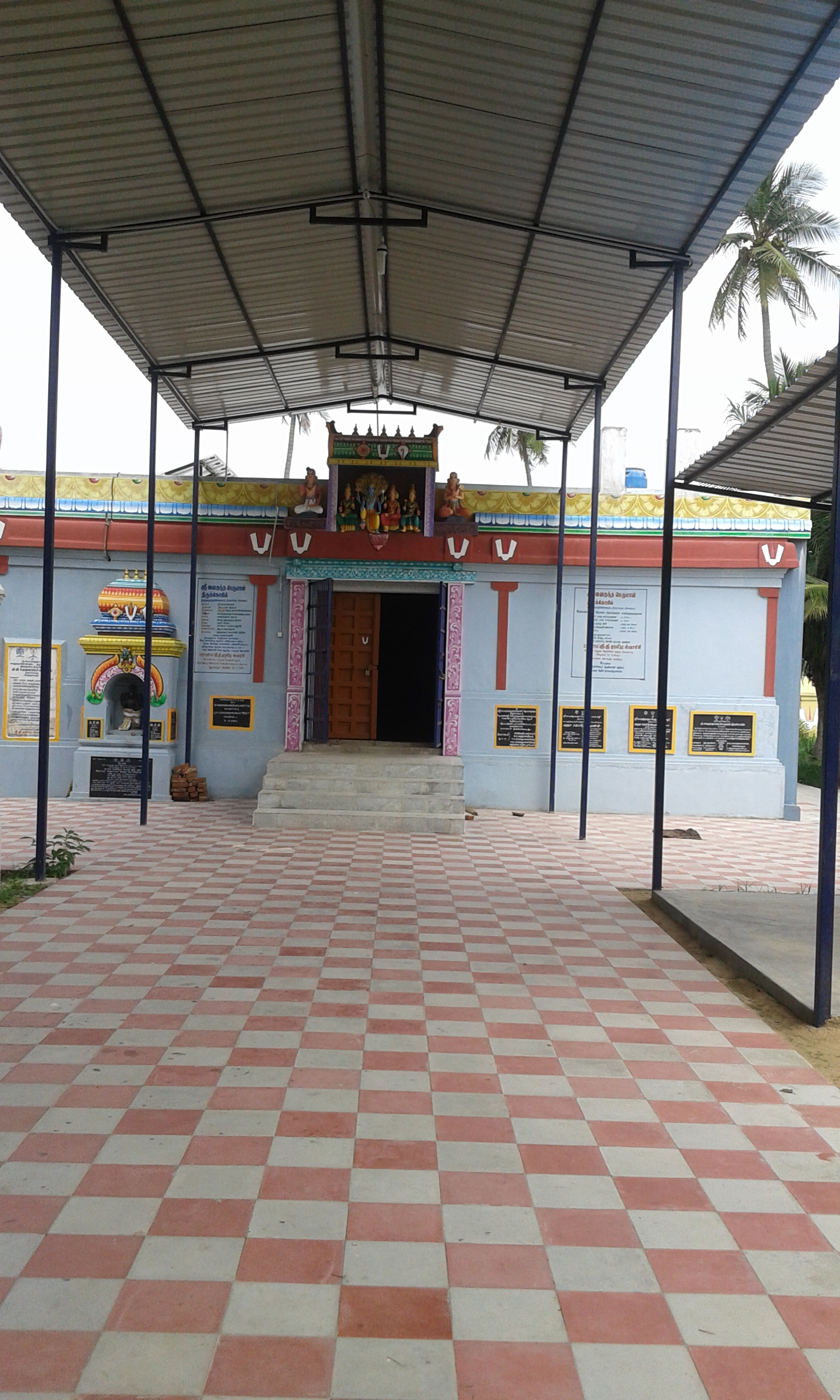
Entrance to the sanctum

The temple is open from 8 a.m. to 10 a.m. and 5 p.m. to 7 p.m. The temple priests perform the pooja (rituals) during festivals and on a daily basis. As at other Vishnu temples of Tamil Nadu, the priests belong to the Vaishnava tradition, from the Brahmin community. The temple rituals are performed four times a day: Ushathkalam at 8 a.m., Kalasanthi at 10:00 a.m., Sayarakshai at 5:00 p.m. and Ardha Jamam at 7:00 p.m. Each ritual has three steps: alangaram (decoration), neivethanam (food offering) and deepa aradanai (waving of lamps) for both Vaikuntanathan and his consort Vaikuntavalli. During the worship, religious instructions in the Vedas (sacred text) are recited by priests, and worshippers prostrate themselves in front of the temple mast. There are weekly, monthly and fortnightly rituals performed in the temple.

During the new moon day of the Tamil month Thai, the festival deity of Thirumangai Alvar is brought to the temple from Thiruvali-Thirunagari. The Thirumangai Alvar Mangalasasana Utsavam is celebrated in the Tamil month of Thai (January–February). The highlight of the festival is Garudasevai, an event in which the festival images of the eleven Thirunangur Tirupathis are brought on mount designed like Garuda, called Garuda Vahana, to Thirunangur. The festive image of Thirumangai Alvar is also brought on a Hamsa Vahanam (palanquin) and his pasurams (verses) dedicated to each of these eleven temples are recited during the occasion. The festival images of Thirumangai Alvar and his consort Kumudavalli Naachiyar are taken in a palanquin to each of the eleven temples. The verses dedicated to each of the eleven temples are chanted in the respective shrines. This is one of the most important festivals in the region which draws thousands of visitors.
