= Thirumanikkoodam =

Perumal temple in Mayiladuthurai district, Tamil Nadu, India

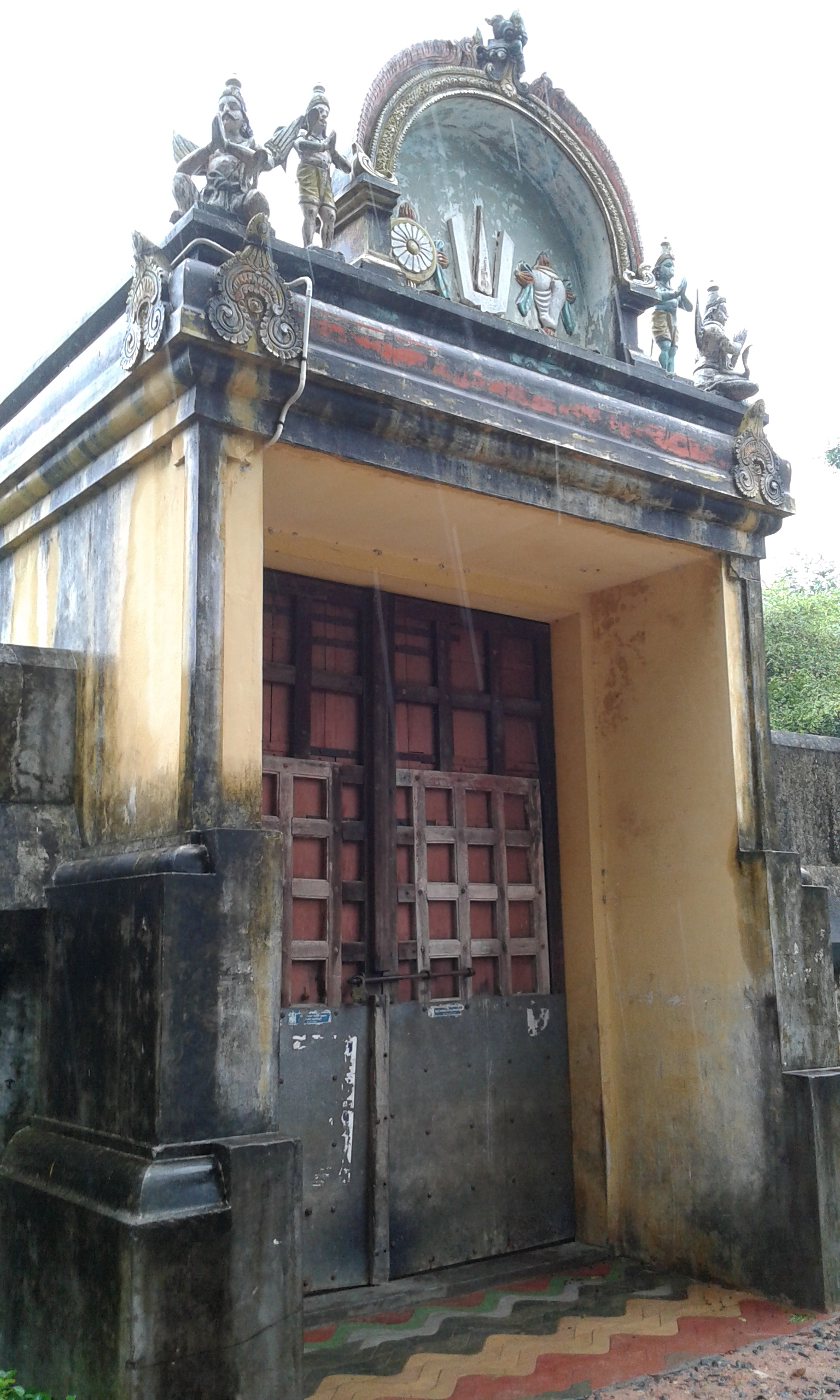

- Location in Tamil Nadu

Religion
- Affiliation: Hinduism
- District: Mayiladuthurai
- Deity: Varadaraja Perumal, Senkanmal (Vishnu); Thirumamagal, Bhoodevi (Lakshmi)
- Features: Tower: Kanaka

Location
- Location: Thirunangur
- State: Tamil Nadu
- Country: India
- Coordinates: 11°10′46″N 79°47′17″E

Architecture
- Type: Dravidian architecture

Thirumanikkoodam or Varadaraja Perumal Temple is located in Thirunangur, a village in the outskirts of Sirkaḻi in the Indian state of Tamil Nadu. It is dedicated to the Hindu god Vishnu. Constructed in the Dravidian style of architecture, the temple is mentioned in the Nalayira Divya Prabandham, the early medieval Tamil canon of the Alvar saints from the 6th–9th centuries CE. It is one of the 108 Divya Desams dedicated to Vishnu, who is worshipped as Varadharaja Perumal.

It is one among the eleven Divya Desams of Thirunangur Tirupatis and is closely associated with Thirumangai Alvar. It is also the only temple in the Nangur Divya Desams to have revered by a poet-saint other than Thirumangai Alvar. As per Hindu legend, the temple tank for dug by Arjuna from the age of Mahabharata. Krishna is regarded to have appeared as Parthasarathy to Arjuna here and initiated his education, leading to the name of the temple.

== Legend ==
The temple legends of all the eleven temples of Thirunangur are closely associated with each other. As per legend, the Hindu god Shiva started dancing in fury at this place after the death of his consort Uma due to the yajna (sacrifice) of Daksha. Each time his lock of hair touched the ground, there were eleven other forms of Shiva who appeared. The celestial deities were worried that if the dance continues, it would result in decimation of entire creations. They prayed to Vishnu for help, who appeared at this place. On seeing Vishnu, Shiva's anger was reduced and he requested Vishnu to appear in eleven forms like he did. On his request, Vishnu appeared in eleven different forms at Tirunangur. The eleven places where Vishnu appeared are believed to be where the eleven temples in Tirunangur are located. As per another variant, Shiva requested Vishnu to appear in eleven different forms like him to control the eleven Shiva forms he created. The eleven Rudras, called Ekadas Rudras and the king of devas, Indra, are believed to have worshipped Vishnu at this temple.

== Architecture ==
The temple complex has a single prakaram (outer courtyard) and a single shrine. It is located close to Thirunangur, a small village, 8 km east of Sirkali en route to Thiruvenkadu. Eleven Rudras and the king of celestial deities, Devas, are believed to have worshipped Varadarajar. The presiding deity, Varadharajaperumal is housed in the sanctum in standing posture, facing east. The images of his consort, Sridevi (also called Thirumaamangal Nachiyar) and Bhudevi are housed in the same shrine. The images of the festival deities are housed in the respective sanctums, while the figurative images of the vehicles carrying the deities are housed in the hall leading to the sanctum.

== Festival ==
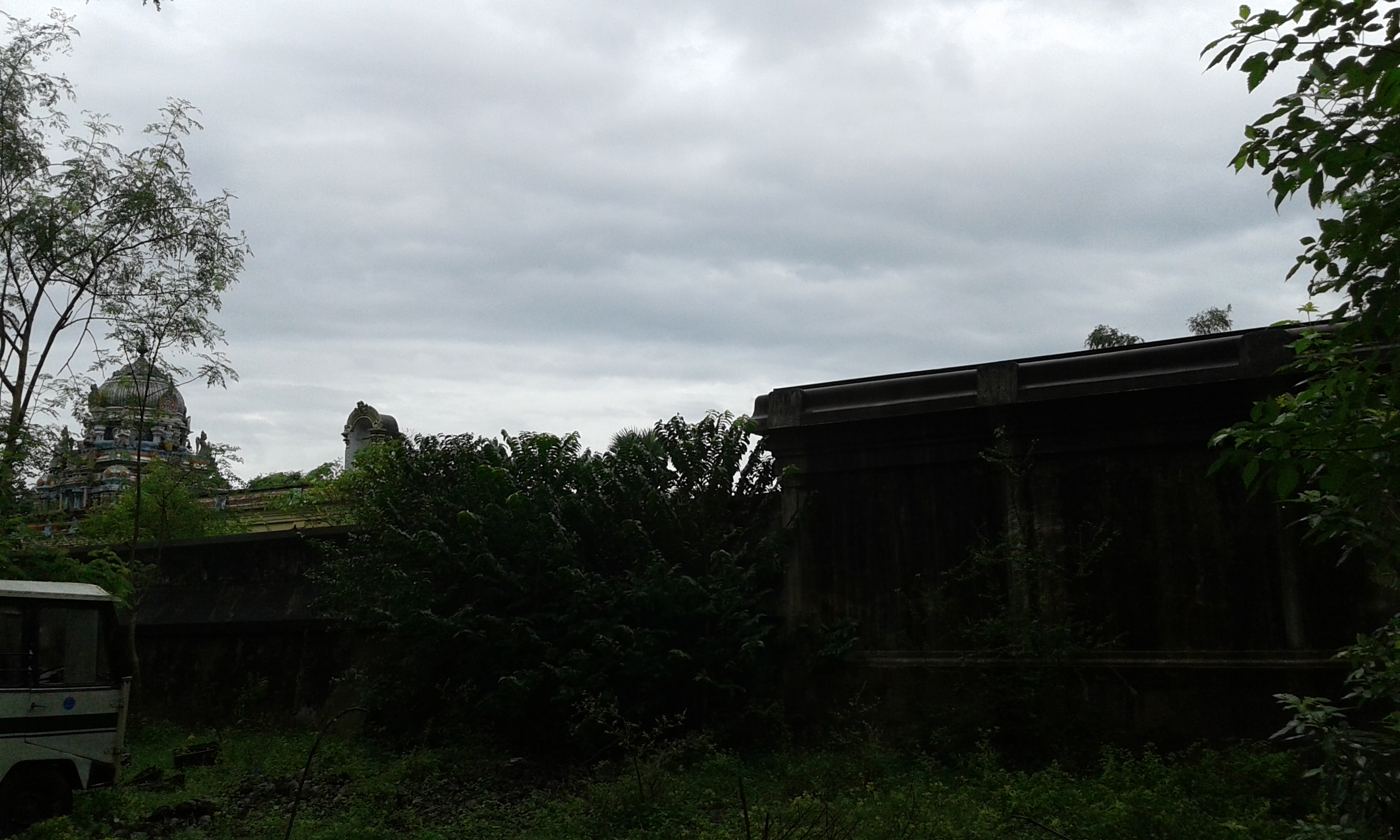
Vimana and pillared hall as seen from outside the temple

The annual Theerthavari festival is celebrated during the New moon day of Tamil month of Aadi when the festival deity of the temple is taken in a procession to the sea at Poompuhar. During the new moon day of the Tamil month Thai, the festival deity of Thirumangai Alvar is brought to the temple from Thiruvali-Thirunagari. The Thirumangai Alvar Mangalasasana Utsavam is celebrated in the Tamil month of Thai (January–February). The highlight of the festival is Garudasevai, an event in which the festival images of the eleven Thirunangur Tirupatis are brought on mount designed like Garuda, called Garuda Vahana, to Thirunangur. The festive image of Thirumangai Alvar is also brought on a Hamsa Vahanam (palanquin) and his paasurams (verses) dedicated to each of these eleven temples are recited during the occasion. The festival images of Thirumangai Alvar and his consort Kumudavalli Naachiyar are taken in a palanquin to each of the eleven temples. The verses dedicated to each of the eleven temples are chanted in the respective shrines. This is one of the most important festivals in the region which draws thousands of visitors.

== Religious significance ==
The temple is revered in Nalayira Divya Prabhandam, the 7th–9th century Sri Vaishnava canon, by Periyalvar, Tirumalisai Alvar, and Tirumangai Alvar. The temple is classified as a Divya Desam, one of the 108 Vishnu temples that are mentioned in the book. During the 18th and 19th centuries, the temple finds mention in several works like 108 Tirupati Antati by Divya Kavi Pillai Perumal Aiyangar. It is believed that saint Tirumangai Alvar visits the place every year to the festival to consecrate the eleven deities. As per local belief, the fresh winds which swirl the paddy fields before the day of the festival indicates a good harvest for the season. As per another legend, the sages Madangar, Domyar, Vyaghrapada and Udangar set up their hermitages in this place. During the period of Mahabharata, Takshaka, the mighty snake king who killed king Parikshit, ruled the place called Nagapuri, which eventually became Nangur.

== Notes ==
- Ayyar, P. V. Jagadisa (1993). South Indian shrines: illustrated (2 ed.). New Delhi: Asian Educational Services. ISBN 81-206-0151-3.
