= Thiruthevanartthogai =

Perumal temple in Mayiladuthurai district, Tamil Nadu, India

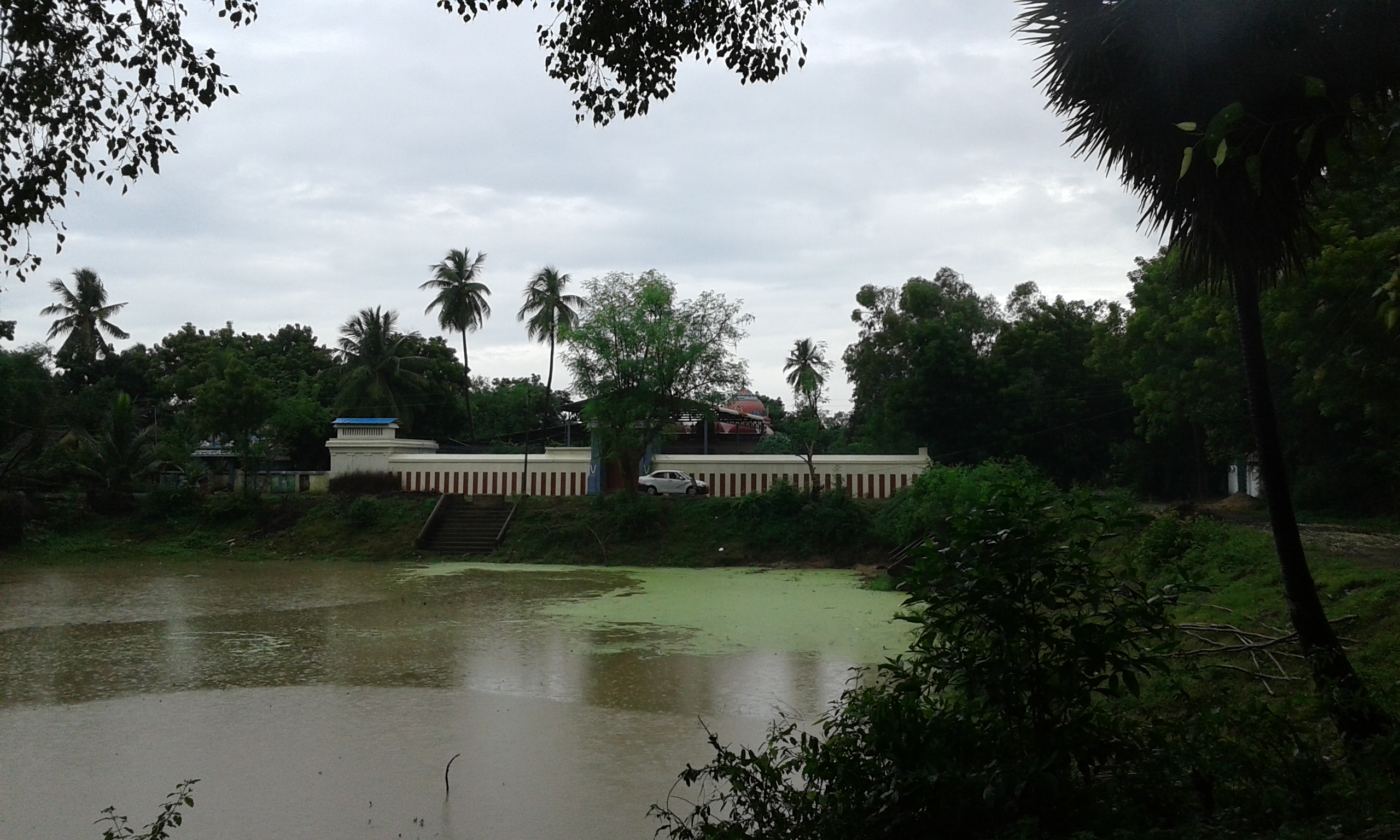

- Location in Tamil Nadu

Religion
- Affiliation: Hinduism
- District: Mayiladuthurai
- Deity: Madhava Perumal, Deivanayakan (Vishnu), Kadalmagal (Lakshmi)
- Features: Tower: Sopana; Temple tank: Sopana

Location
- Location: Kiḻchalai
- State: Tamil Nadu
- Country: India
- Coordinates: 11°11′48″N 79°46′31″E

Architecture
- Type: Dravidian architecture

Thiruthevanartthogai or Madhava Perumal Temple is a Hindu temple dedicated to Vishnu located in Tirunangur, a village in the outskirts of Sirkaḻi in the South Indian state of Tamil Nadu. Constructed in the Dravidian style of architecture, the temple is mentioned in the Nalayira Divya Prabandham, the early medieval Tamil canon of the Alvar saints from the 6th–9th centuries CE. It is one of the 108 Divya Desams dedicated to Vishnu, who is worshipped as Madhava Perumal and his consort Lakshmi as Kadalmagal.

It is one among the eleven Divya Desams of Tirunangur Tirupatis and is closely associated with Thirumangai Alvar. The Thirumangai Alvar Mangalasasana Utsavam celebrated annually during the Tamil month of Tai is the major festival of the temple during which the festival images of the eleven Tirunangur Tirupatis are brought on mount designed like Garuda, called Garuda Vahana, to Tirunangur. The temple follows the Tenkalai mode of worship.

== Legend ==
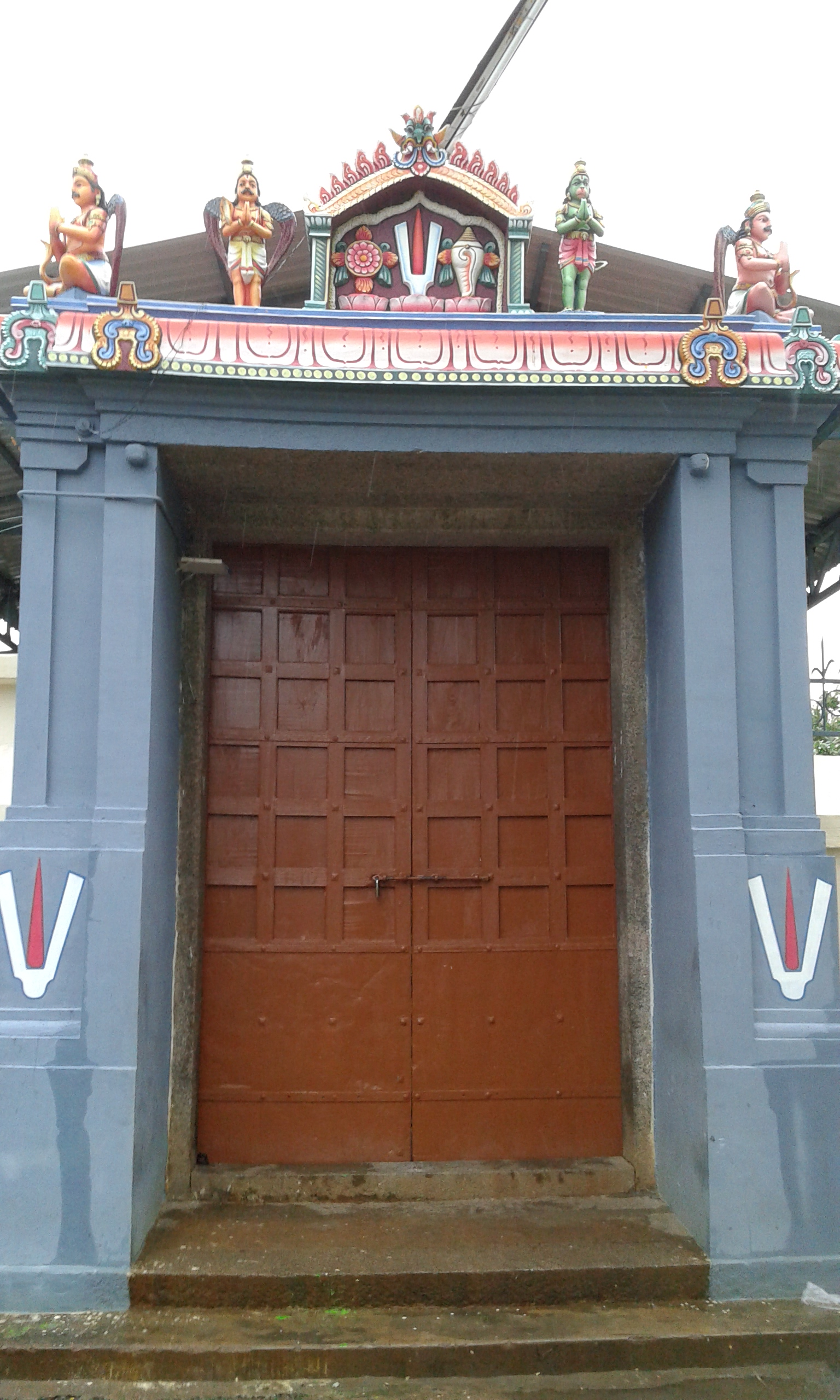
Image of the entrance

The legend of all the eleven temples of Tirunangur are closely associated with each other. As per legend, the Hindu god Shiva started dancing in fury at this place after the death of his consort Sati due to the episode of the daksha yajna. Each time his lock of hair touched the ground, there were eleven other forms of Shiva who appeared. The celestial deities were worried that if the dance continues, it would result in decimation of entire creations. They prayed to Vishnu for help, who appeared at this place. On seeing Vishnu, Shiva's anger was reduced and he requested Vishnu to appear in eleven forms like he did. On his request, Vishnu appeared in eleven different forms at Tirunangur. The eleven places where Vishnu appeared are believed to be where the eleven temples in Tirunangur are located. It is believed that the celestial deities had an assembly here at the temple. It is also believed that sage Vasishtha is believed to have worshipped Vishnu at this temple. As per another variant, Shiva requested Vishnu to appear in eleven different forms like him to control the eleven Shiva forms he created. The eleven rudras, called ekadas rudras and king of devas, Indra, are believed to have worshipped Vishnu at this temple.

== Architecture ==
The temple faces west and has a three-tiered rajagopuram with all the shrines enclosed in concentric rectangular walls. The presiding deity, Deivanayagan, in standing posture faces east. The images of the consort, Kadalmagal Nachiyar and the festival deities, Madhava Perumal and Madhava Nayagi are housed in the same shrine. The Garuda mandapa is located near the flagstaff axial to the sanctum. There is a precinct around the sanctum. The temple tank is located in front of the temple.

== Religious significance ==
The temple is mentioned in Nalayira Divya Prabhandam, the 7th–9th century Vaishnava canon, by Peryalvar, Thirumalisai Alvar and Thirumangai Alvar. The temple is classified as a Divya Desam, one of the 108 Vishnu temples that are mentioned in the book. During the 18th and 19th centuries, the temple finds mention in several works like 108 Tirupathi Anthathi by Divya Kavi Pillai Perumal Aiyangar. It is believed that saint Thirumanagai Alvar visits the place every year to the festival to consecrate the eleven deities. As per local belief, the fresh winds which swirl the paddy fields before the day of the festival indicates a good harvest for the season. As per another legend, the sages Madangar, Domyar, Vyaghrapada and Udangar set up their hermitages in this place. During the period of Mahabharata, Takshaka, the mighty snake king who killed king Parikshit, ruled the place called Nagapuri, which eventually became Nangur.

== Festivals ==
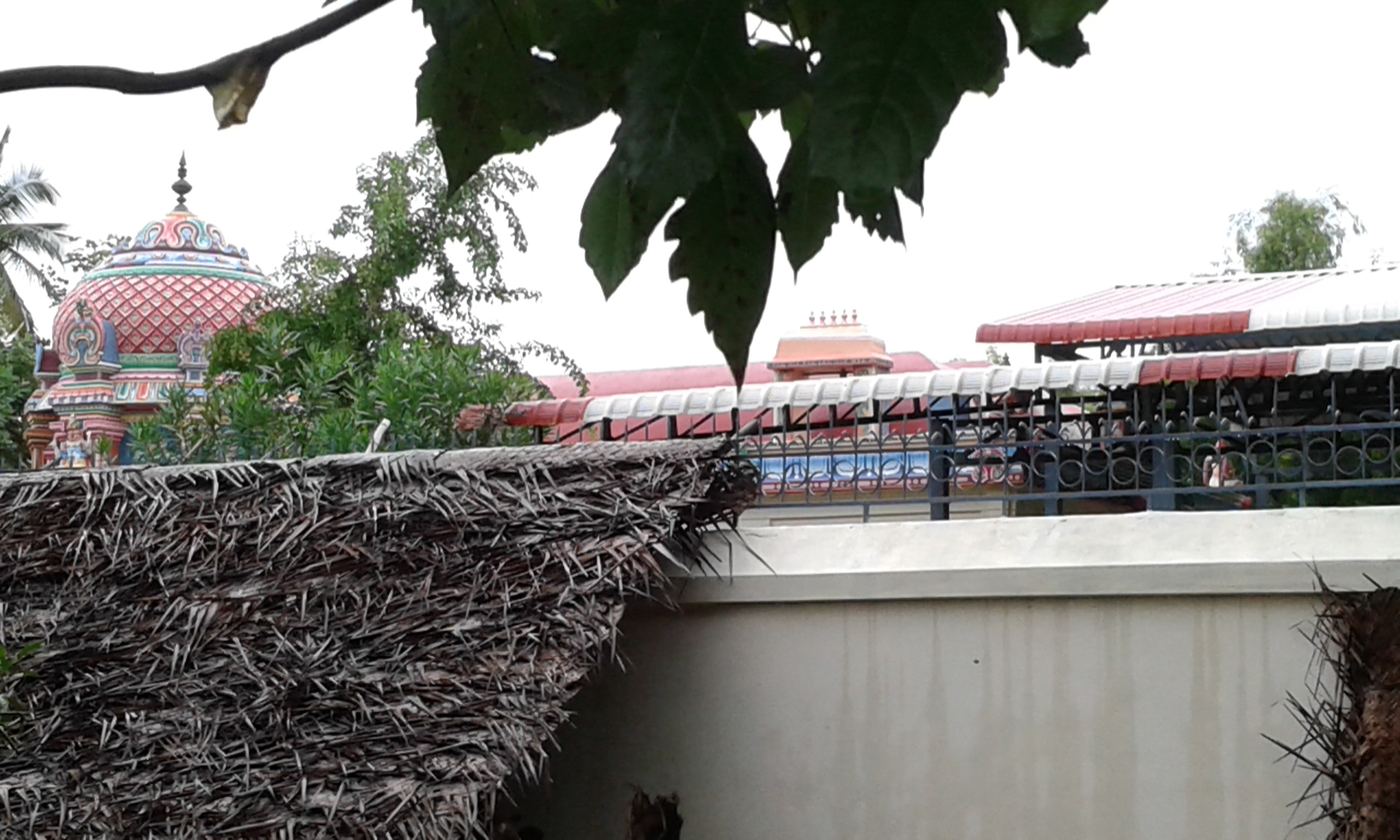
The vimana of the temple

During the new moon day of the Tamil month Tai, the festival deity of Thirumangai Alvar is brought to the temple from Thiruvali-Thirunagari. The Thirumangai Alvar Mangalasasana Utsavam is celebrated in the Tamil month of Thai (January–February). The highlight of the festival is Garudasevai, an event in which the festival images of the eleven Tirunangur Tirupatis are brought on mount designed like Garuda, called Garuda Vahana, to Tirunangur. The festive image of Thirumangai Alvar is also brought on a Hamsa Vahanam (palanquin) and his pasurams (verses) dedicated to each of these eleven temples are recited during the occasion. The festival images of Thirumangai Alvar and his consort Kumudavalli Naachiyar are taken in a palanquin to each of the eleven temples. The verses dedicated to each of the eleven temples are chanted in the respective shrines. This is one of the most important festivals in the region which draws thousands of visitors.

== Sources ==
- R., Dr. Vijayalakshmy (2001). An introduction to religion and Philosophy - Tévarám and Tivviyappirapantam (1st ed.). Chennai: International Institute of Tamil Studies.
