= Thiruchsemponsey =

Perumal temple in Mayiladuthurai district, Tamil Nadu, India

Perarulaalan Perumal Temple
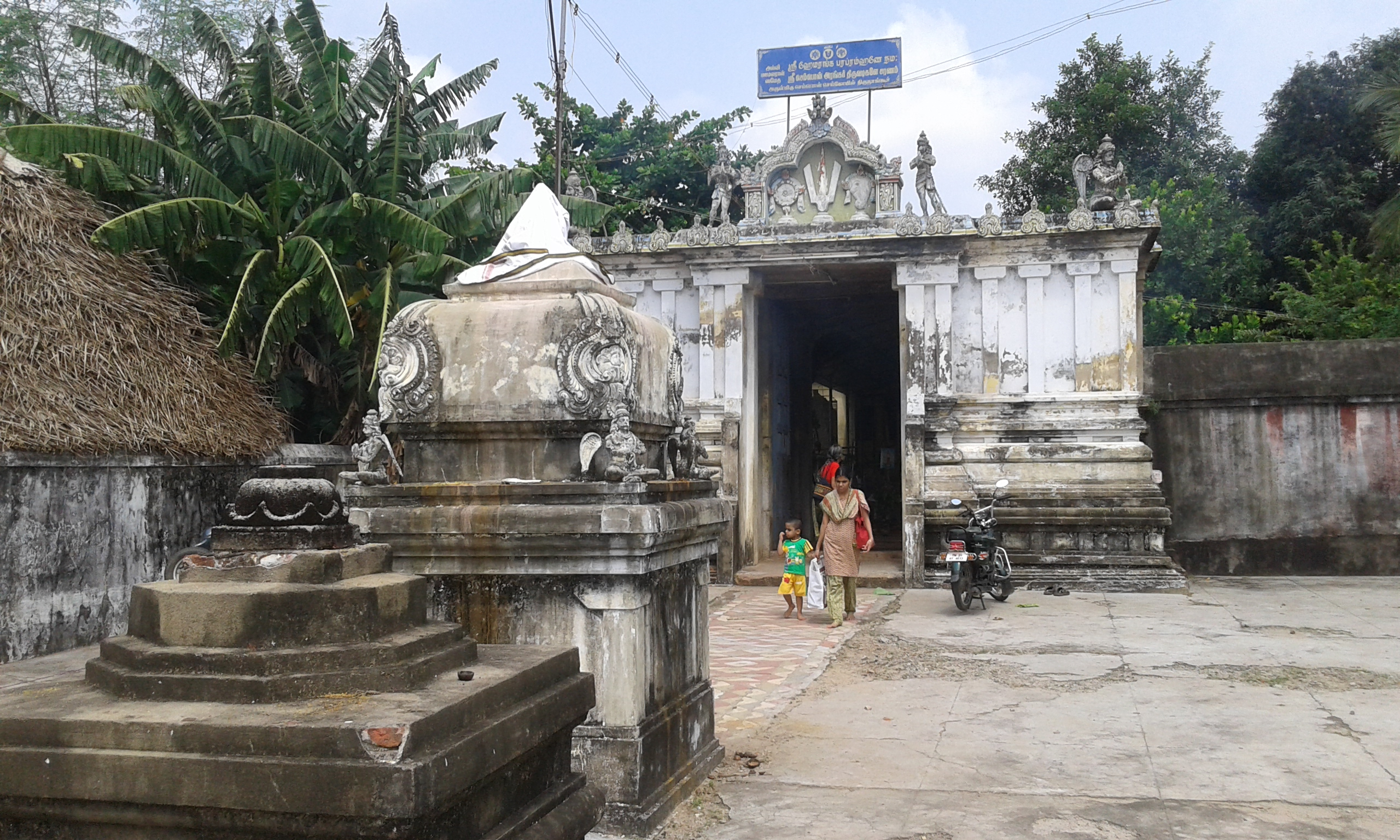

- Location in Tamil Nadu

Religion
- Affiliation: Hinduism
- District: Mayiladuthurai
- Deity: Perarulaalan Perumal (Vishnu) Alli Mamalar (Lakshmi)
- Festival: iypasi swati bromotsavam
- Features: Tower: Kanaga

Location
- Location: Thirunangur
- State: Tamil Nadu
- Country: India
- Coordinates: 11°10′42″N 79°46′46″E

Architecture
- Type: Dravidian architecture
- Direction of façade: East facing standing posture

Thiruchsemponsey or Perarulaalan Perumal Temple is dedicated to Hindu god Vishnu located in Thirunangur, a village in the outskirts of Sirkazhi in the South Indian state of Tamil Nadu. Constructed in the Dravidian style of architecture, the temple is glorified in the Nalayira Divya Prabandham, the early medieval Tamil canon of the Alvar saints from the 6th–9th centuries AD. It is one of the 108 Divya Desam dedicated to Vishnu, who is worshipped as Peralulalan and his consort Lakshmi as Allimalar Nachiyar.

It is one among the eleven divyadesams of Thirunangur Tirupathis and is closely associated with Thirumangai Alvar. The temple is open from 8 a.m. to 10 a.m. and 5 p.m. to 7 p.m and has four daily rituals at various times of the day. The Thirumangai Alvar Mangalasasana Utsavam celebrated annually during the Tamil month of Thai is the major festival of the temple during which the festival images of the eleven Thirunangur Tirupathis are brought on mount designed like Garuda, called Garuda Vahana, to Thirunangur.

== Legend ==
The legend of all the eleven temples of Thirunangur are closely associated with each other. As per legend, the Hindu god Shiva in the form of Rudra started dancing in fury at this place after the death of his consort Uma due to the yagna (sacrifice) of Daksha. Each time his lock of hair touched the ground, there were eleven other forms of Shiva who appeared. The celestial deities were worried that if the dance continues, it would result in decimation of entire creations. They prayed to Vishnu for help, who appeared at this place. On seeing Vishnu, Shiva's anger was reduced and he requested Vishnu to appear in eleven forms like he did. On his request, Vishnu appeared in eleven different forms at Tirunangur. The eleven places where Vishnu appeared are believed to be where the eleven temples in Tirunangur are located. It is believed that Vishnu advocated Rudra the importance of Dvadasanamems or the twelve Vaishnava marks in the respective parts of the body. As per another variant, Shiva requested Vishnu to appear in eleven different forms like him to control the eleven Shiva forms he created. The eleven Rudras, called Ekadas Rudras and king of devas, Indra, are believed to have worshiped Vishnu at this temple.

Rama, the seventh avatar of Vishnu came to this place after killing Ravana. He made a golden idol of a cow and gifted to a Brahmin from the ashram of sage Dranethra, from where the place obtained its name. It is believed that Azhagiya Manavalar, the presiding deity at the Azhagiya Manavala Perumal Temple in Trichy came to this place at the request of Shiva. The Brahmin is believed to have built the temple with the gold he obtained and hence it is called Thiruchemponsey (chempon indicated gold in Tamil).

== Architecture ==
Thiruchsemponsey has a small temple complex. It is located in Thirunangur, a small village, 10 km away from Sirkali en route to Thiruvenkadu. The presiding deity is called Perarulalan and is depicted in standing posture facing east. The festival deity, Hemaranngar or Chemponarrangar, is a panchaloha idol housed in the sanctum. The consort of Hemarangar, Allimamlar Thayar is also housed in the sanctum. The shrine of Garuda is located near the altar axial to the central shrine. There is a hall leading to the sanctum, which houses other festival deities.

== Religious significance ==
The temple is revered in Nalayira Divya Prabhandam, the 7th–9th century Vaishnava canon, by Periazhwar, Thirumalisai Alvar and Thirumangai Alvar. The temple is classified as a Divya Desam, one of the 108 Vishnu temples that are mentioned in the book. During the 18th and 19th centuries, the temple finds mention in several works like 108 Tirupathi Anthathi by Divya Kavi Pillai Perumal Aiyangar. It is believed that saint Thirumanagai Alvar visits the place every year to the festival to consecrate the eleven deities. As per local belief, the fresh winds which swirl the paddy fields before the day of the festival indicates a good harvest for the season. As per another legend, the sages Madangar, Domyar, Vyaghrapada and Udangar set up their hermitages in this place. During the period of Mahabharatha, Takshaka, the mighty snake king who killed king Parikshit, ruled the place called Nagapuri, which eventually became Nangur.

== Worship practices and festivals ==
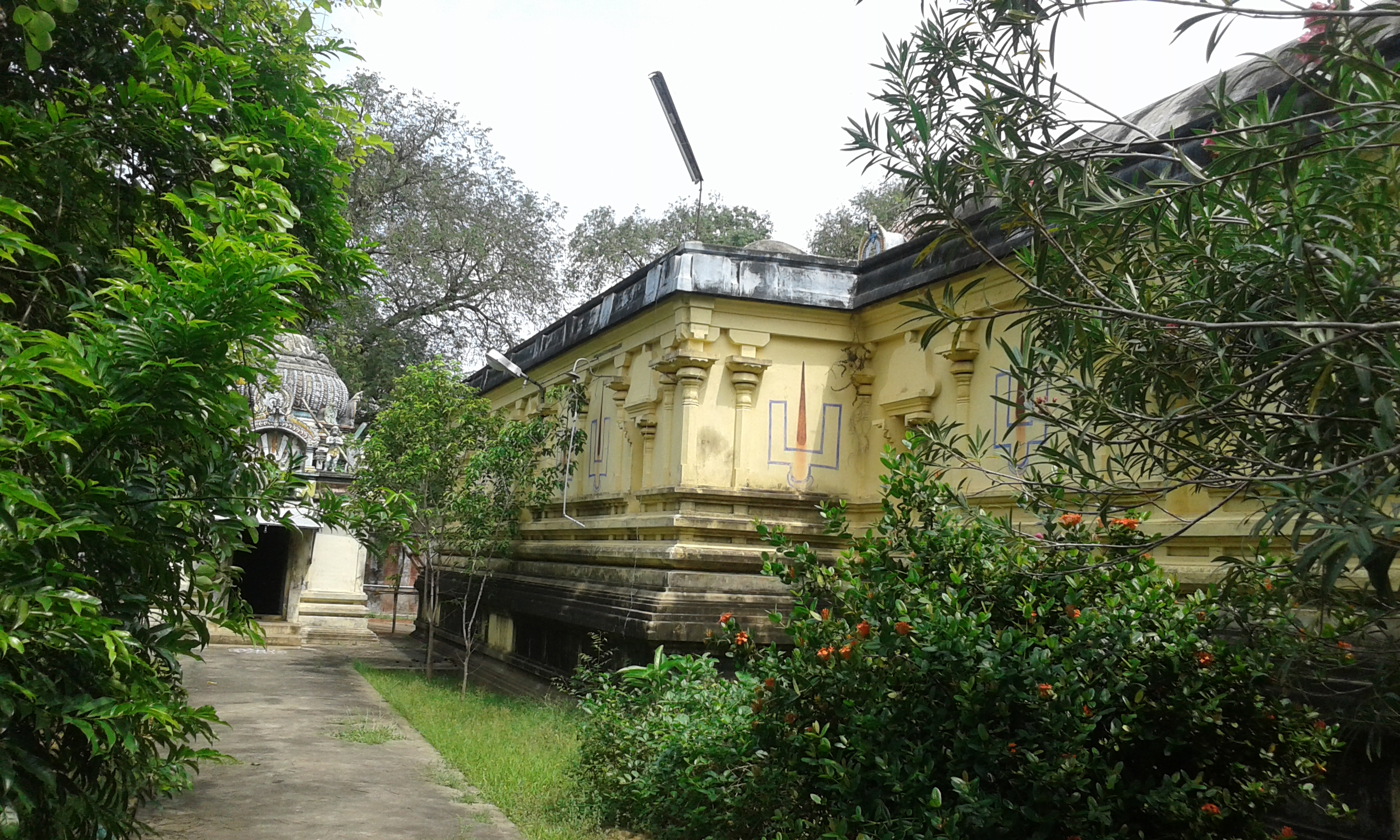
The first precinct of the temple

The temple is open from 8 a.m. to 10 a.m. and 5 p.m. to 7 p.m. The temple priests perform the pooja (rituals) during festivals and on a daily basis. As at other Vishnu temples of Tamil Nadu, the priests belong to the Pancharathra aagama Vaishnavaite community, a Brahmin sub-caste. The temple rituals are performed four times a day: Ushathkalam at 8 a.m., Kalasanthi at 10:00 a.m., Sayarakshai at 5:00 p.m. and Ardha Jamam at 7:00 p.m. Each ritual has three steps: alangaram (decoration), neivethanam (food offering) and deepa aradanai (waving of lamps) for both Perarulaalan and his consort Allimaamalaral Nachiyar. During the worship, religious instructions in the Vedas (sacred text) are recited by priests, and worshippers prostrate themselves in front of the temple mast. There are weekly, monthly and fortnightly rituals performed in the temple. The hereditary honors are received by the descendants of Sri Gomadam Azhagiyasingar family.

During the new moon day of the Tamil month Thai, the festival deity of Thirumangai Alvar is brought to the temple from Thiruvali-Thirunagari. The Thirumangai Alvar Mangalasasana Utsavam is celebrated in the Tamil month of Thai (January–February). The highlight of the festival is Garudasevai, an event in which the festival images of the eleven Thirunangur Tirupathis are brought on mount designed like Garuda, called Garuda Vahana, to Thirunangur. The festive image of Thirumangai Alvar is also brought on a Hamsa Vahanam (palanquin) and his paasurams (verses) dedicated to each of these eleven temples are recited during the occasion. The festival images of Thirumangai Alvar and his consort Kumudavalli Naachiyar are taken in a palanquin to each of the eleven temples. The verses dedicated to each of the eleven temples are chanted in the respective shrines. This is one of the most important festivals in the region which draws thousands of visitors.
