= Thiruppaarththanpalli =

Temple in India

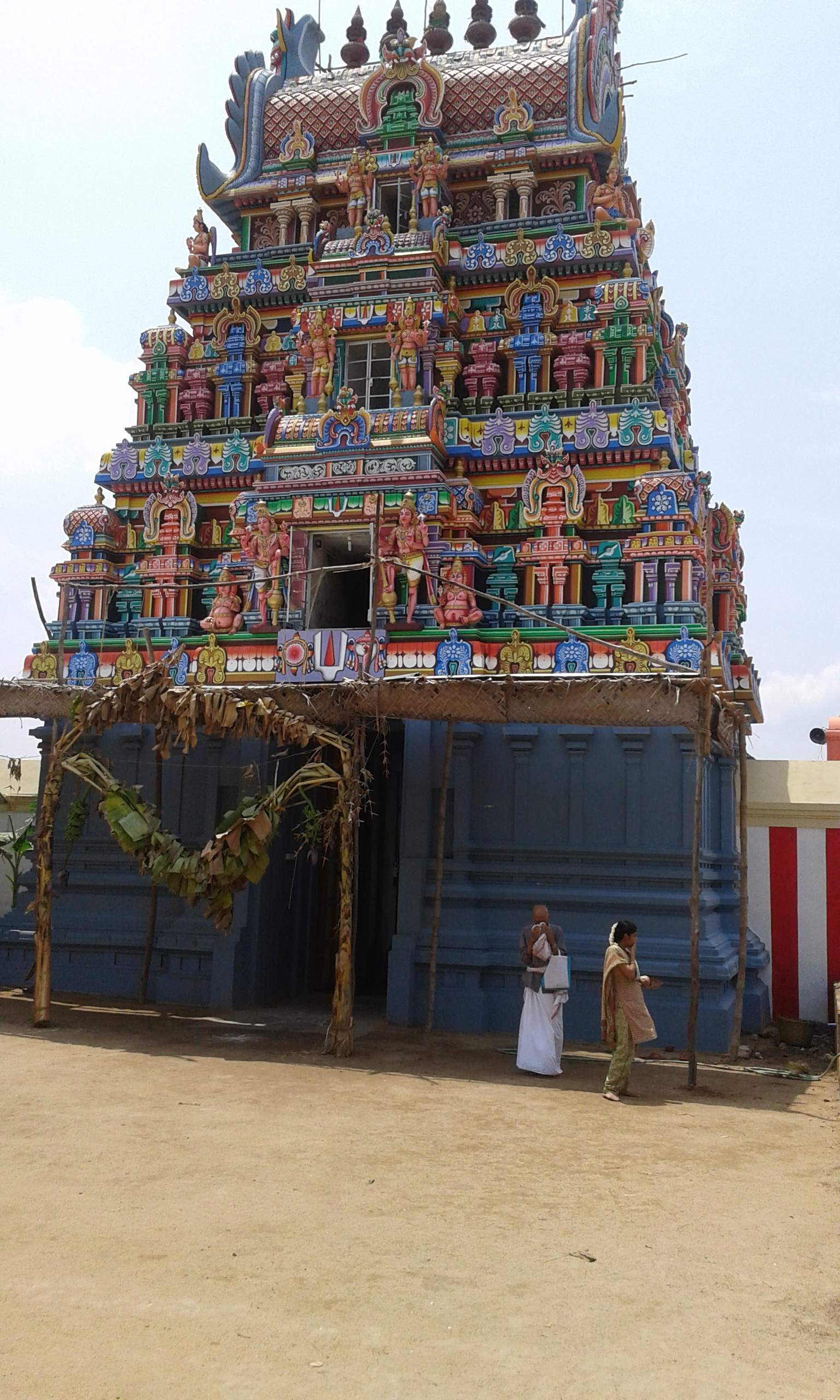

- Location in Tamil Nadu

Religion
- Affiliation: Hinduism
- District: Mayiladuthurai
- Deity: Taamaraiyaal Kelvan Perumal Tamarai Nayagi Parthasarathi
- Features: Tower: Narayana

Location
- Location: Parthanpalli
- State: Tamil Nadu
- Country: India
- Coordinates: 11°10′11″N 79°47′50″E

Architecture
- Type: Dravidian architecture

The Taamaraiyaal Kelvan Perumal Temple or Thiruppaarththanpalli is located close to Thirunangur, a small village, 8 km east of Sirkali en route to Thiruvenkadu and is dedicated to the Hindu god Vishnu. Constructed in the Dravidian style of architecture, the temple is mentioned in the Nalayira Divya Prabandham, the early medieval Tamil canon of the Alvar saints from the 6th–9th centuries CE. It is one of the 108 Divya Desams dedicated to Vishnu, who is worshipped as Taamariyaal Kelvan and his consort Lakshmi as Shegamalavalli.

It is one among the eleven Divya Desams of Thirunangur Tirupathis and is closely associated with Thirumangai Alvar. It is also the only temple in the Nangur Divya Desams to have revered by an Alvar other than Thirumangai Alvar. As per Hindu legend, the temple tank for dug by Arjuna from the age of Mahabharata. Legend says Krishna appeared as Parthasarathy to Arjuna here and initiated his education, leading to the name of the temple.

== Legend ==
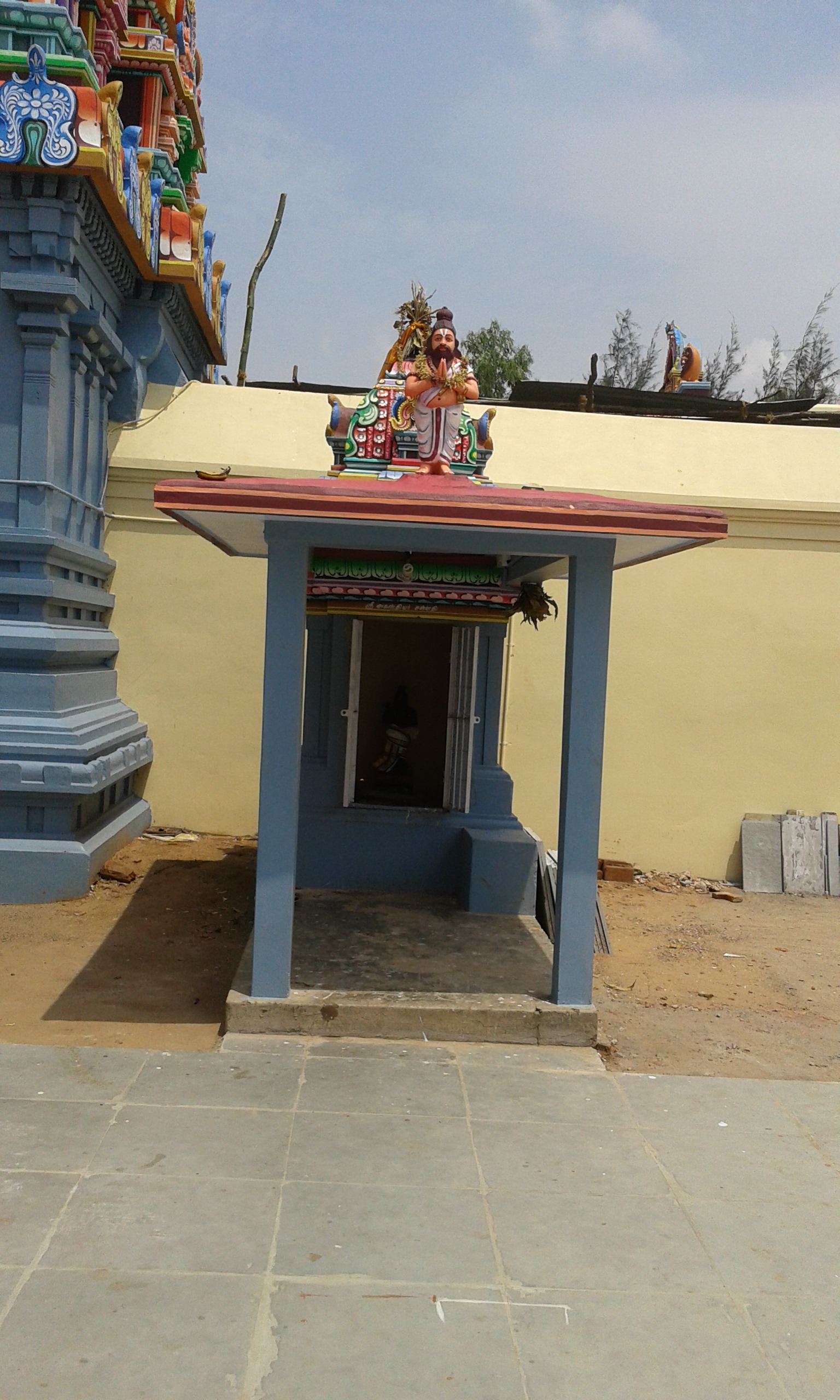
Image of shrine of Agastya

The Padma Purana details the legend associated with the temple. As per Hindu legend, Arjuna, one of the five Pandavas from the epic Mahabharatha reached this place on a pilgrimage. He was thirsty and sought water from sage Agastya who was doing penance. There was no water with the sage and all places around. Agastya realised that it was the trick of the god Krishna, who was the favoured deity of Arjuna. He advised Arjuna to pray Krishna, who did accordingly. Krishna was pleased with the prayer of Arjuna and offered him a sword. Arjuna dug the land with the sword which resulted in a gush of water resulting in the Katka Pushkarani, the temple tank. Arjuna is depicted in the temple sporting a sword, following the legend. Krishna also appeared to Arjuna as Parthasarathy and initiated his knowledge to understand who he actually was. Since Parthasarathy initiated education here for Arjuna, the place is called Parthanpalli. (Parthan + Palli, meaning school).

The legend of all the eleven temples of Thirunangur are closely associated with each other. As per legend, the Hindu god Shiva started dancing in fury at this place after the death of his consort Uma due to the yajna (sacrifice) of Daksha. Each time his lock of hair touched the ground, there were eleven other forms of Shiva who appeared. The celestial deities were worried that if the dance continues, it would result in decimation of entire creations. They prayed to Vishnu for help, who appeared at this place. On seeing Vishnu, Shiva's anger was reduced and he requested Vishnu to appear in eleven forms like he did. On his request, Vishnu appeared in eleven different forms at Tirunangur. The eleven places where Vishnu appeared are believed to be where the eleven temples in Tirunangur are located. It is believed that several sages like Agastya, Bharadvaja, Gautama and Varuna performed penance at this place. It is believed that Ekadasa Rudra, a form of Shiva, worshiped Vishnu at this place.

== The Temple ==
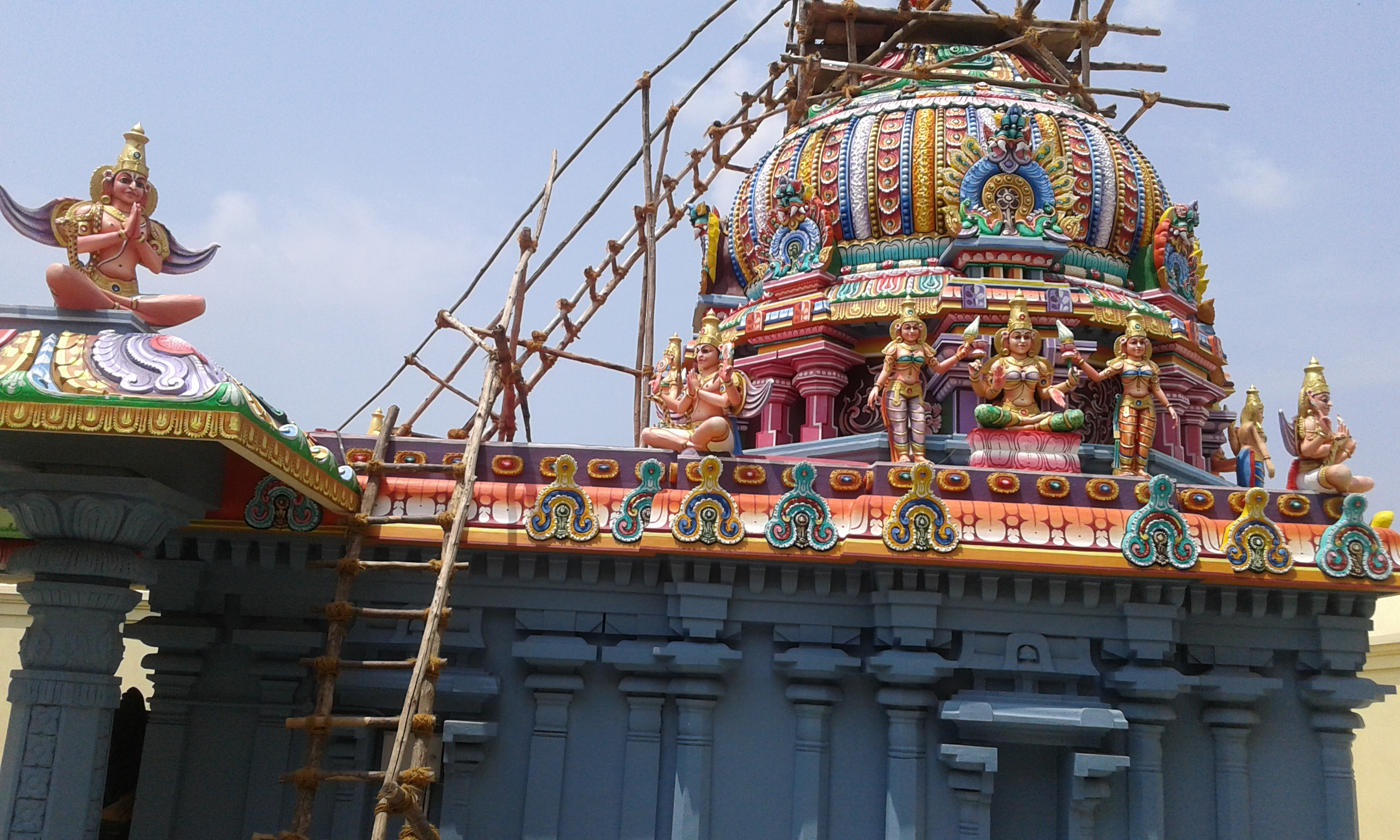
Image of Thayar shrine

It is located close to Thirunangur, a small village, 8 km east of Sirkali en route to Thiruvenkadu. The temple complex has a single prakaram (closed precincts of a temple) and separate shrines for Tamariyan Kelvan Perumal facing west, Shenbagavalli Thayar facing east and Arjuna. The vimana of the temple is called Narayana Vimanam and water body associated with the temple is called Katka Theertham. The festival images of Tamaraiyan Kalvan, Krishna and Rama, are stored in the shrine of Tamarayan Kelvan. This is the only temple where the images of Rama and Krishna are housed in the same shrine. The main gateway tower, the rajagopuram faces west and the temple is surrounded by walls. The temple tank is located in the southern side outside the temple complex. There is a separate hall in the temple complex that houses the chariot and festival chariots. The festival deity has four consorts namely, Sridevi, Bhudevi, Niladevi, and Jambavati. Following the legend of sage Agastya, a separate shrine of Agastya was built during the consecration of the temple in May 2015.

== Festival ==
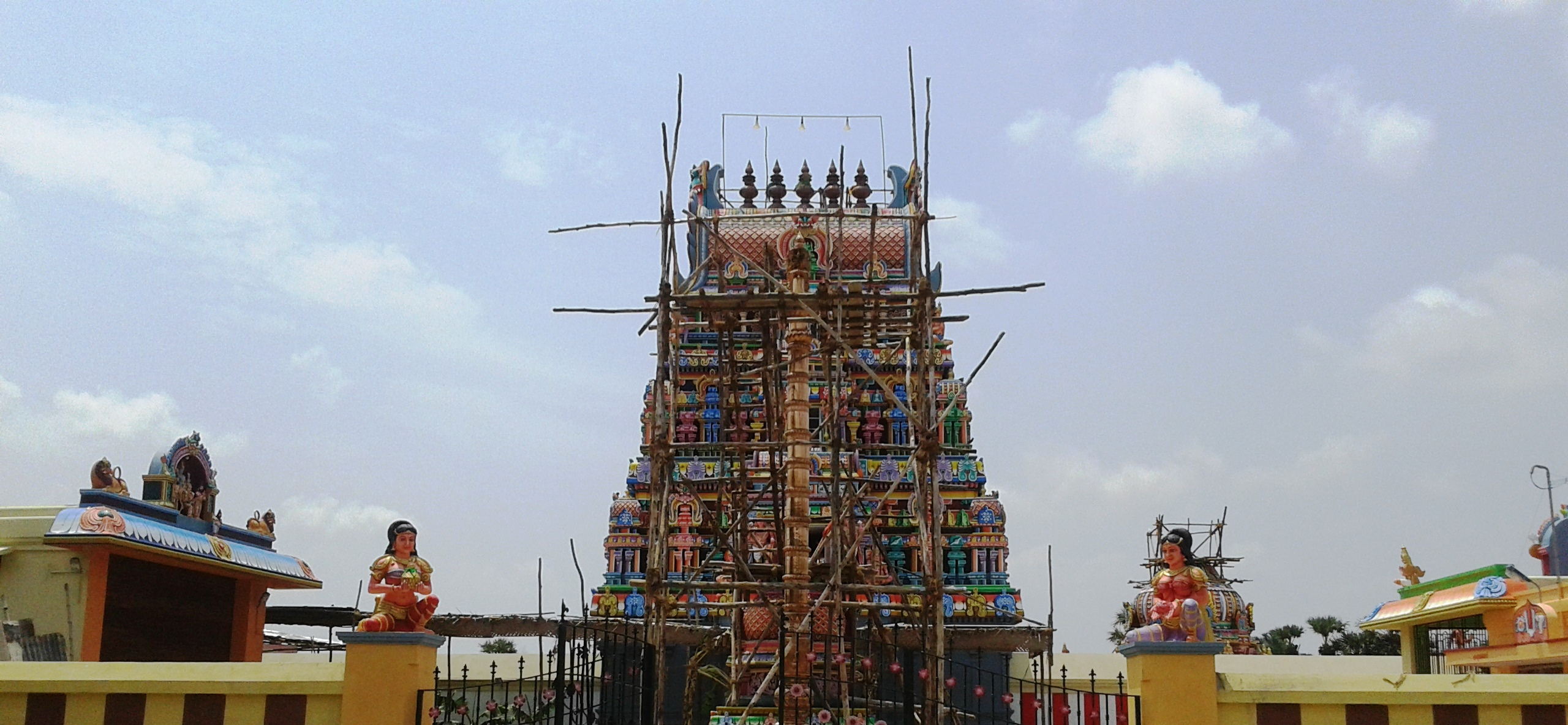
Image of the temple

The annual Theerthavari festival is celebrated during the New moon day of Tamil month of Aadi when the festival deity of the temple is taken in a procession to the sea at Poompuhar. During the new moon day of the Tamil month Thai, the festival deity of Thirumangai Alvar is brought to the temple from Thiruvali-Thirunagari. The Thirumangai Alvar Mangalasasana Utsavam is celebrated in the Tamil month of Thai (January–February). The highlight of the festival is Garudasevai, an event in which the festival images of the eleven Thirunangur Tirupatis are brought on mount designed like Garuda, called Garuda Vahana, to Thirunangur. The festive image of Thirumangai Alvar is also brought on a Hamsa Vahanam (palanquin) and his pasurams (verses) dedicated to each of these eleven temples are recited during the occasion. The festival images of Thirumangai Alvar and his consort Kumudavalli Nachiyar are taken in a palanquin to each of the eleven temples. The verses dedicated to each of the eleven temples are chanted in the respective shrines. This is one of the most important festivals in the region which draws thousands of visitors.

== Religious significance ==
The temple is revered in Nalayira Divya Prabandham, the 7th–9th century Sri Vaishnava canon, by Thirumangai Alvar in one hymn and Poigai Alvar in one hymn. The temple is classified as a Divya Desam, one of the 108 Vishnu temples that are mentioned in the book. It is one among the eleven Divya Desams of Thirunangur Tirupathis and is closely associated with Thirumangai Alvar. It is also the only temple in the Nangur Divya Desams to have been revered by an Alvar other than Thirumangai Alvar. It is also the only one of the eleven to have both Rama and Krishna as festival deities. Poigai Alvar makes a reference about the deity, though not directly about the temple in his works in Tiruvandadi.

== Sources ==
- R., Dr. Vijayalakshmy (2001). An introduction to religion and Philosophy - Tévarám and Tivviyappirapantam (1st ed.). Chennai: International Institute of Tamil Studies.
- T., Padmaja (2002). Temples of Kr̥ṣṇa in South India: history, art, and traditions in Tamilnāḍu. New Delhi: Shakti Malik. ISBN 81-7017-398-1.
