= Thiruthetriyambalam =

Hindu temple in Tirunangur

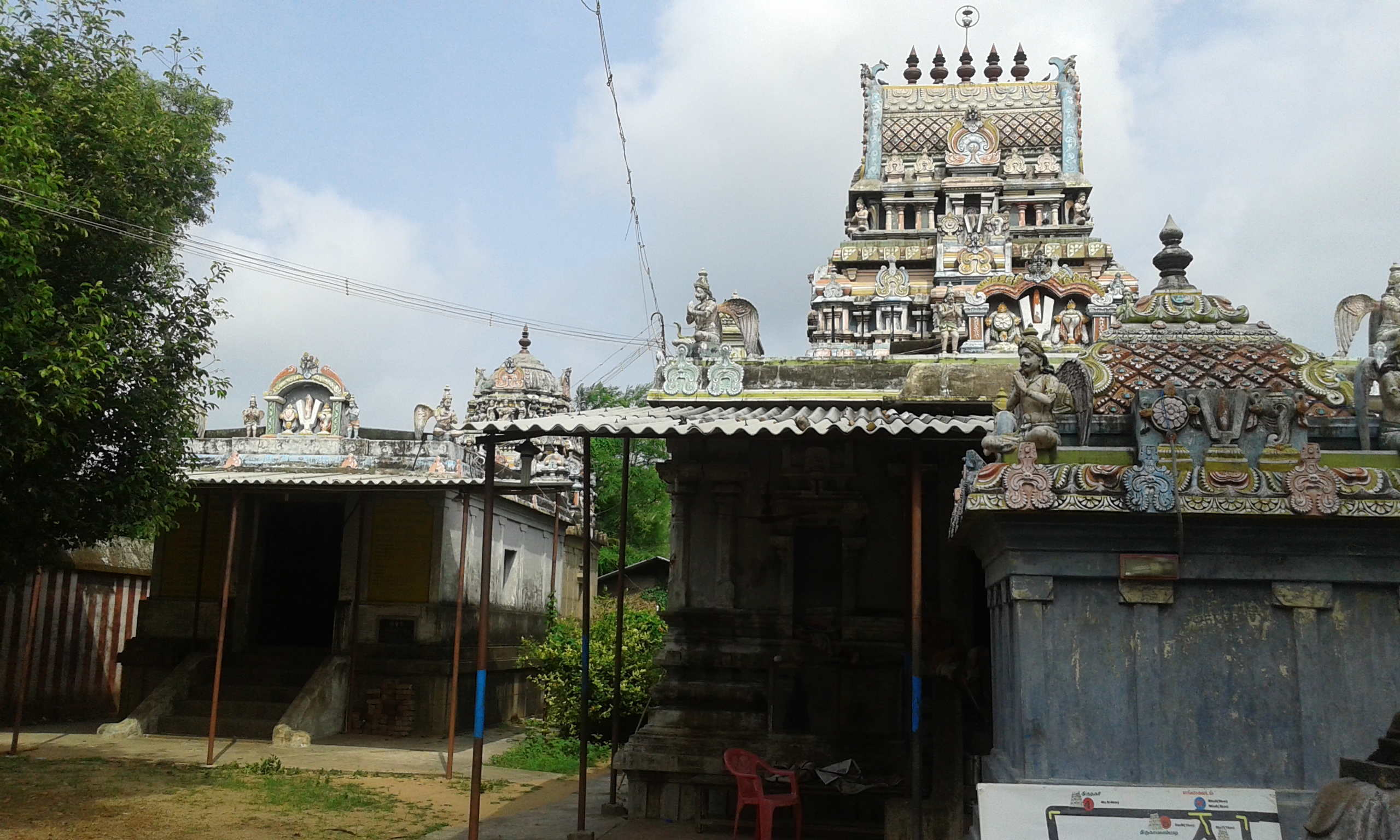

- Location in Tamil Nadu

Religion
- Affiliation: Hinduism
- District: Mayiladuthurai
- Deity: Palli Konda Perumal, Senkanmal (Vishnu) Sengamalavalli (Lakshmi)
- Features: Tower: Veda

Location
- Location: Thirunangur
- State: Tamil Nadu
- Country: India
- Coordinates: 11°10′35″N 79°46′38″E

Architecture
- Type: Dravidian architecture

Thiruthetriyambalam or Palli Konda Perumal Temple is located in Tirunangur, a village in the outskirts of Sirkaḻi in the Indian state of Tamil Nadu, is dedicated to the Hindu god Vishnu. Constructed in the Dravidian style of architecture, the temple is glorified in the Nalayira Divya Prabandham, the early medieval Tamil canon of the Alvar saints from the 6th–9th centuries CE. It is one of the 108 Divya Desams dedicated to Vishnu, who is worshipped as Palli Konda Perumal.

It is one among the eleven Divya Desams of Tirunangur Tirupathis and is closely associated with Tirumangai Alvar. It is also the only temple in the Nangur Divya Desams to have revered by a poet-saint other than Tirumangai Alvar. As per Hindu legend, the temple tank for dug by Arjuna from the age of Mahabharata. Krishna appeared as Parthasarathy to Arjuna here and initiated his education, leading to the name of the temple.

== Legend ==
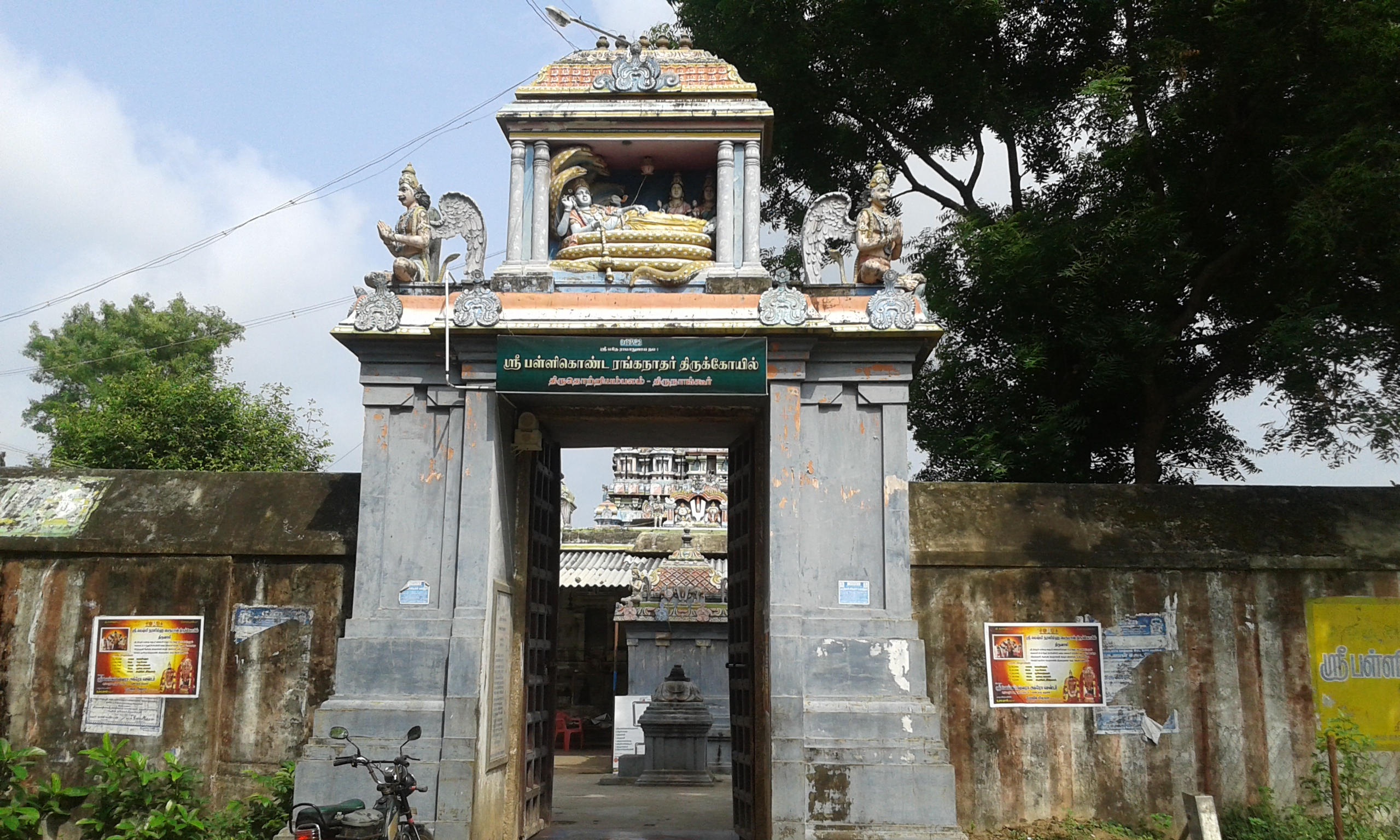
Entrance of the temple

The legend of all the eleven temples of Tirunangur are closely associated with each other. As per legend, the Hindu god Shiva started dancing in fury at this place after the death of his consort Sati due to the yajna (sacrifice) of Daksha. Each time his lock of hair touched the ground, there were eleven other forms of Shiva who appeared. The celestial deities were worried that if the dance continues, it would result in decimation of entire creations. They prayed to Vishnu for help, who appeared at this place. On seeing Vishnu, Shiva's anger was reduced and he requested Vishnu to appear in eleven forms like he did. On his request, Vishnu appeared in eleven different forms at Tirunangur. The eleven places where Vishnu appeared are believed to be where the eleven temples in Tirunangur are located. It is believed that several sages like Agastya, Bharadvaja, Gautama and the deity Varuna performed penance at this place.

It is believed that the presiding deity of Srirangam arrived here on the request of Shiva. It is referred as Ambalam, which in Malayalam means temple. Anandha, the external bliss is believed to have worshiped the presiding deity.

== The Temple ==
The temple complex has a single prakaram (outer courtyard) and a separate shrine for Thayar, the consort. It is located close to Tirunangur, a small village, 8 km east of Sirkali en route to Thiruvenkadu. The temple has two shrines enclosed in a compound wall. The presiding deity, Pallikonda Perumal is sported in Bhujanga sayanam (recumbent posture) with four arms facing east. The presiding deity is called by various names like Senganmal, Ranganathar and Sreelakshmirangar. The shrine of the consort, Bhujangavalli, is in a shrine parallel to the sanctum, facing east.

== Festival ==
The annual Theerthavari festival is celebrated during the New moon day of Tamil month of Aadi when the festival deity of the temple is taken in a procession to the sea at Poompuhar. During the new moon day of the Tamil month Thai, the festival deity of Tirumangai Alvar is brought to the temple from Thiruvali-Thirunagari. The Tirumangai Alvar Mangalasasana Utsavam is celebrated in the Tamil month of Thai (January–February). The highlight of the festival is Garudasevai, an event in which the festival images of the eleven Tirunangur Tirupatis are brought on mount designed like Garuda, called Garuda Vahana, to Tirunangur. The festive image of Tirumangai Alvar is also brought on a Hamsa Vahanam (palanquin) and his paasurams (verses) dedicated to each of these eleven temples are recited during the occasion. The festival images of Tirumangai Alvar and his consort Kumudavalli Naachiyar are taken in a palanquin to each of the eleven temples. The verses dedicated to each of the eleven temples are chanted in the respective shrines. This is one of the most important festivals in the region which draws thousands of visitors.

== Religious significance ==
The temple is revered in Nalayira Divya Prabandham, the 7th–9th century Sri Vaishnava canon, by Tirumangai Alvar in one hymn and Poigai Alvar in one hymn. The temple is classified as a Divya Desam, one of the 108 Vishnu temples that are mentioned in the book. It is one among the eleven Divya Desams of Tirunangur Tirupathis and is closely associated with Tirumangai Alvar. It is also the only one of the eleven to have both Rama and Krishna as festival deities.

== Sources ==
- R., Dr. Vijayalakshmy (2001). An introduction to religion and Philosophy - Tévarám and Tivviyappirapantam (1st ed.). Chennai: International Institute of Tamil Studies.
