= Thiruarimeya Vinnagaram =

Perumal temple in Mayiladuthurai district, Tamil Nadu, India

- Arimeya Vinnagararm
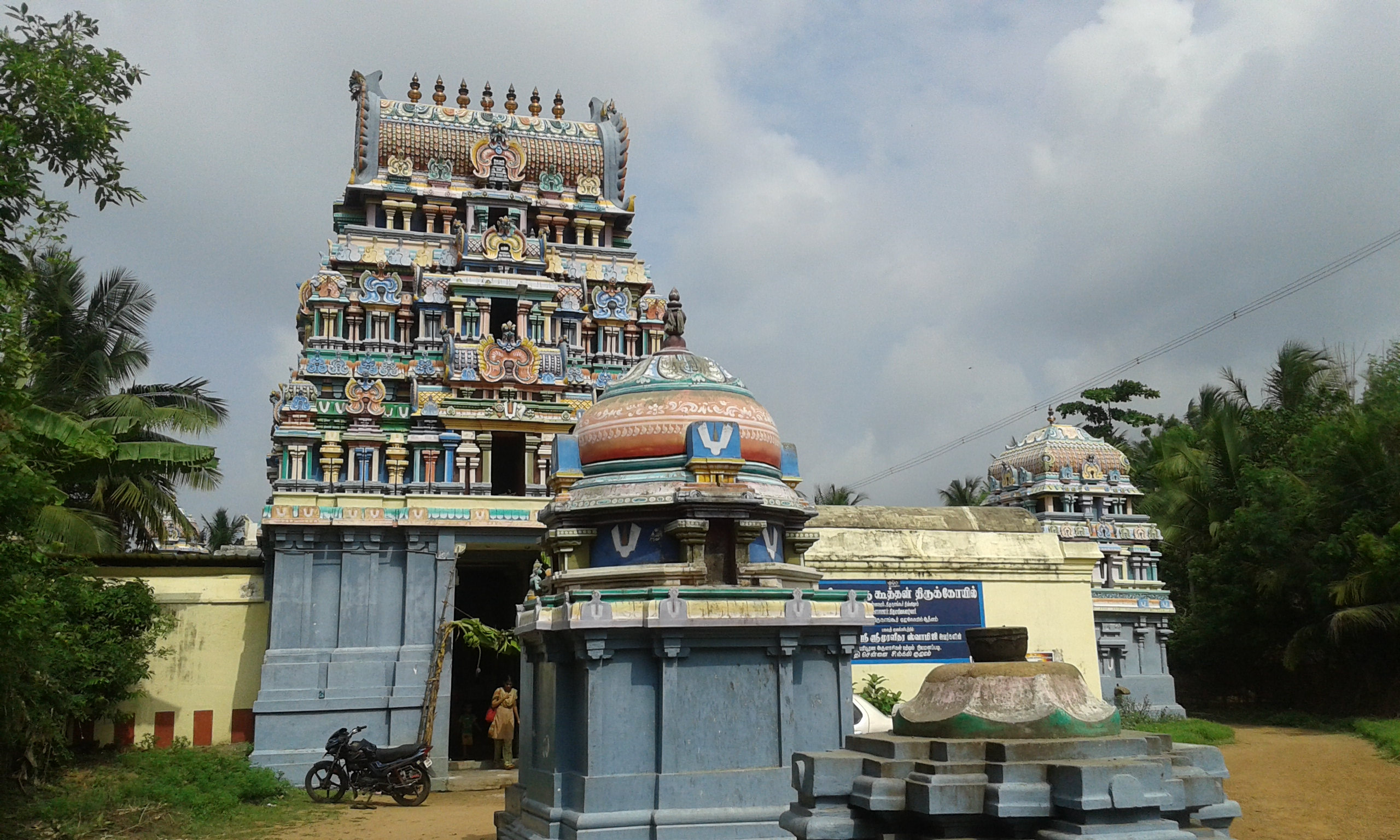

- Location in Tamil Nadu

Religion
- Affiliation: Hinduism
- District: Mayiladuthurai
- Deity: Kudamaadukoothan Perumal (Vishnu); Amirtagadavalli (Lakshmi)

Location
- Location: Thirunangur
- State: Tamil Nadu
- Country: India
- Coordinates: 11°10′29″N 79°46′43″E

Architecture
- Type: Dravidian architecture

Thiruarimeya Vinnagaram or Kudamadukoothan Perumal Temple is dedicated to the Hindu god Vishnu in Tirunangur, a village in the outskirts of Sirkaḻi in the South Indian state of Tamil Nadu. Constructed in the Dravidian style of architecture, the temple is mentioned in the Nalayira Divya Prabandham, the early medieval Tamil canon of the Alvar saints from the 6th–9th centuries CE. It is one of the 108 Divya Desams dedicated to Vishnu, who is worshipped as Kudamudakoothan and his consort Lakshmi as Amirtagadavalli.

It is one among the eleven Divya Desams of Tirunangur Tirupatis and is closely associated with Thirumangai Alvar.

== Legend ==
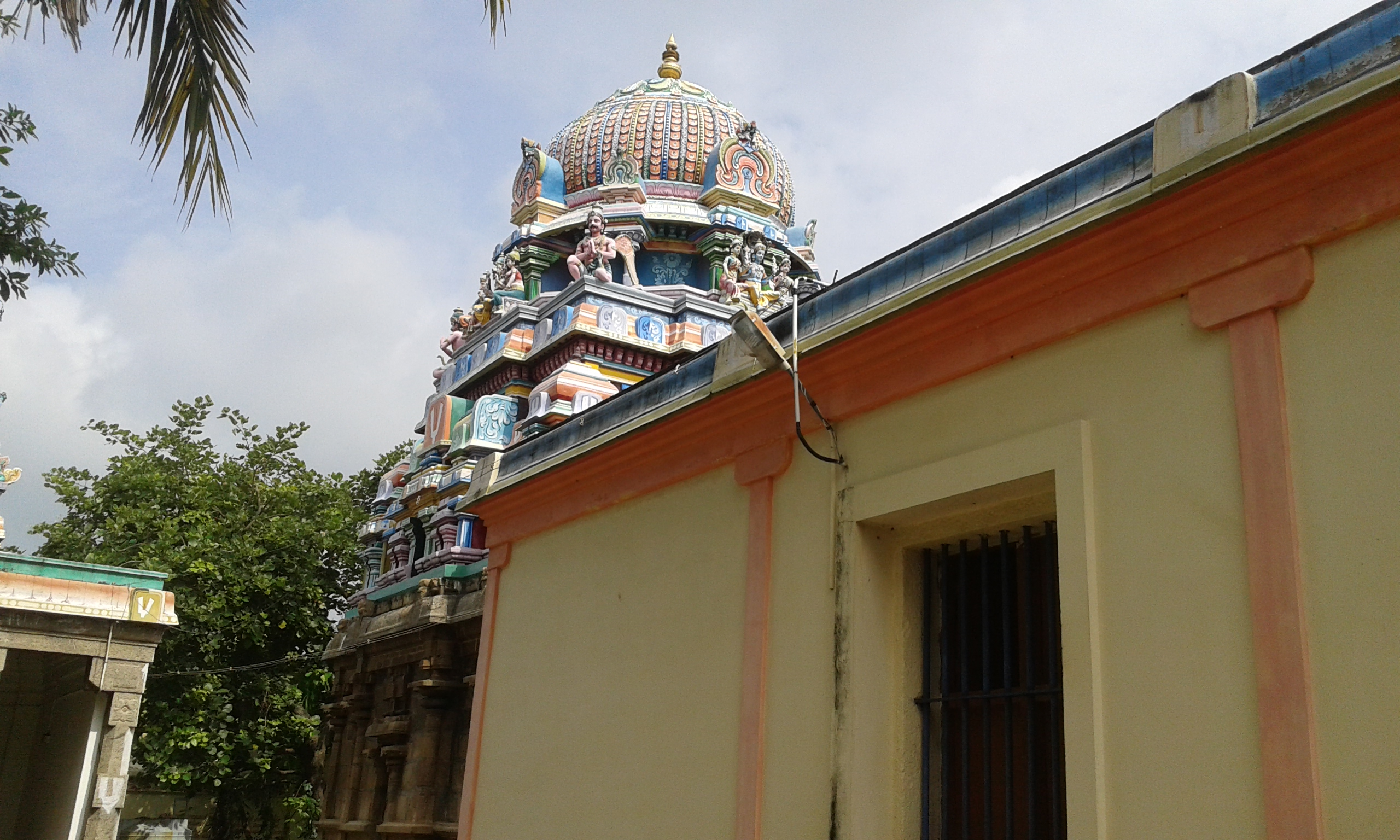
Image of the vimanam

The legend of all the eleven temples of Tirunangur are closely associated with each other. As per legend, the Hindu god Shiva started dancing in fury at this place after the death of his consort Sati due to the yajna (sacrifice) of Daksha. Each time his lock of hair touched the ground, there were eleven other forms of Shiva who appeared. The celestial deities were worried that if the dance continues, it would result in decimation of entire creations. They prayed to Vishnu for help, who appeared at this place. On seeing Vishnu, Shiva's anger was reduced and he requested Vishnu to appear in eleven forms like he did. On his request, Vishnu appeared in eleven different forms at Tirunangur. The eleven places where Vishnu appeared are believed to be where the eleven temples in Tirunangur are located. Arimeya Vinnagaram literally translates to the place where Hari (another name of Vishnu) resides. It is believed that sage Uthanga performed his penance at this place. There is another local legend that Govardana (Vishnu) descended here at the request of Shiva.

== Temple ==
The temple has a 3-tier gopuram. It is surrounded by paddy fields and is located in Tirunangur, a small village, 10 km away from Sirkali en route to Thiruvenkadu. The temple tank is located north of the temple. Sage Uthankar is believed to have worshiped the presiding deity of the temple. The central shrine houses the image of Krishna seated with his legs on a pot. Thirumangai Alvar refers this action and calls the deity "Kudamadukoothar", meaning "Oh, pot dancer". The vimana of the temple is called Vedamodha Vimanam. The presiding deity is sported in seated posture facing east. The festival deity, Gopala, is a panchaloha image sported with four arms and his consort is Amruthakadavalli.

== Religious significance ==
The temple is revered in Nalayira Divya Prabhandam, the 7th–9th century Vaishnava canon, by Periyalvar, Tirumalisai Alvar, and Tirumangai Alvar. The temple is classified as a Divya Desam, one of the 108 Vishnu temples that are mentioned in the book. During the 18th and 19th centuries, the temple finds mention in several works like 108 Tirupati Antati by Divya Kavi Pillai Perumal Aiyangar.

== Festivals ==
During the new moon day of the Tamil month Thai, the festival deity of Thirumangai Alvar is brought to the temple from Thiruvali-Thirunagari. The Thirumangai Alvar Mangalasasana Utsavam is celebrated in the Tamil month of Thai (January–February). The highlight of the festival is Garudasevai, an event in which the festival images of the eleven Tirunangur Tirupathis are brought on mount designed like Garuda, called Garuda Vahana, to Tirunangur. The festive image of Thirumangai Alvar is also brought on a Hamsa Vahanam (palanquin) and his pasurams (verses) dedicated to each of these eleven temples are recited during the occasion. The festival images of Thirumangai Alvar and his consort Kumudavalli Naachiyar are taken in a palanquin to each of the eleven temples. The verses dedicated to each of the eleven temples are chanted in the respective shrines. This is one of the most important festivals in the region which draws thousands of visitors.

== Sources ==
- Ayyar, P. V. Jagadisa (1993). South Indian shrines: illustrated (2 ed.). New Delhi: Asian Educational Services. ISBN 81-206-0151-3.
- R., Dr. Vijayalakshmy (2001). An introduction to religion and Philosophy - Tévarám and Tivviyappirapantam (1st ed.). Chennai: International Institute of Tamil Studies.
- T., Padmaja (2002). Temples of Kr̥ṣṇa in South India: history, art, and traditions in Tamilnāḍu. New Delhi: Shakti Malik. ISBN 81-7017-398-1.
