= Annan Koil =

Village in Tamil Nadu, India

Coordinates: 11.1775°N 79.7792°E

Annan Koil is a village near Sirkazhi in Mayiladuthurai district of Tamil Nadu, (South India). The village is irrigated by the river Kaveri which flows into the Bay Of Bengal.

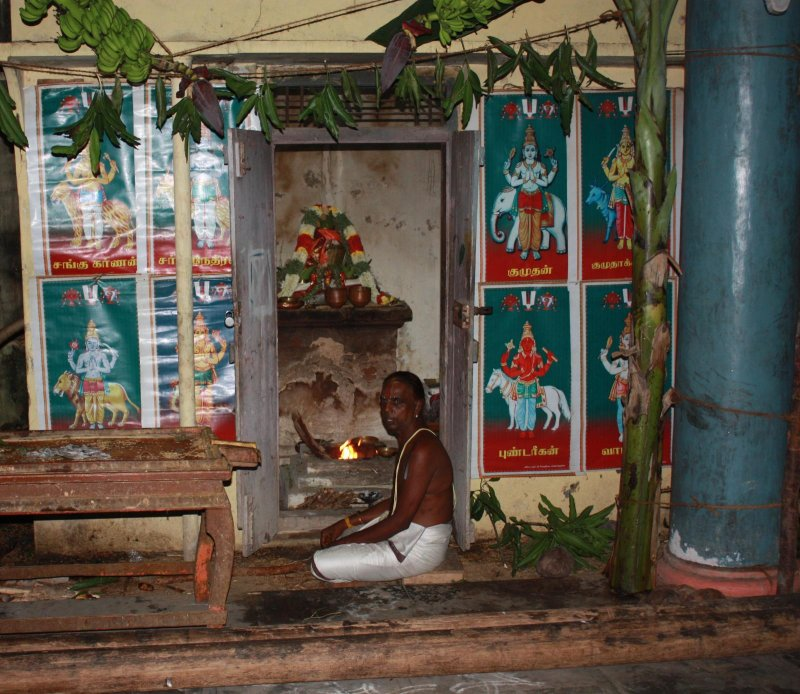
Battachar of Annan KOil

== Location ==
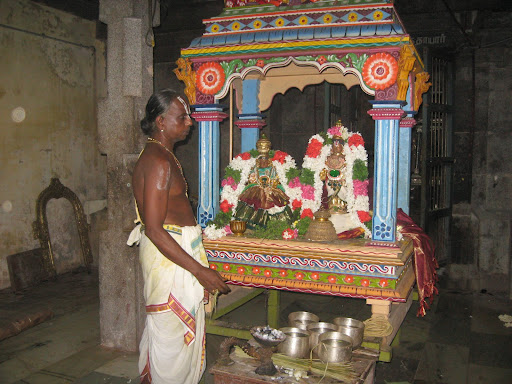
Annan perumal

This village is well connected with roadway NH-45 (Sirkazi to Kaarikal) 7 km from Sirkazi.

== Temple ==
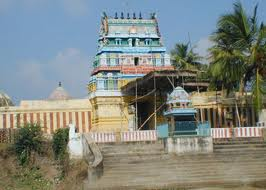
Annan koil

A Vishnu temple, Annan Perumal Koil, is located there. The temple is one of the 108 Divya Desams revered by the 12 poet saints, the Alvars, Tamil followers of Bhakti.
