= Thiruvellakkulam =

Perumal temple in Mayiladuthurai district, Tamil Nadu, India

- Annan Kovil
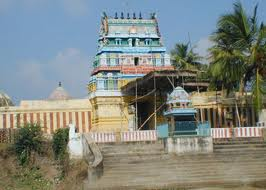

- Location in Tamil Nadu

Religion
- Affiliation: Hinduism
- District: Mayiladuthurai
- Deity: Annan Perumal, Srinivasan (Vishnu) Alamermangai (Lakshmi)
- Festivals: 10 Birmosthavam @ Puratasi Month (Between Sep & Oct) Vasatha Urchnava, Perumal and thayar
- Features: Tower: Tatvatyodaga

Location
- Location: Thirunangur
- State: Tamil Nadu
- Country: India
- Coordinates: 11°11′24″N 79°45′54″E

Architecture
- Type: Chola architecture
- Monument: Adhi Varagam ( Swatha Varaga period)

Thiruvellakkulam (also called Annan Perumal Temple or Annankoil) is a Hindu temple of Vishnu in Thirunangur, a village in the outskirts of Sirkazhi in the Indian state of Tamil Nadu. Constructed in the Dravidian style of architecture, the temple is glorified in the Nalayira Divya Prabandham, the early medieval Tamil canon of the Alvar saints from the 6th–9th centuries CE. It is one of the 108 Divya Desams dedicated to Vishnu, who is worshipped as Annan Perumal and his consort Lakshmi as Alamermangai.

It is one among the eleven Divya Desams of the Thirunangur Tirupatis, and is closely associated with Thirumangai Alvar.

== Legend ==
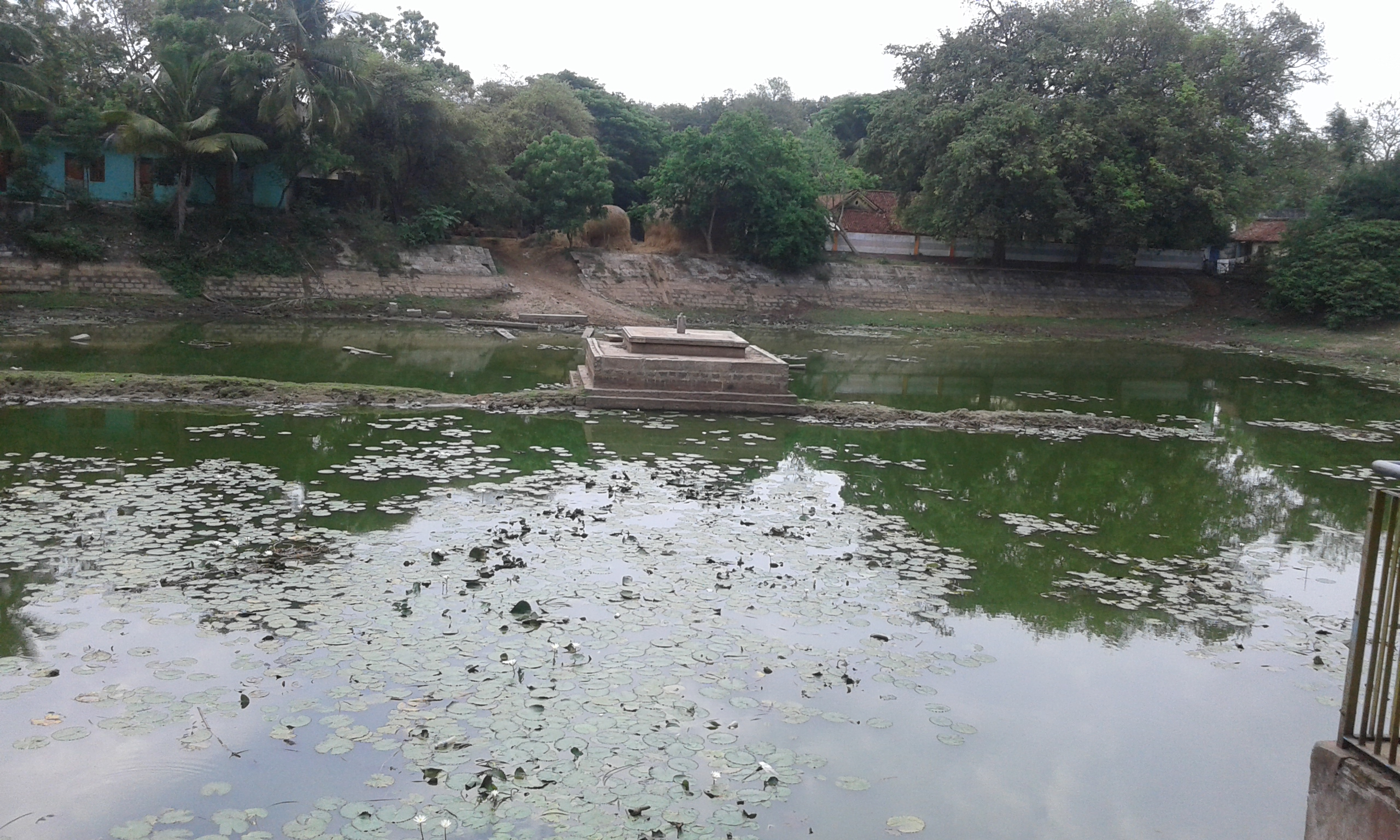
The temple tank opposite to the temple

The legend of all the eleven temples of Thirunangur are closely associated with each other. As per legend, the Hindu god Shiva started dancing in fury at this place after the death of his consort Uma due to the yajna (sacrifice) of Daksha. Each time his lock of hair touched the ground, there were eleven other forms of Shiva who appeared. The celestial deities were worried that if the dance continues, it would result in decimation of entire creations. They prayed to Vishnu for help, who appeared at this place. On seeing Vishnu, Shiva's anger was reduced and he requested Vishnu to appear in eleven forms like he did. On his request, Vishnu appeared in eleven different forms at Tirunangur. The eleven places where Vishnu appeared are believed to be where the eleven temples in Tirunangur are located.

== The temple ==
The temple has a three tiered rajagopuram and all its shrines are enclosed in a rectangular granite wall. The temple tank is located opposite to the gateway tower. The temple complex has a single prakaram (closed precincts of a temple) and separate shrines for Perumal, Manavala Mamunigal, Nachiyar, and Nammalvar. Kumudavalli Nachiar, the wife of Thirumangai Alvar was found here and she has a separate shrine. There is separate temple in from the Raja goopuram for Hanuman 9 Sri Vijay Anjaneyar). It is located close to Thirunangur, a small village, 8 km east of Sirkali en route to Thiruvenkadu. The temple is also referred as Ten Tirupati (Southern Tirupati) and has same structure as Tirupati temple. The latest Samprokshanam of the temple was performed during October 2016.

== Religious significance ==
The temple is mentioned in Nalayira Divya Prabhandam, the 7th–9th century Vaishnava canon, by Thirumangai Alvar. The temple is classified as a Divya Desam, one of the 108 Vishnu temples that are mentioned in the book. During the 18th and 19th centuries, the temple was mentioned in several works like 108 Tirupati Antati by Divya Kavi Pillai Perumal Aiyangar. It is believed that king Svetharaju in the line of Ikshvaku dynasty worshiped the presiding deity.

== Worship practices and festivals ==
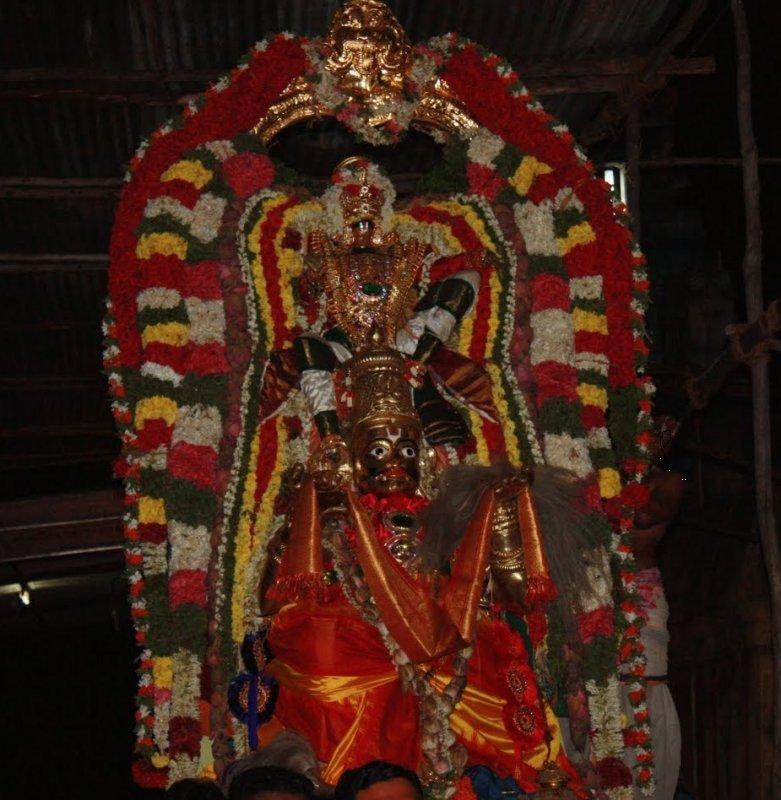
Image of the festival deity

During the new moon day of the Tamil month Tai, the festival deity of Thirumangai Alvar is brought to the temple from Thiruvali-Thirunagari. The Thirumangai Alvar Mangalasasana Utsavam is celebrated in the Tamil month of Tai (January–February). The highlight of the festival is Garudasevai, an event in which the festival images of the eleven Thirunangur Tirupatis are brought on mount designed like Garuda, called Garuda Vahana, to Thirunangur. The festive image of Thirumangai Alvar is also brought on a Hamsa Vahanam (palanquin) and his pasurams (verses) dedicated to each of these eleven temples are recited during the occasion. The festival images of Thirumangai Alvar and his consort Kumudavalli Naachiyar are taken in a palanquin to each of the eleven temples. The verses dedicated to each of the eleven temples are chanted in the respective shrines. This is one of the most important festivals in the region which draws thousands of visitors.

== Sources ==
- R., Dr. Vijayalakshmy (2001). An introduction to religion and Philosophy - Tévarám and Tivviyappirapantam (1st ed.). Chennai: International Institute of Tamil Studies.
