= Utsava murti =

Processional idols in Hinduism

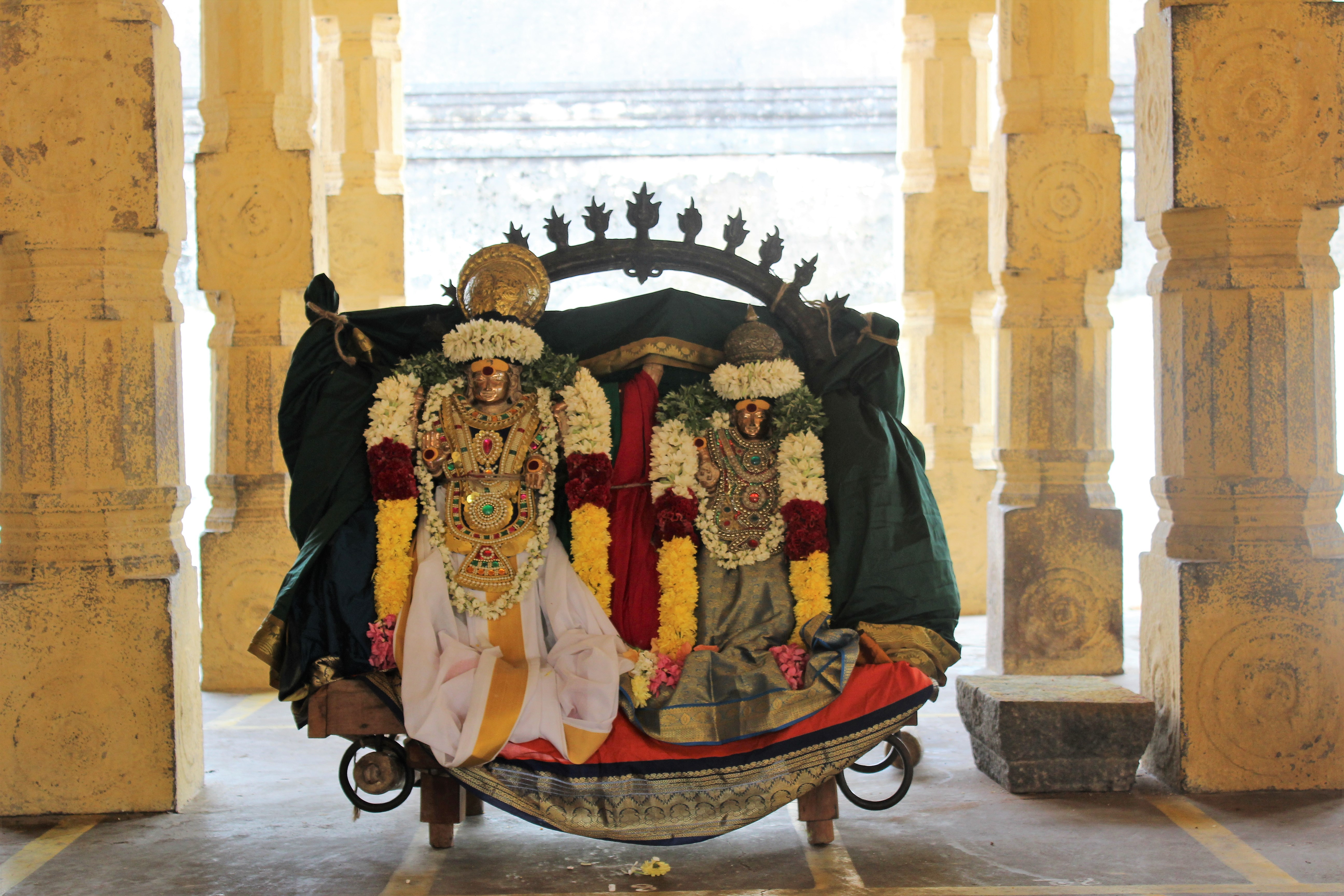
Utsavar of the Abirameswarar temple, Thiruvamathur

In Hinduism, utsava murti, utsavar or uthsavar, is a form of a murti (icon) which represents a deity. The portable utsavar is employed in the tradition of temple processions, serving as a substitute for the central idol present in the temple shrine, called the mulavar.

== Etymology ==
The term utsava is broken down into two root words ut – "removal" and sava – "sorrows." Collectively known as "removal of worldly sorrows." The second term murti means "manifestation of divinity." Utsava murti is also translated as "festival image" or "idol used for procession."

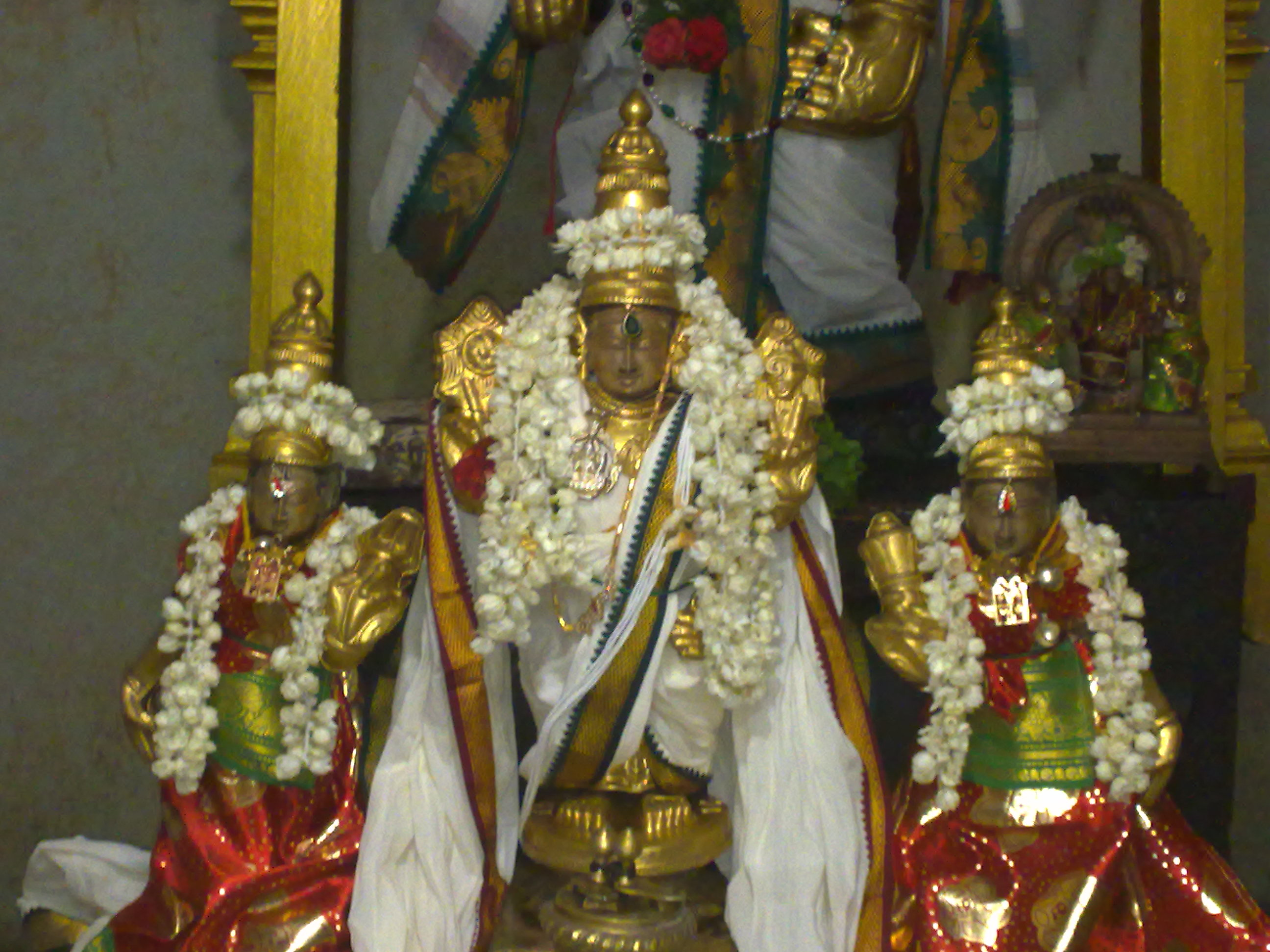
Utsavar of Perumal and his consorts

== Images ==
An utsava murti is generally made of metal, whereas a mulavar murti is usually made of stone. Ablutions are performed on the utsavar images during daily prayer, or during festivals. It is performed in a sequence with various material like milk, curd, honey, and sugar. These are meant to indicate five elemental aspects of earth, and with the ablution, prayers are sought to please the five natural elements. The metal images of utsavar, or the utsava murtis, are usually placed in the sanctum sanctorum during the day time of worship. During the last worship practice, called Ardhajamam in South Indian temples, there is a lengthy proceeding when sacred verses praising the deities are recited. These utsavars are usually made of bronze and stored in the respective shrines of the deities. Panchaloha is a term for traditional five-metal alloys of sacred significance used for making Hindu temple icons. The tradition started from the Chola era from the 7th century, and continues during the modern era.

== Traditions ==
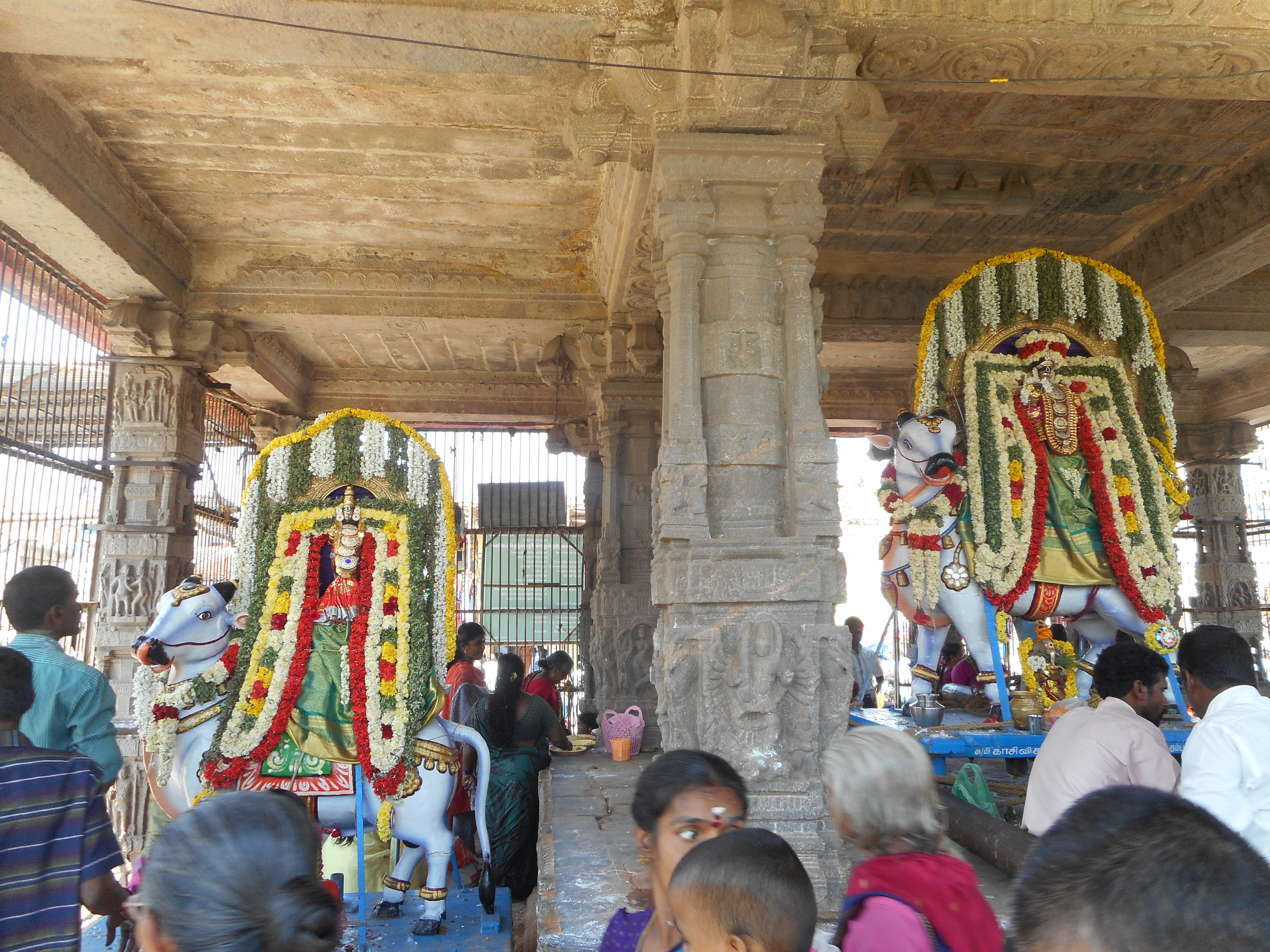
Utsavar images on a mount

The utsava deities are carried upon palanquins, after which the doors of the sanctum are shut. The festive images are carried out in various palanquins or mounts, with figures of a peacock, elephant, Garuda, or large chariots. There are special festivals like Theerthavari, Garuda Sevai, and Sapthastanam, when the festival deities of many temples are placed upon chariots or vehicles to the main temple in the region. Devotees perform various rituals on the festive deities. The utsava deities are taken to a decorated room, anointed with sandal paste, and decorated with silk. After the proceedings, the milk offered to the deities is given to the devotees. Some Shiva temples have swings designed for the images, while some have rooms decorated with mirrors. During the Kumbabhishekam, or the coronation event, the temple is renovated, while the mulavar image is moved to a temporary location. The practice is called Balalayam, during which the festival image takes precedence.

== Festivals ==
Several historic South Indian cities like Madurai, Srirangam, Sirkali, Thiruvarur, and Chidambaram were built around large temples in the center of the city. The streets of the city act as extension of the prakarams (compounds) of the temple. These squares retain their traditional names of Adi, Chittirai, Avani-moola, and Masi streets, corresponding to the Tamil month names, and also to the festivals associated. The temple prakarams and streets accommodate an elaborate festival calendar, in which dramatic processions circumambulate the shrines at varying distances from the centre. The temple chariots used in processions are progressively larger in size based on the size of the concentric streets.
