= Simhavarman =

Simhavarman may refer to:

- Simhavarma
- Simhavarman I
- Simhavarman II
- Simhavarman III
