= Pallava dynasty =

South Indian dynasty (275–897)

- 275–897
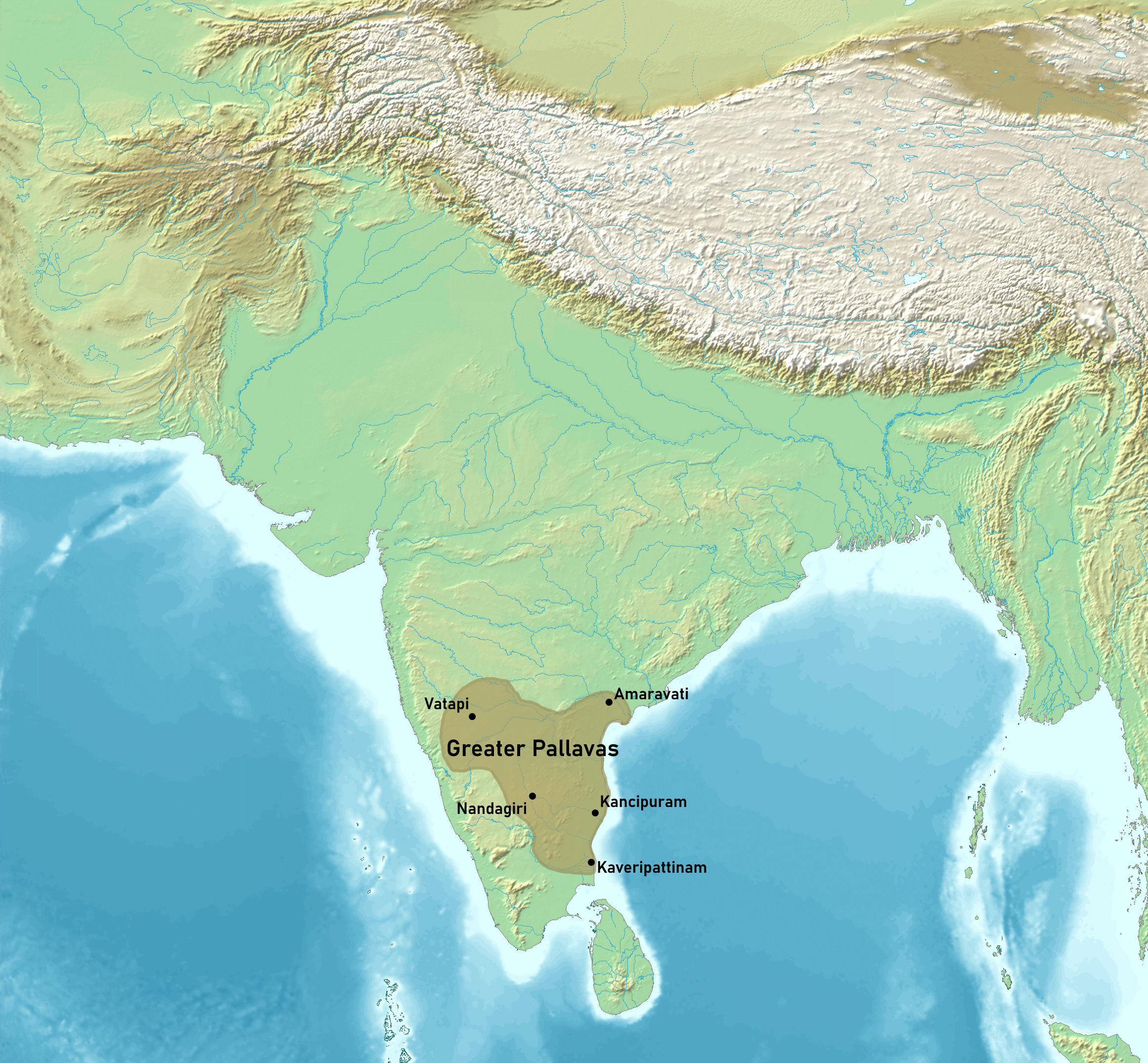
- Pallava territories during Narasimhavarman I c. 645. This includes the Chalukya territories occupied by the Pallavas.
- Status: Dynasty
- Capital: Kanchipuram
- Common languages: Tamil; Prakrit; Sanskrit
- Religion: Shaivism, Vaishnavism, Jainism, Buddhism
- Government: Monarchy
  - 275–300: Simhavarman I
  - 885–897: Aparajitavarman
- Historical era: Classical India
  - Established: 275
  - Disestablished: 897
Preceded by
Kalabhra dynasty
Satavahana dynasty
Succeeded by
Chola Empire
Kadamba dynasty
Western Ganga dynasty
- Today part of: India; Sri Lanka

Pallava Monarchs (3rd–9th Century CE)
- Virakurcha: (Unknown)
- Vishnugopa I: (Unknown)
- Vishnugopa II: (Unknown)
- Simhavarman III: (Unknown)
- Simhavishnu: 575–600
- Mahendravarman I: 600–630
- Narasimhavarman I: 630–668
- Mahendravarman II: 668–670
- Parameswaravarman I: 670–695
- Narasimhavarman II: 695–728
- Paramesvaravarman II: 728–731
- Nandivarman II: 731–795
- Dantivarman: 795–846
- Nandivarman III: 846–869
- Nriputungavarman: 869–880
- Aparajita Varman: 880–897

The Pallava dynasty ruled from 275 to 897 in southern India, including a significant portion of the Deccan and Tondaimandalam. The dynasty rose to prominence after the downfall of the Satavahana Empire, whom they had formerly served as feudatories.

The Pallavas became a major southern Indian power during the reign of Mahendravarman I (600–630) and Narasimhavarman I (630–668), and for about six centuries dominated the southern Telugu region and the northern parts of the Tamil region, until the end of the 9th century. Throughout their rule, they remained in constant conflict with both the Chalukyas of Vatapi to the north, and the Tamil kingdoms of Chola and Pandyas to their south. The Pallavas were finally defeated by the Chola ruler Aditya I in the 9th century.

The Pallavas are most noted for their patronage of Vaishnava Hindu temple architecture, the finest example being the Shore Temple, a UNESCO World Heritage Site in Mamallapuram. Kanchipuram served as the capital of the Pallava kingdom. The dynasty left behind magnificent sculptures and temples, and are recognized to have established the foundations of medieval southern Indian architecture, which some scholars believe the ancient Hindu treatise Manasara inspired. They developed the Pallava script, from which Tamil and Grantha scripts ultimately took form. This script eventually gave rise to several other Southeast Asian scripts such Khmer. The Chinese traveller Xuanzang visited Kanchipuram during Pallava rule and extolled their benign rule.

== Etymology ==
The word Pallava means a creeper or branch in Sanskrit. Pallava also means arrow or spruce in Tamil.

== Origins ==
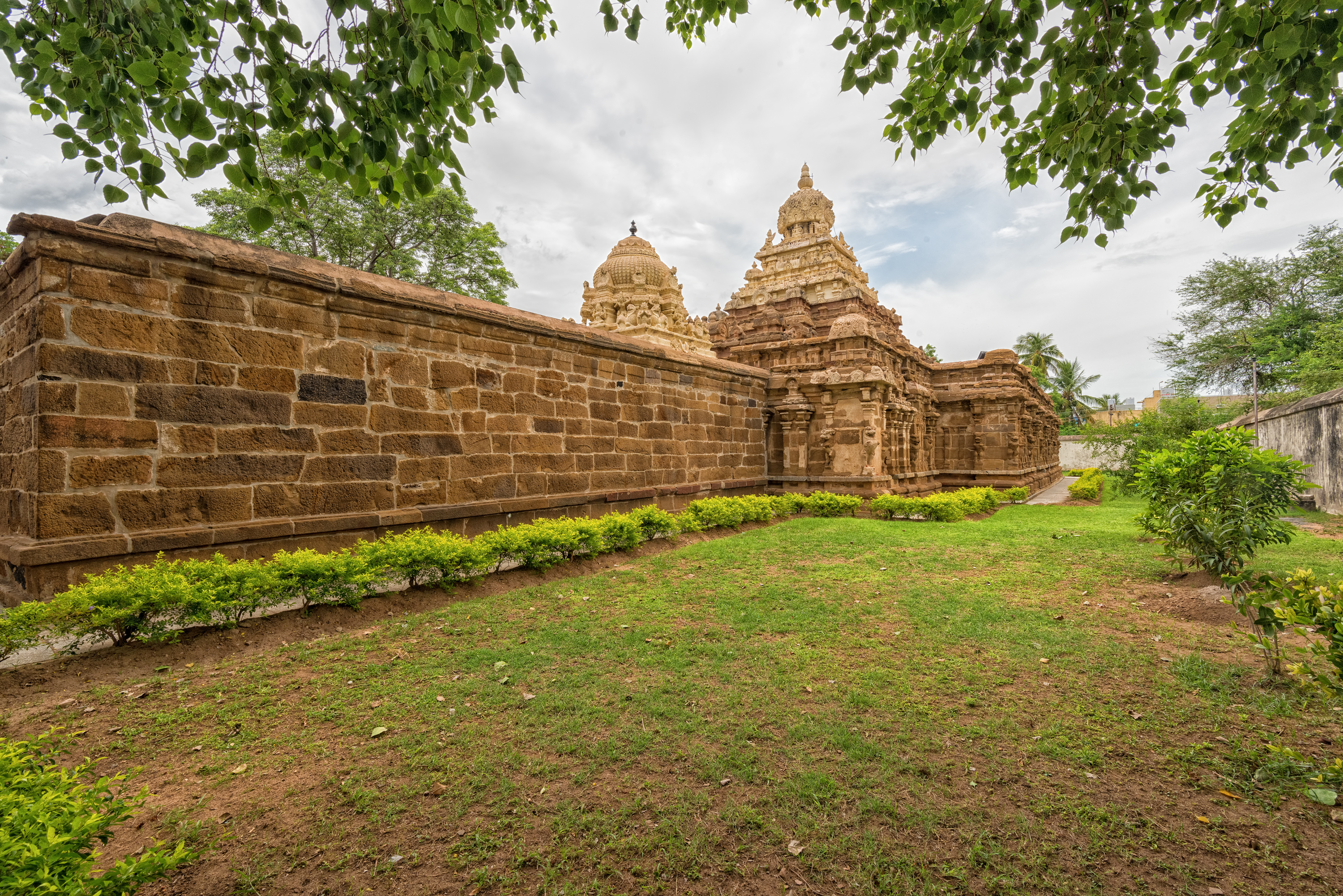
Tiru Parameswara Vinnagaram, Kanchipuram, Tamil Nadu, considered as the oldest temple, glorified in the Naalayira Divya Prabandham, the early medieval Tamil canon of the Alvar saints from the 500 to 800 CE. It is one among the 108 Divya Desams dedicated to Maha Vishnu.

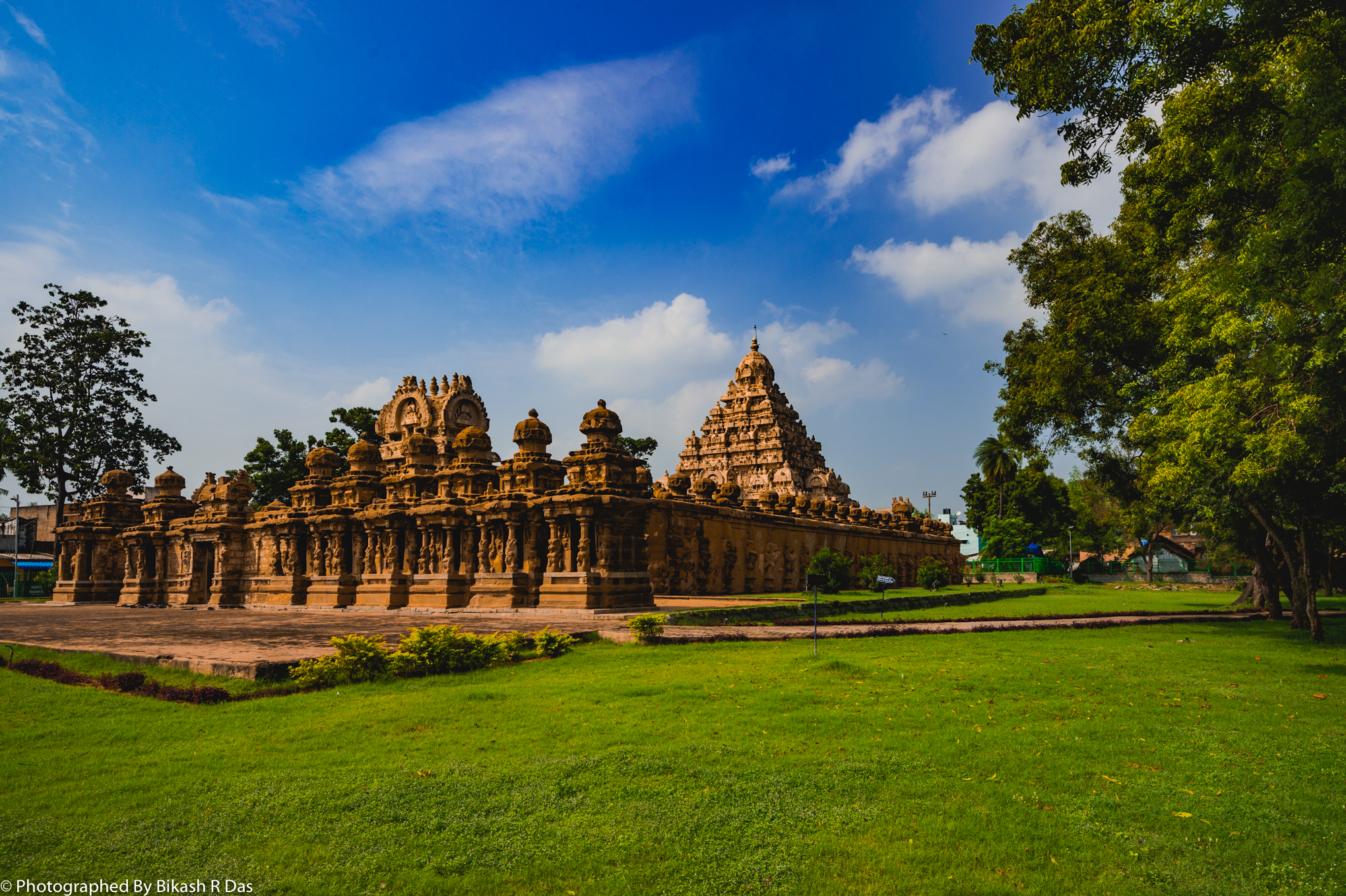
Kailasanathar Temple, Kanchipuram, one of the oldest temples in the city

The origins of the Pallavas have been debated by scholars. The available historical materials include three copper-plate grants of Sivaskandavarman in the first quarter of the 4th century, all issued from Kanchipuram but found in various parts of Andhra Pradesh, and another inscription of Simhavarman I half century earlier in the Palnadu (Pallava Nadu) area of the western Guntur. All the early documents are in Prakrit, and scholars find similarities in palaeography and language with the Satavahanas and the Mauryas. Their early coins are said to be similar to those of Satavahanas. Two main theories regarding the origins of the Pallavas have emerged based on available historical data. The first theory suggests that the Pallavas were initially subordinate to the Satavahanas, a ruling dynasty in the Andhradesa region (north of the Penna River in modern-day Andhra Pradesh). According to this theory, the Pallavas later expanded their influence southward, eventually establishing their power in Kanchi (modern-day Kanchipuram). The second theory proposes that the Pallavas originated in Kanchi itself, where they initially rose to prominence. From there, they expanded their dominion northward, reaching as far as the Krishna River. Another theory posits that the Pallavas were descendants of Chola prince Ilandiraiyan and had their roots in Tondaimandalam, the region around Kanchi. These theories provide different perspectives on the Pallavas' early history and territorial expansion, but the exact origins of the Pallava dynasty continue to be a subject of debate among historians.

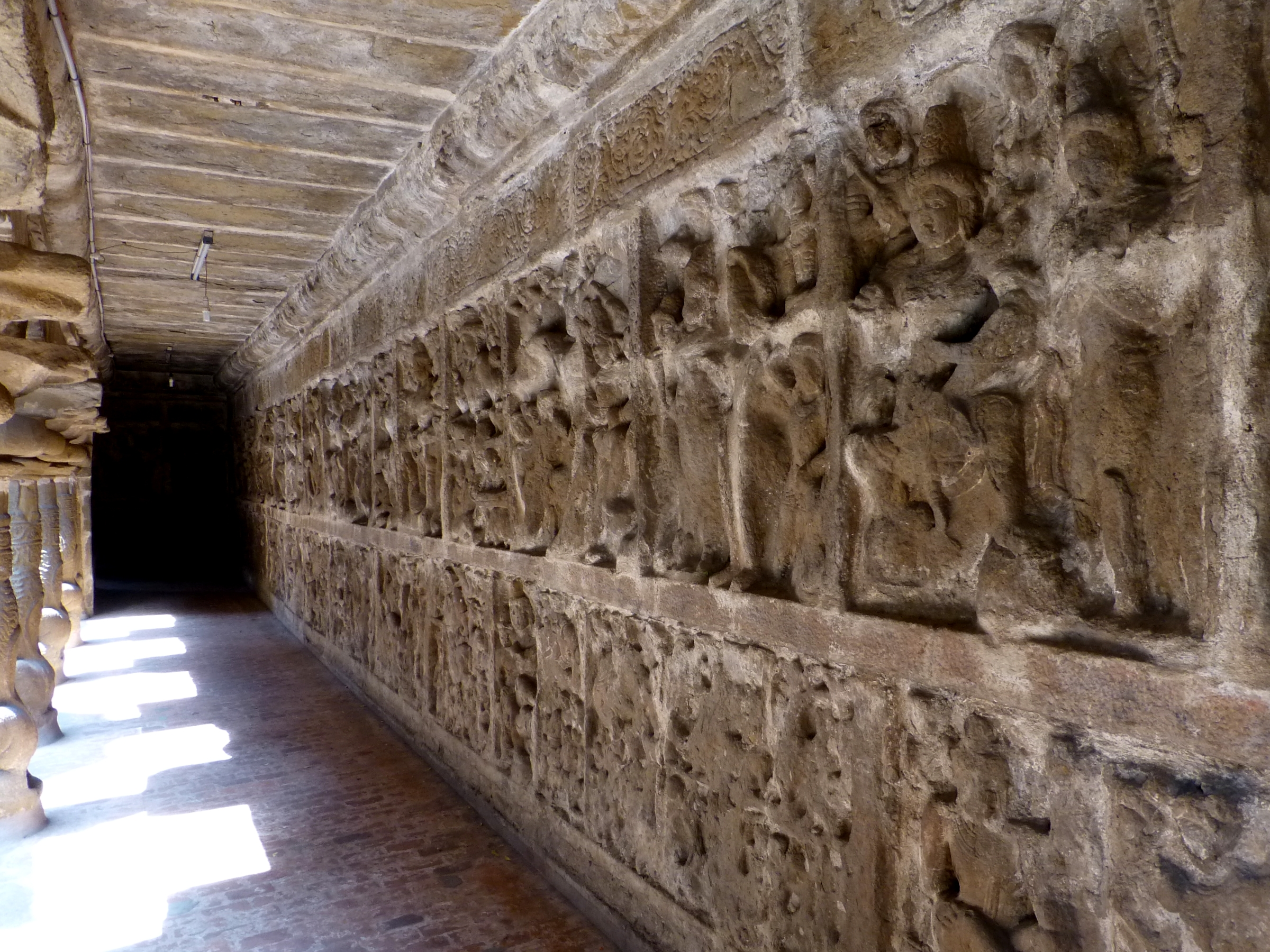
Sculptures of the legends of pallavas in the Vaikuntha Perumal Temple, Kanchipuram

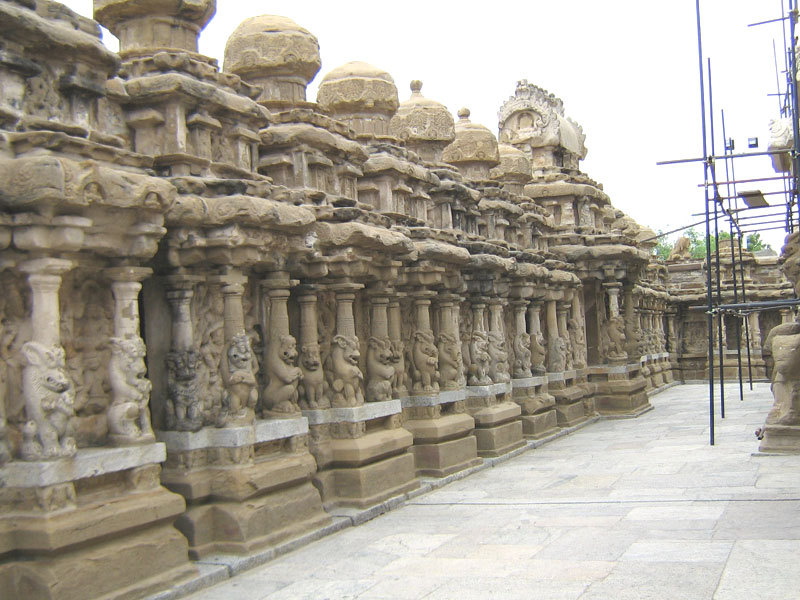
Inner court or the circumambulatory passage with 58 subshrines. Kailasanathar Temple, Kanchipuram

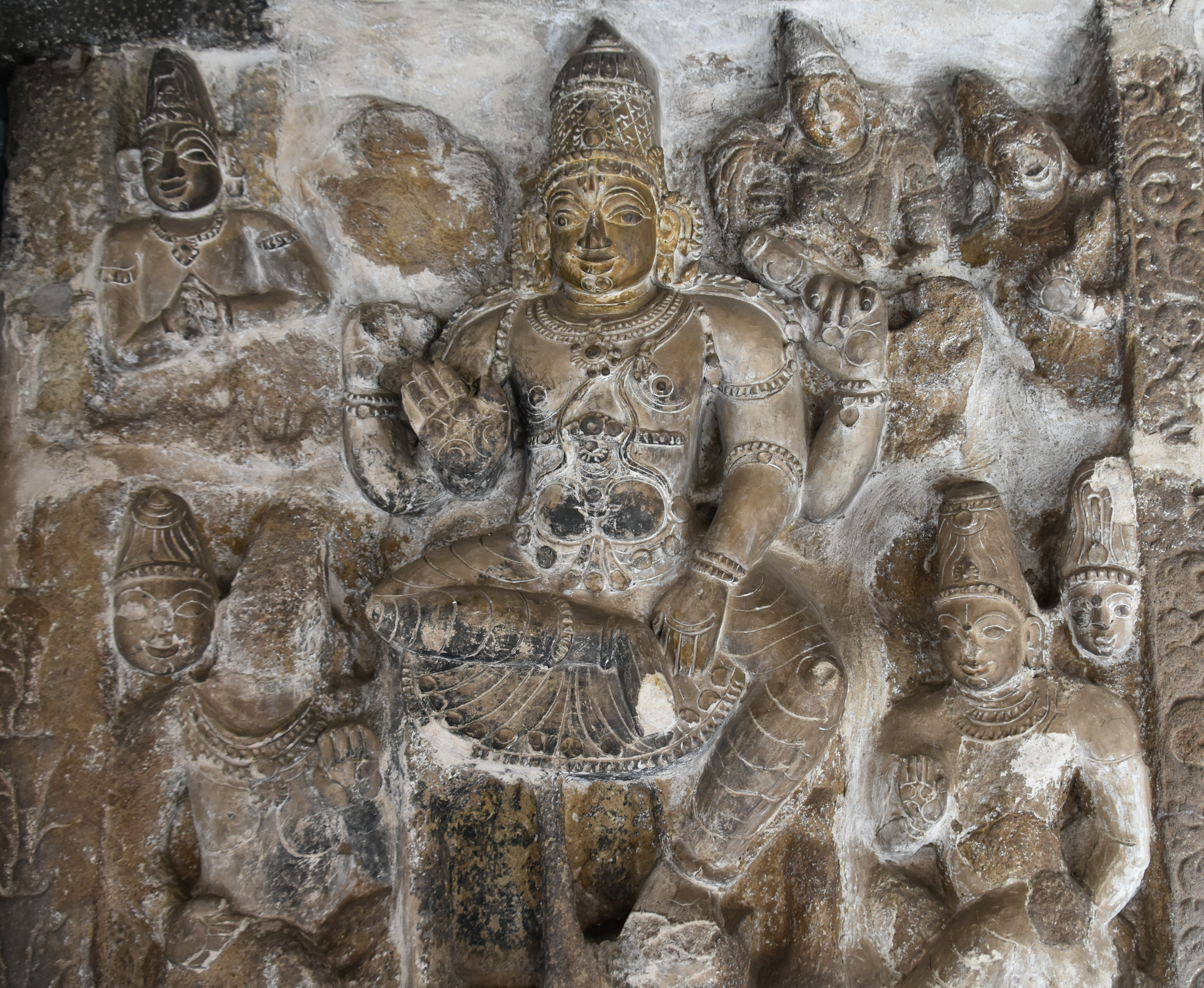
Sculpture of Maha Vishnu as the Supreme deity in Vaikuntha Perumal Temple, Kanchipuram

The proponents of the Andhra origin theory include S. Krishnaswami Aiyangar and K. A. Nilakanta Sastri. They believe that Pallavas were originally feudatories of the Satavahanas in the south-eastern part of their empire who became independent when the Satavahana power declined. They are seen to be "strangers to the Tamil country", unrelated to the ancient lines of Cheras, Pandyas and Cholas. Since Simhavarman's grant bears no regal titles, they believe that he might have been a subsidiary to the Andhra Ikshvakus who were in power in Andhradesa at that time. In the following half-century, the Pallavas became independent and expanded up to Kanchi.

According to historian N. Subramanian, the Tamil origin theory of the Pallavas is considered plausible based on literary and historical evidence. He states that a tribe called the Thirayar lived in the Vengadam region in northeastern Tamil Nadu and they are mentioned in Sangam literature such as Ahananuru. It is also believed that another group called the Thondaiyar from the Aruvanadu region may have been related to the Thirayars. It is suggested that there was migration and interaction between these groups, which may have been accelerated by Karikala Chola's invasions of Thondaimandala. As a result, settlements may have formed in the vicinity of Kanchi and later these groups may have merged. He believes that this hybridity may have led to the origin of the Pallavas. He also explains that words like "Ilanthiraiyar" found in Sangam literature may not be the names of individual people, but may be a generic name denoting a position or clan identity. Thus, it is believed that the Theriyas and their associated groups may have played an important role in the political system of the region, and that the Pallavas may have emerged from this type of local organization. The Culavamsa, the Sri Lankan chronicle, refers to the Pallava ruler Narasimhavarman I by the epithet “Kanduvethi” (or “Kaduvetti”). Some historians interpret this title as linguistically related to the term “Kadavan,” a designation later associated with the Kadava chiefs, and consider it indicative of an connection between early Pallavas with the Kadava lineage.

S. Krishnaswami Aiyengar also speculates that the Pallavas were natives of Tondaimandalam and the name Pallava is identical with the word Tondaiyar. Chola Prince Ilandiraiyan is traditionally regarded as the founder of the Pallava dynasty. Ilandiraiyan is referred to in the literature of the Sangam period such as the Pathupattu. In the Sangam epic Manimekalai, he is depicted as the son of Chola king Killi and the Naga princess Pilivalai, the daughter of king Valaivanan of Manipallavam.

Another theory is propounded by historians R. Sathianathaier and D. C. Sircar, with endorsements by Hermann Kulke, Dietmar Rothermund and Burton Stein. Sircar points out that the family legends of the Pallavas speak of an ancestor descending from Ashwatthama, the legendary warrior of Mahabharata, and his union with a Naga princess. According to Ptolemy, the Aruvanadu region between the northern and southern Penner rivers (Penna and Ponnaiyar) was ruled by a king Basaronaga around 140 CE. By marrying into this Naga family, the Pallavas would have acquired control of the region near Kanchi. While Sircar allows that Pallavas might have been provincial rulers under the later Satavahanas with a partial northern lineage, Sathianathaier sees them as natives of Tondaimandalam (the core region of Aruvanadu). He argues that they could well have adopted northern Indian practices under the Mauryan Asoka's rule. He relates the name "Pallava" to Pulindas, whose heritage is borne by names such as "Pulinadu" and "Puliyurkottam" in the region.

According to Sir H. A. Stuart the Pallavas were Kurumbas and Kurubas their modern representatives. This is supported by Marathi historian R. C. Dhere who stated that Pallavas were originally pastoralists that belonged to Kuruba lineages. The territory of Pallavas was bordered by the Coromandel Coast along present Tamil Nadu and southern Andhra Pradesh. Out of the coins found here, the class of gold and silver coins belonging to the 2nd-7th century CE period contain the Pallava emblem, the maned lion, together with Kannada or Sanskrit inscription which showed that the Pallavas used Kannada too in their administration along with Prakrit, Sanskrit and Tamil.

The Mahakuta Pillar inscription of Kirttivarman I claims that Dramila term to describe Pallavas. "Dramila" is a term, often used interchangeably with "Dravida," referring to the ancient Tamil kingdoms and their people) Kadavas were related to the Pallava dynasty and ruled from Kudalur near Cuddalore in Tamil Nadu. Hiranyavarman, the father of Nandivarman II Pallavamalla is said to have belonged to the Kadavakula in epigraphs. The title Kadava is found among the several titles assumed by Mahendravarman I, Narasimhavarman I and Narasimhavarman II. It describe the Pallava kings used the Kadava title. The Kadava name with Kadavarayar is found in Tamil literature to refer to the Pallavas. The relationship of the Kadavas to the main Pallava dynasty is documented in an inscription in Kanchipuram. The kings of the collateral line of the Pallavas who were descended from Bhimavarman, the brother of Simhavishnu, are called the Kadavas. The Pallava king Nandivarman II (Pallavamalla) is praised as "one who was born to raise the prestige of the Kadava family."

== Rivalries ==
=== With Cholas ===
South Asian polities c. 350 CE.

The Pallavas captured Kanchi from the Cholas as recorded in the Velurpalaiyam Plates, around the reign of the fifth king of the Pallava line Kumaravishnu I. Thereafter Kanchi figures in inscriptions as the capital of the Pallavas. The Cholas drove the Pallavas away from Kanchi in the mid-4th century, in the reign of Vishnugopa, the tenth king of the Pallava line. The Pallavas re-captured Kanchi from the Kalabhras in the mid-6th century, possibly in the reign of Simhavishnu, the fourteenth king of the Pallava line, whom the Kasakudi plates state as "the lion of the earth". Thereafter the Pallavas held on to Kanchi until the 9th century, until the reign of their last king, Vijaya-Nripatungavarman.

=== With Kadambas ===
The Pallavas were in conflict with major kingdoms at various periods of time. A contest for political supremacy existed between the early Pallavas and the Kadambas. Numerous Kadamba inscriptions provide details of Pallava-Kadamba hostilities.

=== With Kalabhras ===
During the reign of Vishnugopavarman II (approx. 500–525), political convulsion engulfed the Pallavas due to the Kalabhra invasion of the Tamil country. Towards the close of the 6th century, the Pallava Simhavishnu stuck a blow against the Kalabhras. The Pandyas followed suit. Thereafter the Tamil country was divided between the Pallavas in the north with Kanchipuram as their capital, and Pandyas in the south with Madurai as their capital.

== Birudas ==
The royal custom of using a series of descriptive honorific titles, Birudas, was particularly prevalent among the Pallavas. The Birudas of Mahendravarman I are in Sanskrit, Tamil and Telugu. The Telugu Birudas show Mahendravarman's involvement with the Andhra region continued to be strong at the time he was creating his cave-temples in the Tamil region. The suffix "Malla" was used by the Pallava rulers. Mahendravarman I used the Biruda, Shatrumalla, "a warrior who overthrows his enemies", and his grandson Paramesvara I was called Ekamalla "the sole warrior or wrestler". Pallava kings, presumably exalted ones, were known by the title Mahamalla ("great wrestler").

== Language ==
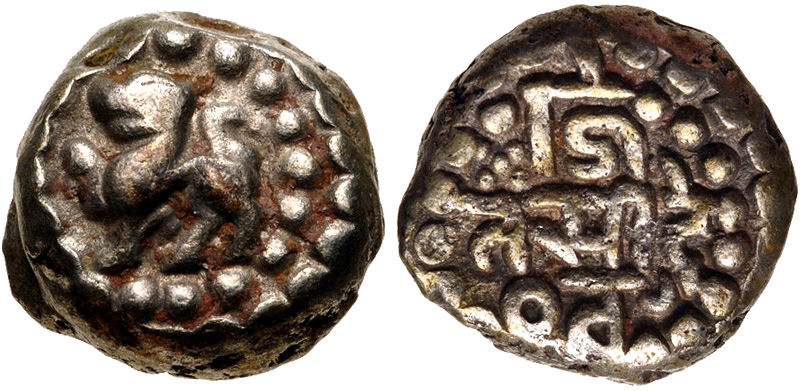
Coin of the Pallavas of Coromandel, king Narasimhavarman I. (630-668 AD).Obv Lion left Rev Name of Narasimhavarman with solar and lunar symbols around.

Pallava inscriptions have been found in Tamil, Prakrit and Sanskrit.

=== Prakrit Phase ===
The earliest Pallava records, such as the Mayidavolu and Hirahadagalli plates, were composed entirely in Prakrit. During this era, the Pallavas functioned as successors to the Satavahana administrative tradition in the Andhra region. The phenomenon of using Prakrit as official languages in which rulers left their inscriptions and epigraphies continued till the 6th century. It would have been in the interest of the ruling elite to protect their privileges by perpetuating their hegemony of Prakrit in order to exclude the common people from sharing power (Mahadevan 1995a: 173–188).

=== Transition to Sanskrit ===
As the dynasty consolidated its power and moved toward a more classical imperial model, Sanskrit emerged as the primary language of literature and high court culture. Sanskrit was widely used by Simhavishnu and Narasimhavarman II in literature. Many Pallava royal inscriptions were in Sanskrit or Prakrit, considered the official languages. Similarly, inscriptions found in Andhra Pradesh and Karnataka State are in Sanskrit and Prakrit.

=== Bilingual Innovation ===
At the time of the time of Paramesvaravarman I, the practice came into vogue of inscribing a part of the record in Sanskrit and the rest in Tamil. Almost all the copper plate records, viz., Kasakudi, Tandantottam, Pattattalmangalm, Udayendiram and Velurpalaiyam are composed both in Sanskrit and Tamil. This move was a pragmatic necessity for governing the Tamil heartland. By using Tamil for the technical details of land boundaries, taxes, and village administration, the state could communicate directly with local Sabhas (councils) and ensure the legal execution of royal orders. The Pallavas in Tamil country used Tamil and Sanskrit in their inscriptions. Tamil was also a language used by the Pallavas in their inscriptions.

== Writing system ==
Under the Pallava dynasty, the Pallava script which is a type of Brahmic script, was used to write texts and it gave ultimately rise for Tamil script via Chozha-Pallava-script and Grantha script. Around the 6th century, it was exported eastwards and influenced the genesis of almost all Southeast Asian scripts.

== Religion ==
Pallavas were followers of Hinduism and made gifts of land to gods and Brahmins. In line with the prevalent customs, some of the rulers performed the ashvamedha and other Vedic sacrifices. They were, however, tolerant of other faiths. The Chinese monk Xuanzang who visited Kanchipuram during the reign of Narasimhavarman I reported that there were 100 Buddhist monasteries, and 80 Hindu temples in Kanchipuram. The semi-legendary founder of Zen Buddhism, Bodhidharma, is in an Indian tradition regarded to be the third son of a Pallava king.

== Pallava architecture ==
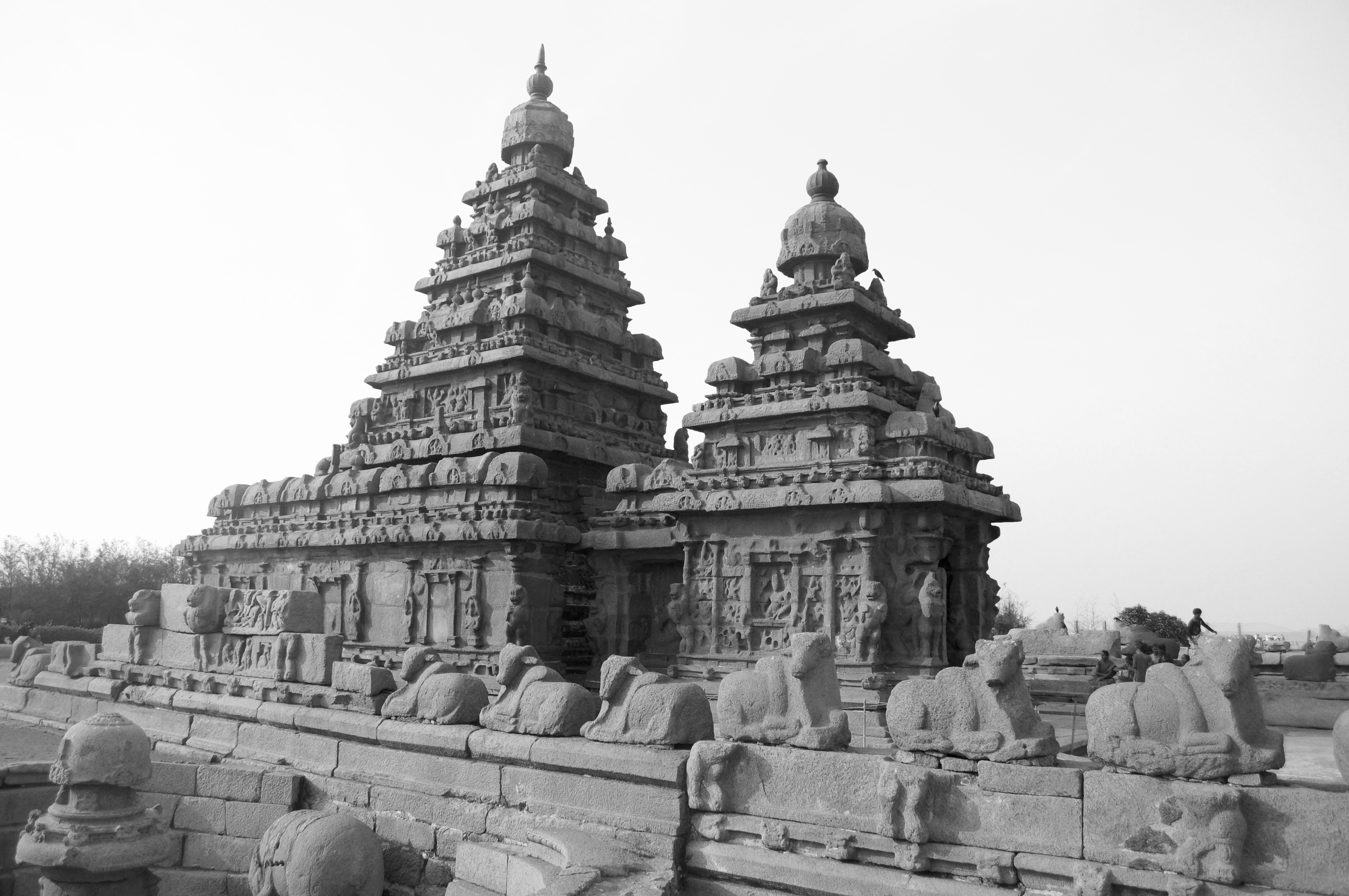
The Shore Temple at Mamallapuram built by Narasimhavarman II

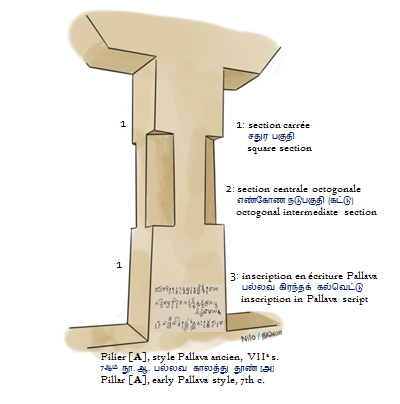
Early Pallava style pillar, 7th c.

The Pallavas were instrumental in the transition from rock-cut architecture to stone temples. The earliest examples of Pallava constructions are rock-cut temples dating from 610 to 690 and structural temples between 690 and 900. A number of rock-cut cave temples bear the inscription of the Pallava king, Mahendravarman I and his successors.

Among the accomplishments of the Pallava architecture are the rock-cut temples at Mamallapuram. There are excavated pillared halls and monolithic shrines known as Rathas in Mahabalipuram. Early temples were mostly dedicated to Shiva. The Kailasanatha temple in Kanchipuram and the Shore Temple built by Narasimhavarman II, rock cut temple in Mahendravadi by Mahendravarman are fine examples of the Pallava style temples. The temple of Nalanda Gedige in Kandy, Sri Lanka is another. The famous Tondeswaram temple of Tenavarai and the ancient Koneswaram temple of Trincomalee were patronised and structurally developed by the Pallavas in the 7th century.

== Pallava society ==
The Pallava period beginning with Simhavishnu (575 CE – 900 CE) was a transitional stage in southern Indian society with monument building, foundation of devotional (bhakti) sects of Alvars and Nayanars, the flowering of rural Brahmanical institutions of Sanskrit learning, and the establishment of chakravartin model of kingship over a territory of diverse people; which ended the pre-Pallavan era of territorially segmented people, each with their culture, under a tribal chieftain. While a system of ranked relationship among groups existed in the classical period, the Pallava period extolled ranked relationships based on ritual purity as enjoined by the shastras. Burton distinguishes between the chakravatin model and the kshatriya model, and likens kshatriyas to locally based warriors with ritual status sufficiently high enough to share with Brahmins; and states that in south India the kshatriya model did not emerge. As per Burton, south India was aware of the Indo-Aryan varna organised society in which decisive secular authority was vested in the kshatriyas; but apart from the Pallava, Chola and Vijayanagar line of warriors which claimed chakravartin status, only few locality warrior families achieved the prestigious kin-linked organisation of northern warrior groups.

== Chronology ==
=== Sastri chronology ===
The earliest documentation on the Pallavas is the three copper-plate grants, now referred to as the Mayidavolu (from Maidavolu village in Guntur district of Andhra Pradesh), Hirehadagali (from Hire Hadagali of Karnataka) and the British Museum plates (Durga Prasad, 1988) belonging to Skandavarman I and written in Prakrit. Skandavarman appears to have been the first great ruler of the early Pallavas, though there are references to other early Pallavas who were probably predecessors of Skandavarman. Skandavarman extended his dominions from the Krishna in the north to the Pennar in the south and to the Bellary district in the West. He performed the Aswamedha and other Vedic sacrifices and bore the title of "Supreme King of Kings devoted to dharma".

The Hirahadagali copper plate (Bellary District) record in Prakrit is dated in the eighth year of Sivaskanda Varman to 283 CE and confirms the gift made by his father who is described merely as "Bappa-deva" (revered father) or Boppa. It will thus be clear that this dynasty of the Prakrit charters beginning with "Bappa-deva" were the historical founders of the Pallava dominion in southern India.

The Hirahadagalli plates were found in Hirehadagali, Bellary district and is one of the earliest copper plates in Karnataka and belongs to the reign of early Pallava ruler Shivaskanda Varma. Pallava King Sivaskandavarman of Kanchi of the early Pallavas ruled from 275 to 300 CE, and issued the charter in 283 CE in the eighth year of his reign.

As per the Hirahadagalli Plates of 283 CE, Pallava King Sivaskandavarman granted an immunity viz the garden of Chillarekakodumka, which was formerly given by Lord Bappa to the Brahmins, freeholders of Chillarekakodumka and inhabitants of Apitti. Chillarekakodumka has been identified by some as ancient village Chillarige in Bellary, Karnataka.

In the reign of Simhavarman II, who ascended the throne in 436, the territories lost to the Vishnukundins in the north up to the mouth of the Krishna were recovered. The early Pallava history from this period onwards is furnished by a dozen or so copper-plate grants in Sanskrit. They are all dated in the regnal years of the kings.

The following chronology was composed from these charters by Nilakanta Sastri in his A History of South India:

==== Early Pallavas ====
- Simhavarman I (275–300)
- Shivskandvarman (unknown)
- Vijayskandavarman (unknown)
- Skandavarman (unknown)
- Vishnugopa I (350–355)
- Kumaravishnu I (350–370)
- Skandavarman II (370–385)
- Viravarman (385–400)
- Skandavarman III (400–436)
- Simhavarman II (436–460)
- Skandavarman IV (460–480)
- Nandivarman I (480–510)
- Kumaravishnu II (510–530)
- Buddhavarman (530–540)
- Kumaravishnu III (540–550)
- Simhavarman III (550–560)

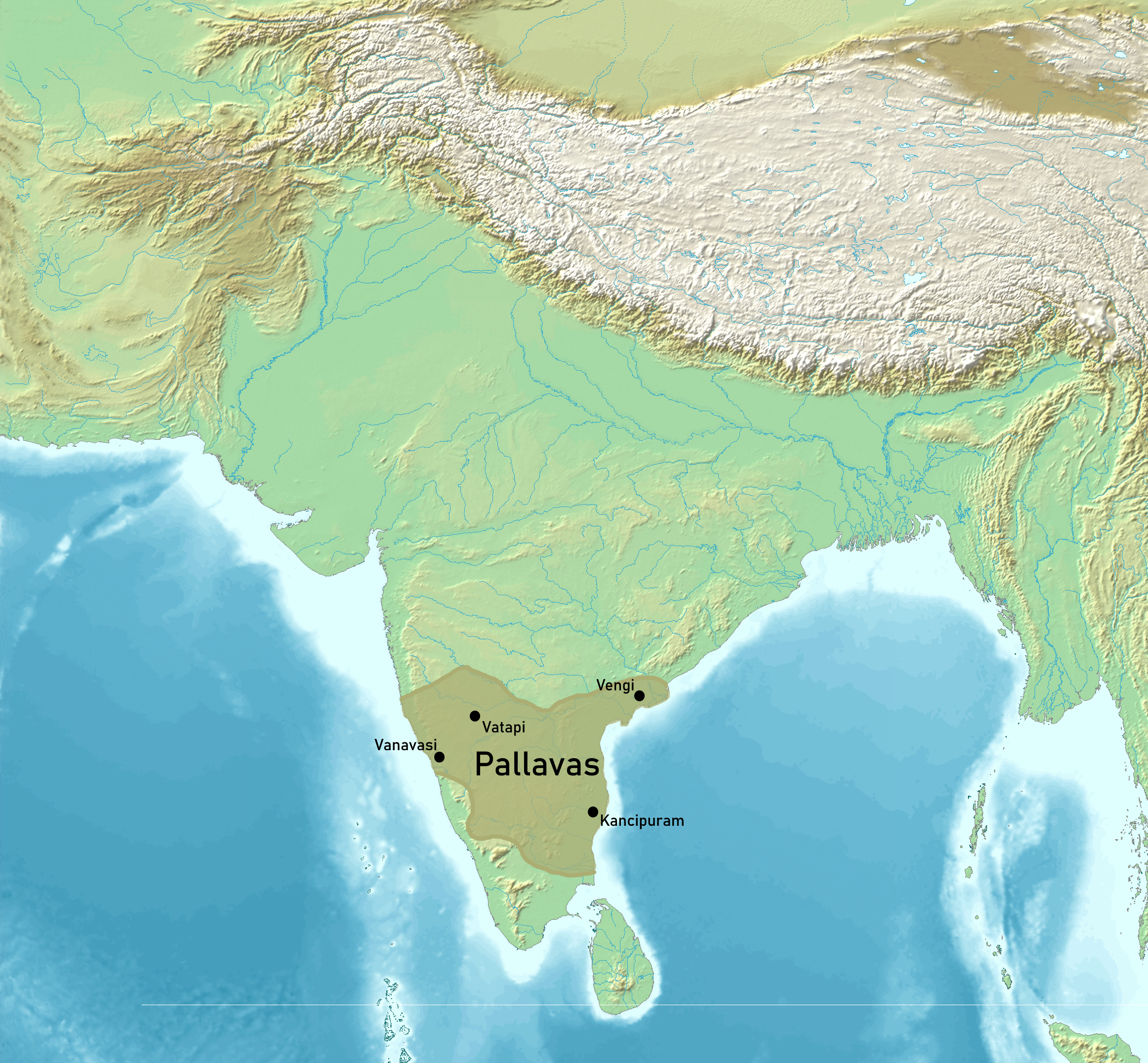
Map of the Early Pallavas

==== Later Pallavas ====
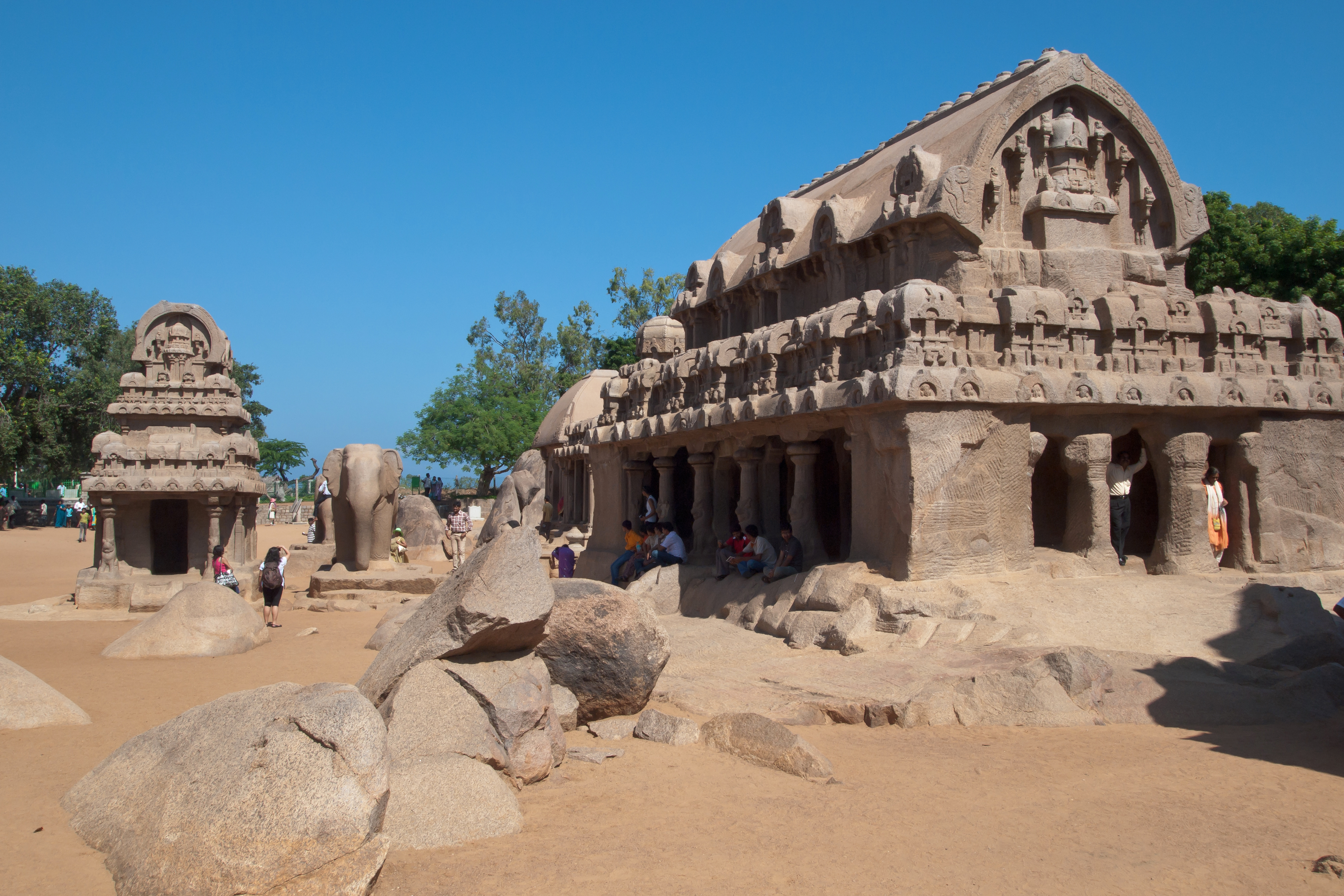
The rock-cut temples at Mamallapuram constructed during the reign of Narasimhavarman I

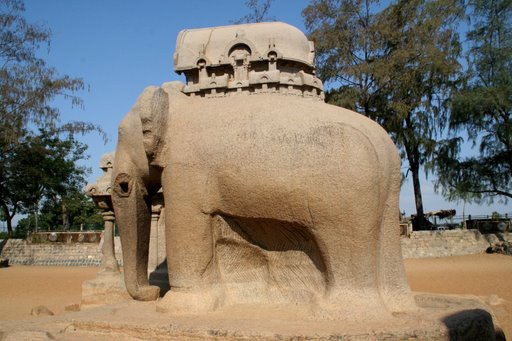
Elephant carved out of a single-stone

The incursion of the Kalabhras and the confusion in the Tamil country was broken by the Pandya Kadungon and the Pallava Simhavishnu. Mahendravarman I extended the Pallava Kingdom and was one of the greatest sovereigns. Some of the most ornate monuments and temples in southern India, carved out of solid rock, were introduced under his rule. He also wrote the play Mattavilasa Prahasana.

The Pallava kingdom began to gain both in territory and influence and were a regional power by the end of the 6th century, defeating kings of Ceylon and mainland Tamilakkam. Narasimhavarman I and Paramesvaravarman I stand out for their achievements in both military and architectural spheres. Narasimhavarman II built the Shore Temple.

- Simhavishnu (575–600)
- Mahendravarman I (600–630)
- Narasimhavarman I (Mamalla) (630–668)
- Mahendravarman II (668–672)
- Paramesvaravarman I (670–695)
- Narasimhavarman II (Raja Simha) (695–722)
- Paramesvaravarman II (705–710)

===== Later Pallavas of the Kadava Line =====
The kings that came after Paramesvaravarman II belonged to the collateral line of Pallavas and were descendants of Bhimavarman, the brother of Simhavishnu. They called themselves as Kadavas, Kadavesa and Kaduvetti. Hiranyavarman, the father of Nandivarman Pallavamalla is said to have belonged to the Kadavakula in epigraphs. Nandivarman II himself is described as "one who was born to raise the prestige of the Kadava family".

- Nandivarman II (Pallavamalla) (732–796) son of Hiranyavarman of Kadavakula
- Dantivarman (795–846)
- Nandivarman III (846–869)
- Aparajitavarman (879–897)

=== Aiyangar chronology ===
According to the available inscriptions of the Pallavas, historian S. Krishnaswami Aiyangar proposes the Pallavas could be divided into four separate families or dynasties; some of whose connections are known and some unknown. Aiyangar states

We have a certain number of charters in Prakrit of which three are important ones. Then follows a dynasty which issued their charters in Sanskrit; following this came the family of the great Pallavas beginning with Simha Vishnu; this was followed by a dynasty of the usurper Nandi Varman, another great Pallava. We are overlooking for the present the dynasty of the Ganga-Pallavas postulated by the Epigraphists. The earliest of these Pallava charters is the one known as the Mayidavolu 1 (Guntur district) copper-plates.

Based on a combination of dynastic plates and grants from the period, Aiyangar proposed their rule thus:

==== Early Pallavas ====
- Bappadevan, chola prince (250–275) – married a Naga of Mavilanga (Kanchi) – The Great Founder of a Pallava lineage
- Shivaskandavarman I (275–300)
- Simhavarman (300–320)
- Bhuddavarman (320–335)
- Bhuddyankuran (335–340)

==== Middle Pallavas ====
- Visnugopa (340–355) (Yuvamaharaja Vishnugopa)
- Kumaravisnu I (355–370)
- Skanda Varman II (370–385)
- Vira Varman (385–400)
- Skanda Varman III (400–435)
- Simha Varman II (435–460)
- Skanda Varman IV (460–480)
- Nandi Varman I (480–500)
- Kumaravisnu II (c. 500–510)
- Buddha Varman (c. 510–520)
- Kumaravisnu III (c. 520–530)
- Simha Varman III (c. 530–537)

==== Later Pallavas ====
- Simhavishnu (537–570)
- Mahendravarman I (571–630)
- Narasimhavarman I (Mamalla) (630–668)
- Mahendravarman II (668–672)
- Paramesvaravarman I (672–700)
- Narasimhavarman II (Raja Simha) (700–727)
- Paramesvaravarman II (705–710)

===== Later Pallavas of the Kadava Line =====
- Nandivarman II (Pallavamalla) (732–796) son of Hiranyavarman of Kadavakula
- Dantivarman (775–825)
- Nandivarman III (825–869)
- Nirupathungan (869–882)
- Aparajitavarman (882–896)

=== Genealogy of Māmallapuram Praśasti ===
The genealogy of Pallavas mentioned in the Māmallapuram Praśasti is as follows:

- Vishnu
- Brahma
- Unknown / undecipherable
- Unknown / undecipherable
- Bharadvaja
- Drona
- Ashvatthaman
- Pallava
- Unknown / undecipherable
- Unknown / undecipherable
- Simhavarman I (c. 275)
- Unknown / undecipherable
- Unknown / undecipherable
- Simhavarman IV (436–c. 460)
- Unknown / undecipherable
- Unknown / undecipherable
- Skandashishya
- Unknown / undecipherable
- Unknown / undecipherable
- Simhavisnu (c. 550–585)
- Mahendravarman I (c. 571–630)
- Maha-malla Narasimhavarman I (630–668)
- Unknown / undecipherable
- Paramesvaravarman I (669–690)
- Rajasimha Narasimhavaram II (690–728)
- Unknown / undecipherable
- Pallavamalla Nandivarman II (731–796)
- Unknown / undecipherable
- Nandivarman III (846–869)

=== Relation with the Cholas ===
According to historian S. Krishnaswami Aiyengar, the Pallavas were natives of Tondaimandalam and the name Pallava is identical with the word Tondaiyar. Chola Prince Ilandiraiyan is traditionally regarded as the founder of the Pallava dynasty. Ilandiraiyan is referred to in the literature of the Sangam period such as the Pathupattu. In the Sangam epic Manimekalai, he is depicted as the son of Chola king Killi and the Naga princess Pilivalai, the daughter of king Valaivanan of Manipallavam. When the boy grew up the princess wanted to send her son to the Chola kingdom. So she entrusted the prince to a merchant who dealt in woolen blankets called Kambala Chetty when his ship stopped in the island of Manipallavam. During the voyage to the Chola kingdom, the ship was wrecked due to rough weather and the boy was lost. He was later found washed ashore with a Tondai twig (creeper) around his leg. So he came to be called Tondaiman Ilam Tiraiyan meaning the young one of the seas or waves. When he grew up the northern part of the Chola kingdom was entrusted to him and the area he governed came to be called Tondaimandalam after him.He was a poet himself and four of his songs are extant even today. He ruled from Tondaimandalam and was known as "Tondaman."

== Other relationships ==
Pallava royal lineages were influential in the old kingdom of Kedah of the Malay Peninsula under Rudravarman I, Champa under Bhadravarman I and the Kingdom of the Funan in Cambodia. Some historians have claimed the present Palli Vanniyar caste are descendants of the Pallavas who ruled the Andhra and Tamil countries between the 6th and 9th centuries. Tamil scholar M. Srinivasa Iyengar claimed the Pallis were one of the communities who served often in Pallava armies.

The similarity of the name ending "-varman" of Pallava rulers with that of Hindu kings during the Hindu/Buddhist era of Indonesia such as king Mulavarman of the Kutai Martadipura Kingdom, king Purnawarman of the Tarumanagara kingdom, king Adityawarman of the Malayapura kingdom, etc. has been commented upon by historians since discovery. There have been possible high relations and connections of the Hindu kingdoms of Indonesia with the Pallava dynasty and other Hindu and Buddhist kingdoms of India back then.

== List of feudatories ==
- Salankayana dynasty

== See also ==
- List of Tamil monarchs
- Kadava dynasty
- Pallar
- Nolamba dynasty

== Sources ==
- Aiyangar, S. K.; Nilakanta Sastri, K. A. (1960), "The Pallavas", in R. C. Majumdar; K. K. Dasgupta (eds.), A Comprehensive History of India, Volume III, Part 1: A.D. 300–985, New Delhi: Indian History Congress/People's Publishing House
- Avari, Burjor (2007), India: The Ancient Past, New York: Routledge
- Hermann, Kulke; Rothermund D (2001) [2000], A History of India, Routledge, ISBN 0-415-32920-5
- Kulke, Hermann; Rothermund, Dietmar (2004), A History of India (Fourth ed.), Routledge, ISBN 9780415329194
- Minakshi, Cadambi (1938), Administration and Social Life Under the Pallavas, Madras: University of Madras
- Prasad, Durga (1988), History of the Andhras up to 1565 A.D., Guntur, India: P.G. Publishers
- Raghava Iyengar, R (1949), Perumbanarruppatai, a commentary, Chidambaram, India: Annamalai University Press
- Ramaswamy, Vijaya (2007), Historical dictionary of the Tamils, Lanham, Md.: Scarecrow Press, ISBN 9780810864450
- Sastri, Kallidaikurichi Aiyah Nilakanta (1961), A History of South India: From Prehistoric Times to the Fall of Vijayanagar (3rd ed.), Oxford University Press
- Sathianathaier, R. (1970) [first published 1954], "Dynasties of South India", in Majumdar, R. C.; Pusalkar, A. D. (eds.), The Classical Age, History and Culture of Indian People (Third ed.), Bharatiya Vidya Bhavan, pp. 255–275
- Shrimali, K M (1992), Proceedings Of The Indian History Congress 52nd Session, New Delhi: Amrit Printing Works
- Sircar, D. C. (1970) [first published 1954], "Genealogy and Chronology of the Pallavas", in Majumdar, R. C.; Pusalkar, A. D. (eds.), The Classical Age, History and Culture of Indian People (Third ed.), Bharatiya Vidya Bhavan, pp. 275–290
- C. R. Srinivasan (1979). Kanchipuram Through the Ages. Agam Kala Prakashan.
- Venkatasubramanian, T. K. (1986). Political change and agrarian tradition in South India (c. 1600-1801): a case study. Delhi, India: Mittal Publications.

Timeline and cultural period	Indus plain (Punjab-Sapta Sindhu-Gujarat)	Gangetic Plain			Central India	Southern India
Timeline and cultural period	Indus plain (Punjab-Sapta Sindhu-Gujarat)	Upper Gangetic Plain (Ganga-Yamuna doab)	Middle Gangetic Plain	Lower Gangetic Plain	Central India	Southern India
IRON AGE
Culture	Late Vedic Period	Late Vedic Period; Painted Grey Ware culture	Late Vedic Period; Northern Black Polished Ware		Pre-history	
6th century BCE	Gandhara	Kuru-Panchala	Magadha		Adivasi (tribes)	Assaka
Culture	Persian-Greek influences	"Second Urbanisation"; Rise of Shramana movements Jainism - Buddhism - Ājīvika - Yoga			Pre-history	
5th century BCE	(Persian conquests)		Shaishunaga dynasty		Adivasi (tribes)	Assaka
4th century BCE	(Greek conquests)	Nanda empire				
HISTORICAL AGE
Culture	Spread of Buddhism				Pre-history	
3rd century BCE	Maurya Empire					Satavahana dynasty Sangam period (300 BCE – 200 CE); Early Cholas; Early Pandyan kingdom Cheras
Culture	Preclassical Hinduism (Note: Michaels (2004) p.39) - "Hindu Synthesis" (Note: Hiltebeitel (2002)) (ca. 200 BCE - 300 CE) (Note: Michaels (2004) p.39) (Note: Hiltebeitel (2002)); Epics - Puranas - Ramayana - Mahabharata - Bhagavad Gita - Brahma Sutras - Smarta Tradition; Mahayana Buddhism					
2nd century BCE	Indo-Greek Kingdom		Shunga Empire; Maha-Meghavahana Dynasty			Satavahana dynasty Sangam period (300 BCE – 200 CE); Early Cholas; Early Pandyan kingdom Cheras
1st century BCE	Indo-Greek Kingdom		Shunga Empire; Maha-Meghavahana Dynasty			Satavahana dynasty Sangam period (300 BCE – 200 CE); Early Cholas; Early Pandyan kingdom Cheras
1st century CE	Indo-Scythians; Indo-Parthians		Kuninda Kingdom			Satavahana dynasty Sangam period (300 BCE – 200 CE); Early Cholas; Early Pandyan kingdom Cheras
2nd century	Kushan Empire					Satavahana dynasty Sangam period (300 BCE – 200 CE); Early Cholas; Early Pandyan kingdom Cheras
3rd century	Kushano-Sasanian Kingdom; Western Satraps	Kushan Empire		Kamarupa kingdom	Adivasi (tribes)	Satavahana dynasty Sangam period (300 BCE – 200 CE); Early Cholas; Early Pandyan kingdom Cheras
Culture	"Golden Age of Hinduism"(ca. CE 320-650) (Note: Michaels (2004) p.40); Puranas - Kural; Co-existence of Hinduism and Buddhism					
4th century	Kidarites	Gupta Empire; Varman dynasty				Andhra Ikshvakus; Kalabhra dynasty Kadamba Dynasty; Western Ganga Dynasty
5th century	Hephthalite Empire	Alchon Huns				Vishnukundina; Kalabhra dynasty
6th century	Nezak Huns; Kabul Shahi; Maitraka				Adivasi (tribes)	Vishnukundina; Badami Chalukyas; Kalabhra dynasty
Culture	Late-Classical Hinduism (ca. CE 650-1100) (Note: Michaels (2004) p.41); Advaita Vedanta - Tantra; Decline of Buddhism in India					
7th century	Indo-Sassanids		Vakataka dynasty Empire of Harsha	Mlechchha dynasty	Adivasi (tribes)	Badami Chalukyas; Eastern Chalukyas; Pandyan kingdom (revival); Pallava
7th century	Karkota dynasty				Adivasi (tribes)	
8th century	Kabul Shahi	Pala Empire			Adivasi (tribes)	Eastern Chalukyas; Pandyan kingdom Kalachuri
9th century	Gurjara-Pratihara				Adivasi (tribes)	Rashtrakuta Empire; Eastern Chalukyas; Pandyan kingdom Medieval Cholas; Chera Perumals of Makkotai
10th century	Ghaznavids			Pala dynasty Kamboja-Pala dynasty	Adivasi (tribes)	Kalyani Chalukyas; Eastern Chalukyas; Medieval Cholas; Chera Perumals of Makkotai; Rashtrakuta
References and sources for table References Sources: Flood, Gavin D. (1996), An Introduction to Hinduism, Cambridge University Press; Hiltebeitel, Alf (2002), Hinduism. In: Joseph Kitagawa, "The Religious Traditions of Asia: Religion, History, and Culture", Routledge; Michaels, Axel (2004), Hinduism. Past and present, Princeton, New Jersey: Princeton University Press
