= Nriputungavarman =

Pallava King

Pallava King
- Reign: c. 869 – c. 880 CE
- Predecessor: Nandivarman III
- Successor: Aparajitavarman
- Spouse: Viramahadevi; Kadavanmadevi
- Dynasty: Pallava
- Father: Nandivarman III
- Mother: Shankha

Pallava Monarchs (3rd–9th Century CE)
- Virakurcha: (Unknown)
- Vishnugopa I: (Unknown)
- Vishnugopa II: (Unknown)
- Simhavarman III: (Unknown)
- Simhavishnu: 575–600
- Mahendravarman I: 600–630
- Narasimhavarman I: 630–668
- Mahendravarman II: 668–670
- Parameswaravarman I: 670–695
- Narasimhavarman II: 695–728
- Paramesvaravarman II: 728–731
- Nandivarman II: 731–795
- Dantivarman: 795–846
- Nandivarman III: 846–869
- Nriputungavarman: 869–880
- Aparajita Varman: 880–897

Nriputungavarman (fl. c. 869–880 CE) was a king of the Pallava dynasty. Nriputungavarman was the younger son of Nandivarman III and his wife, the Rashtrakuta princess Shankha. Nrpatungavarman had at least two queens, Viramahadevi and Kadavanmadevi, as both appear in his inscriptions as donors. Under his reign, a Vishnu temple in Ukkal was commissioned for his queen.

A copper plate inscription dating to the eighth year of the reign of Nriputunga Varman was unearthed in Bahour in 1879. The inscription in both Sanskrit and Tamil describes a grant of income from three villages to a seat of learning at Bahour.

Other than his inscriptions, Nriputungavarman is also known for his military successes against the Pandyas. Notably, he defeated Pandya king Srimara Srivallabha at the Battle of Arichil, completing his father, Nandivarman III's goal of recapturing southern Pallava territories that had been lost during the reign of Dantivarman.

Nriputungavarman Pallava dynasty
Preceded by Nandivarman III	Pallava dynasty 846–869	Succeeded by Aparajitavarman
