= Dantivarman =

Pallava Monarch from 795 to 846

Pallava Monarch
- Reign: c. 795 – c. 846 CE
- Predecessor: Nandivarman II
- Successor: Nandivarman III
- Born: Kanchipuram, Pallava Kingdom (present-day Tamil Nadu, India)
- Died: 846 CE; Kanchipuram, Pallava Kingdom
- Spouse: Aggalanimmadi
- Issue: Nandivarman III
- Dynasty: Pallava
- Father: Nandivarman II
- Mother: Reva

Pallava Monarchs (3rd–9th Century CE)
- Virakurcha: (Unknown)
- Vishnugopa I: (Unknown)
- Vishnugopa II: (Unknown)
- Simhavarman III: (Unknown)
- Simhavishnu: 575–600
- Mahendravarman I: 600–630
- Narasimhavarman I: 630–668
- Mahendravarman II: 668–670
- Parameswaravarman I: 670–695
- Narasimhavarman II: 695–728
- Paramesvaravarman II: 728–731
- Nandivarman II: 731–795
- Dantivarman: 795–846
- Nandivarman III: 846–869
- Nriputungavarman: 869–880
- Aparajita Varman: 880–897

Dantivarman ruled the Pallava kingdom from 795 to 846 CE. He was the son of Nandivarman II and his queen, the Rashtrakuta princess Reva.

== Reign ==
Dantivarman ruled the Pallava kingdom for 51 years. During his reign, the decline of the Pallavas had set in. Pandyan intrusions in the south reduced the Pallava territory to areas in and around Kanchipuram. In 803 CE, the Rashtrakuta emperor Govinda III defeated him and entered Kanchi.

The Telugu Chola monarch Srikantha conquered and occupied Tondaimandalam and appointed as its ruler a member of a junior branch of the Pallavas named Abhimanasiddhi, who appears to have some relation to the Cholas as well. Dantivarman fled and took shelter in the Kadamba kingdom, with whom he was related matrimonially. No inscription of Dantivarman was found between his 21st and 49th regnal years (i.e. from circa 818 CE – 845 CE).

This interregnum caused by the Telugu Chodas was put to an end in the 49th regnal year of Dantivarman, who was assisted by his crown prince Nandivarman III (born through the Kadamba princess Aggalanimmadi), and regained his lost territory. However, the southern regions of the Pallava kingdom continued to be under Pandyan control.

== Notes ==
Dantivarman Pallava dynasty
Preceded by Nandivarman II	Pallava dynasty 796–846	Succeeded by Nandivarman III
