= Nandivarman III =

Pallava emperor from 846 to 869

- Tellaru erinda

Pallava Monarch
- Reign: c. 846 – c. 869
- Predecessor: Dantivarman
- Successor: Nriputungavarman (south); Kampavarman (north)
- Spouse: Shankha; Kandan Marampavaiyar
- Issue: Nriputungavarman, Kampavarman
- Dynasty: Pallava
- Father: Dantivarman
- Mother: Aggalanimati
- Religion: Jainism (Digambara)

Pallava Monarchs (3rd–9th Century CE)
- Virakurcha: (Unknown)
- Vishnugopa I: (Unknown)
- Vishnugopa II: (Unknown)
- Simhavarman III: (Unknown)
- Simhavishnu: 575–600
- Mahendravarman I: 600–630
- Narasimhavarman I: 630–668
- Mahendravarman II: 668–670
- Parameswaravarman I: 670–695
- Narasimhavarman II: 695–728
- Paramesvaravarman II: 728–731
- Nandivarman II: 731–795
- Dantivarman: 795–846
- Nandivarman III: 846–869
- Nriputungavarman: 869–880
- Aparajita Varman: 880–897

Nandivarman III (r. 846–869) was a monarch of the Nandivarman II line, who ruled the Pallava kingdom from 846 to 869. He was the son of Dantivarman and the grandson of Nandivarman II.

== Reign ==
Nandivarman III was born to the Pallava king Dantivarman and a Kadamba princess named Aggalanimati. His guru (teacher) was the well-known Digambara Jain monk Jinasena. He tried to reverse the decline that began in the reign of his father Dantivarman. Nandivarman III made an alliance with the Rashtrakutas and the Gangas to form a confederacy against the Pandyas. He defeated the Pandyas at the Battle of Tellaru in 830. He then pursued the retreating Pandyan army as far as the Vaigai river. The Pandyan king Srimara Srivallabha, however, recovered most of his territories and even defeated the Pallavas at Kumbakonam.

Nandivarman had a powerful navy and maintained trade contacts with Siam and Malaya. He possibly conquered territory in Southeast Asia as he constructed a Vishnu temple at Siam which was placed under the protection of the Manigramam merchant guild. He was a great patron of arts and literature. The Bharatam was translated into Tamil by Perundevanar under his patronage. The Nandikkalambakam was composed by a poet in praise of Nandivarman III. His reign saw the construction of the Vishnu temple at Kiliyanur and the Shiva temple at Thirukattupalli.

Nandivarman III married a Rashtrakuta princess named Shankha, who was likely the daughter of Amoghavarsha I, the Rashtrakuta emperor. He had a son named Nripatunga from Shankha, who succeeded him as king. His second wife was a Paluvettaraiyar princess named Kandan Marampavaiyar, through which he had his second son named Kampavarman. Before his death, Nandivarman III divided his kingdom between his two sons- Nriputungavarman ruling in the south and Kampavarman ruling in the north.

Nandivarman III Pallava dynasty
Preceded by Dantivarman	Pallava dynasty 846–869	Succeeded by Aparajitavarman
