= Parameswaravarman I =

Pallava monarch from 670 to 695

Pallava emperor
- Reign: c. 670–695
- Predecessor: Mahendravarman II
- Successor: Narasimhavarman II
- Issue: Narasimhavarman II
- Dynasty: Pallava
- Father: Mahendravarman II
- Religion: Hinduism

Pallava Monarchs (3rd–9th Century CE)
- Virakurcha: (Unknown)
- Vishnugopa I: (Unknown)
- Vishnugopa II: (Unknown)
- Simhavarman III: (Unknown)
- Simhavishnu: 575–600
- Mahendravarman I: 600–630
- Narasimhavarman I: 630–668
- Mahendravarman II: 668–670
- Parameswaravarman I: 670–695
- Narasimhavarman II: 695–728
- Paramesvaravarman II: 728–731
- Nandivarman II: 731–795
- Dantivarman: 795–846
- Nandivarman III: 846–869
- Nriputungavarman: 869–880
- Aparajita Varman: 880–897

Parameswaravarman I was a Pallava emperor who reigned in southern India in the latter half of the 7th century, from 670 to 695 CE. He ascended to the throne after the death of his father Mahendravarman II in 670 CE. His grandfather Narasimhavarman I had already made the Pallava Empire the most powerful force in the subcontinent and destroyed the Chalukya capital at Vatapi. Parameswaravarman was an efficient and capable ruler, known for his military exploits, his love for poetry, and his devotion to the God Siva, to whom he erected many temples.

== Reign ==
Parameswaravarman's reign was marked by revived conflicts with the Chalukyas, led by Vikramaditya I who had fought against his grandfather and was now allied with many rulers . In 674 CE, the two armies met at Peruvalanallur near Tiruchirappalli and Parameswaravarman was victorious stupendously despite facing a huge coalition.

== Military career ==
According to the Honnur plates of Chalukya Vikramaditya I, dated in his 16th regnal year (circa 670 A.D. -671 A.D.), he camped in Malliyur on his way to Kanchipuram and with the help of the Gangas of Talakkad defeated the Pallavas.

=== Battle of Vilande ===
To avenge the defeat, the Pallava king first waged a war against the Ganga ruler Bhuvikrama, the supporter of the Chalukyas. From the Bedirur grant of Bhuvikrama and Hallegere plates of his brother and successor Sivamara, it is known that in this battle, which occurred at a place called Vilande, Paramesvaravarman I not only faced defeat in the hands of Bhuvikrama, but he was also deprived of his royal necklace.

=== Battle of Peruvallanallur ===
As a result of this aggressive policy of Paramesvaravarman I, he was again attacked by the Chalukyan king Vikramaditya I and seized Kanchipuram after defeating him. According to the Chalukyan records Vikramaditya seems to have pushed on to the south, and he was encamped at Uragapura (Uraiyur) on the south bank of the Kaveri river on April 25 A.D. 674. Where he was opposed by Paramesvaravarman I and the Pandyan king Kochchadaiyan Ranadhira, near Trichinopoly a battle was fought at Peruvalanallur. And the Kendur plates say that Vikramaditya I, fought with the Pandyas.We have also Supposed that Pandya king was one of the three confederates who gained the victory at Peruvallanallur. Pallava and Pandya records equally claim that, in this battle the Chalukyas was defeated.The Velvikudi copper plates mention Ranadhira victory over the Karnatas(i.e.,Chalukyas). And bore the title of (Madurakarunatakan). Based on these evidences, scholars such as D. C. Sircar theorize that Vikramaditya fought against the Pallavas as a subordinate of his brothers, and ascended the throne only after their deaths. The term "three kings" apparently refers to the Chola, Chera, and Pandya rulers who had allied with the Pallavas.Vikramaditya evidently had now against him a combination of Pallavas, Pandyas and Cholas.

=== Aftermath ===
Paramesvaravarman then sent an expedition into the Chalukya country. In the ensuing Battle of Puruvalanallur in 674 with Vikramaditya's forces, the Pallavas defeated the Chalukyas. The defeated Chalukyan army was led by Vikramaditya's son and grandson Vinayaditya and Vijayaditya.Pallava king Paramesvaravarman must have mustered his forces and sought the assistance of the Chola, Pandya and Chera of South India in order to give a crushing blow to their common enemy Vikramaditya.The Kanchipuram Inscriptions state that Rajasimha was son of Ugradanda the destroyer of Ranarasika's city and that epithet Ranarasika reffer to chalukya king Vikramaditya. The combined forces of these four powers entered the Chalukyan territory and probably sacked and captured Vatapi ' the city of Ranarasika ’ on this occasion. Pallavas went on to occupy many of the Chalukya territories but later left after the chalukyas agreed to pay yearly tributes . After They were routed by Vinayaditya probably in A. D. 678–79, when he was nominated lo the throne as indicated by his Jejuri plates and the Togarchedu grant.

He was succeeded by his son Narasimhavarman II also called Rajasimha in 695 CE.

Parameswaravarman I Pallava dynasty
| Preceded by Mahendravarman II | Pallava dynasty 670–695 | Succeeded by Narasimhavarman II |
