= Narasimhavarman I =

Pallava emperor from 630 to 668

- Vatapikondan; Mahamallan
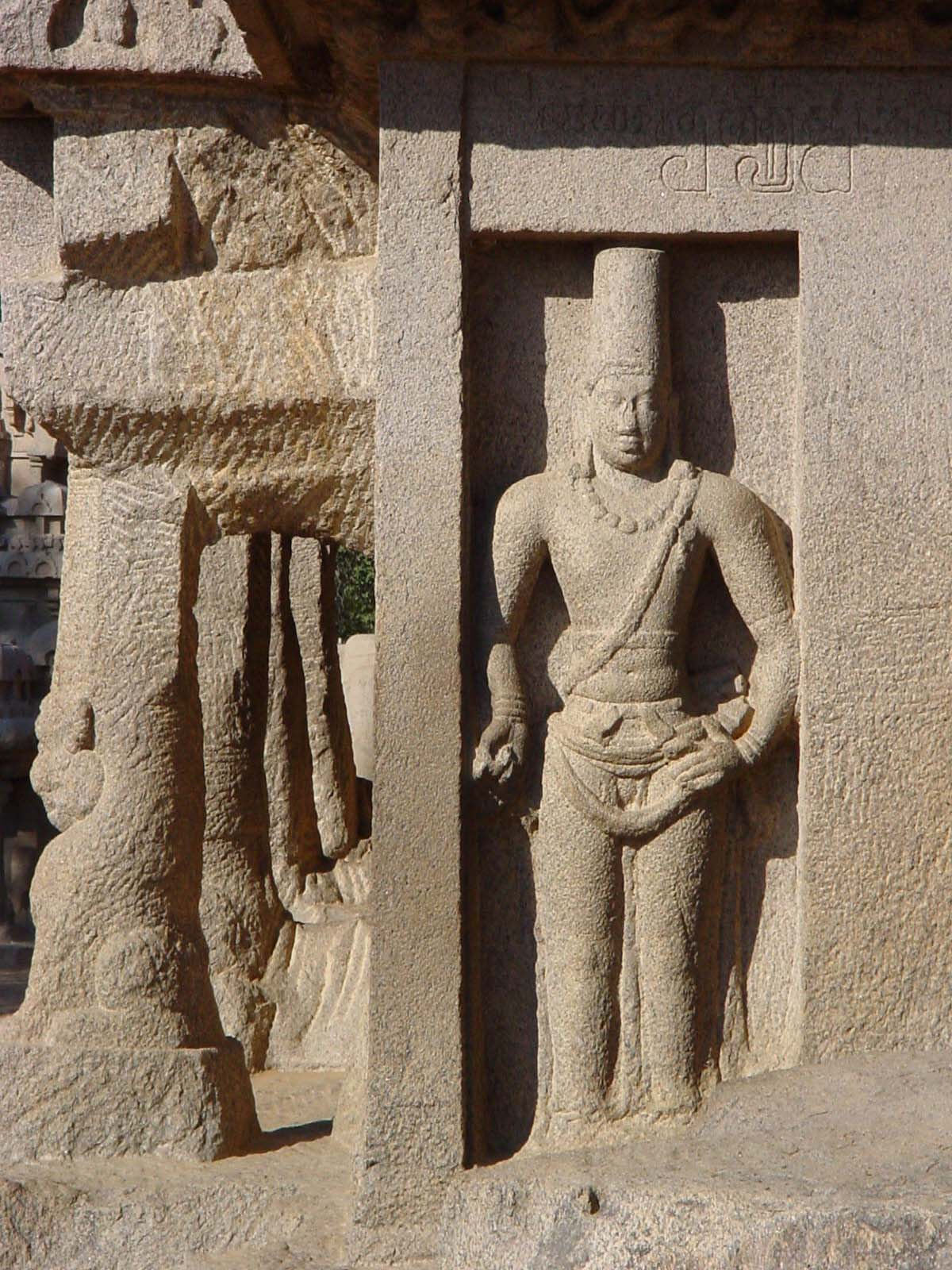
- Sculpture of Narasimhavarman I at Mamallapuram.

Pallava emperor
- Reign: c. 630 – c. 668
- Predecessor: Mahendravarman I
- Successor: Mahendravarman II
- Born: Kanchipuram, Pallava Empire
- Died: 668; Kanchipuram, Pallava Empire
- Spouse: Unnamed Pandyan Princess
- Issue: Mahendravarman II
- Dynasty: Pallava
- Father: Mahendravarman I
- Mother: Unknown
- Religion: Jainism

Pallava Monarchs (3rd–9th Century CE)
- Virakurcha: (Unknown)
- Vishnugopa I: (Unknown)
- Vishnugopa II: (Unknown)
- Simhavarman III: (Unknown)
- Simhavishnu: 575–600
- Mahendravarman I: 600–630
- Narasimhavarman I: 630–668
- Mahendravarman II: 668–670
- Parameswaravarman I: 670–695
- Narasimhavarman II: 695–728
- Paramesvaravarman II: 728–731
- Nandivarman II: 731–795
- Dantivarman: 795–846
- Nandivarman III: 846–869
- Nriputungavarman: 869–880
- Aparajita Varman: 880–897

Narasimhavarman I was a Pallava emperor who reigned from 630 to 668. He shared his father Mahendravarman I's love of art and completed the works started by Mahendravarman in Mamallapuram. During his reign, the famous Pancha Rathas, a monolithic rock-cut temple complex and a UNESCO World Heritage Site, was constructed.

He avenged his father's defeat at the hands of the Chalukya monarch Pulakeshin II in the year 642. Narasimhavarman I was also known as Mamallan (great wrestler), and Mamallapuram (Mahabalipuram) was named in his honour.

The Culavamsa, the Sri Lankan chronicle, refers to the Pallava ruler Narasimhavarman I by the epithet “Kanduvethi” (or “Kaduvetti"). Historians interpret this title as linguistically related to the term “Kadavan,” a designation later associated with the Kadava chiefs, and consider it indicative of an connection between early Pallavas with the Kadava lineage.

It was during his reign, in 640 CE, that the Chinese traveller Hiuen Tsang visited Kanchipuram.

Nanimhavarman I (630-668 A.D.) was alo like his father Mahendravarman 1 (600-630 A.D.) a follower and patron of Jainism The Nayanar poet-saints Appar, Paranjoti, and Sambandar lived during his reign.

Narasimhavarman I was succeeded by his son Mahendravarman II in the year 668 CE.

== Military conquests ==
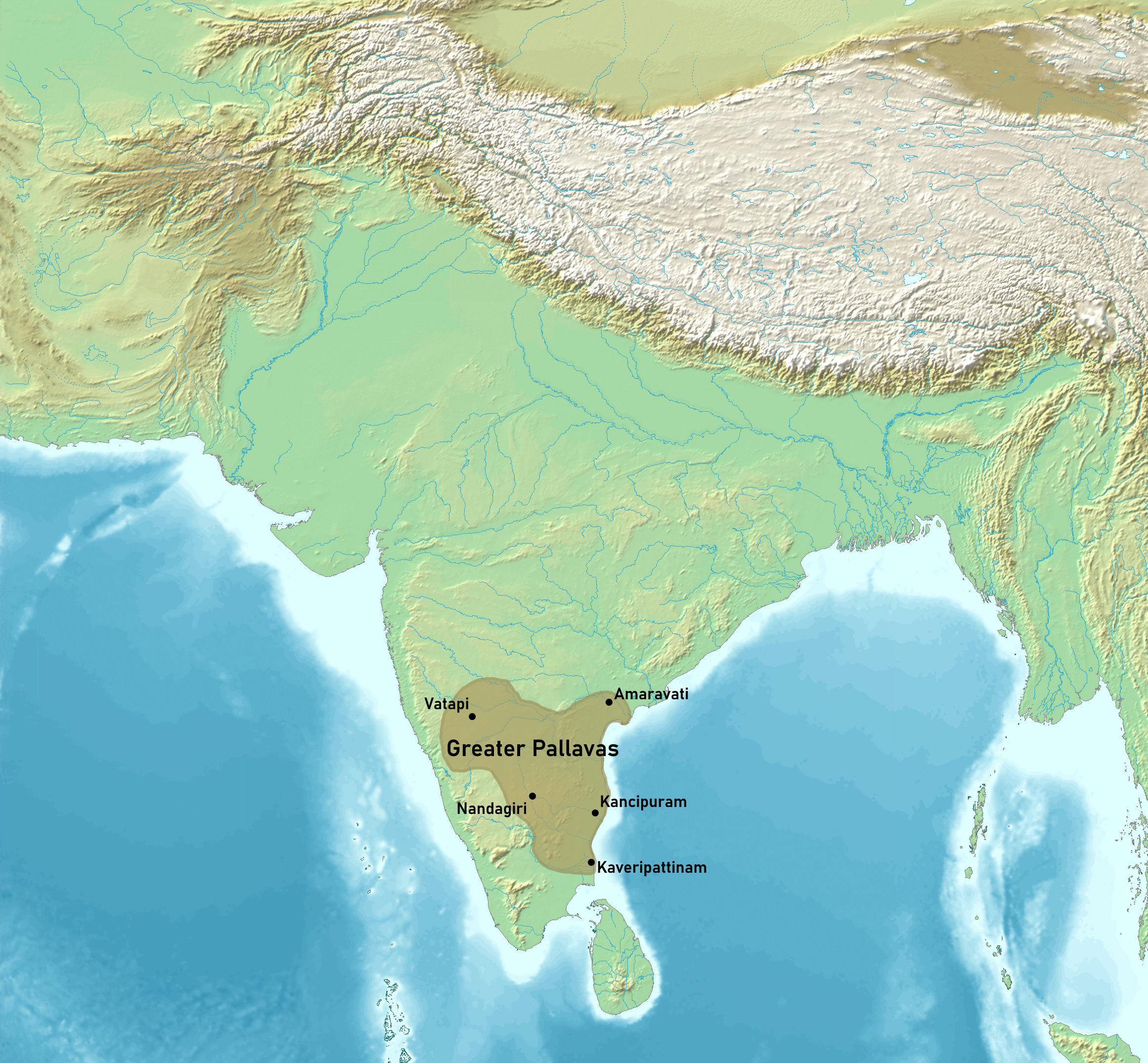
Greatest extent of Pallava Empire, during the reign of Narasimhavarman I (630–668 CE)

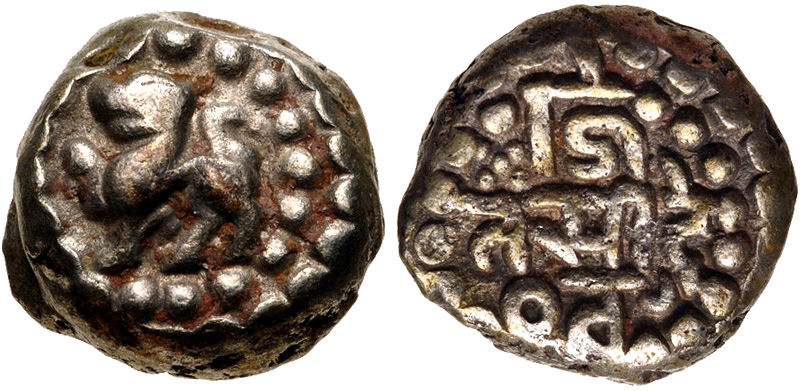
Coin of the Pallavas of Coromandel, king Narasimhavarman I. (630–668 CE).Obv Lion left Rev Name of Narasimhavarman with solar and lunar symbols around

Chalukyan Emperor Pulakeshin II had previously raided various northern Pallava provinces and forts. However, he was unable to capture the Pallava capital of Kanchipuram. This led to a long conflict between the Chalukyas and the Pallavas.

Pulakeshin II again attempts to seize the Pallava capital and undertook another expedition several years later. However, the Pallava reign had moved on to Narasimhavarman I by then. Narasimhavarman defeated the Chalukyas in several battles, including one at Manimangalam 20 miles to the east of Kanchipuram. The Pallava monarch states that he could see the back of his dreaded enemy as he tore apart his army. Encouraged by this victory, Narasimhavarman led his army along with his general Paranjothi and attacked Vatapi, successfully defeating and killing the Chalukyan Emperor Pulakeshin II in 642 CE. The city was never a capital again. He returned victorious to Kanchipuram, and was conferred the Tamil title Vatapikondan (lit. One who conquered Vatapi).

His general Paranjothi (a Vikrama Kesari, also known as Paradurgamarddana) was known very well for his devotion to the God Shiva and as one of the 63 Nayanar saints, is said to have personally destroyed the city of Vatapi under the command of Narasimhavarman I. Sekkizhaar's work 12th tirumurai credits this siruttondar of having destroyed the evil kali as manifested by the deccan enemy of the Pallavas. He is also known as 'Siruthondar', a dutiful warrior and a practicing medic who had "mastered several treatises in medicine". This vikramakesari had at the insistence of the God Shiva sacrificed his child without any qualms. There was a confusion as to whether the Ganesha at a temple in Chengattankudy could have been a result of this invasion. Many grants refer to this event as "Kilisayoneriva Vimattita Vathapi" or the one who destroyed Vatapi, the same way the Sage Agastya had killed a demon by that name long ago.(**)

=== Influence on Sri Lankan politics ===
The Sinhalese prince Manavarman lived at the court of Narasimhavarman I and had helped him crush his enemy Pulakeshin II. In return, Narasimhavarman had helped Manavarman twice with an army to conquer Sri Lanka. The Chulavamsa documents a profound same-sex relationship between Manavarman and Narasimhavarman. The second expedition was successful. Manavarman conquered Sri Lanka, over which he is supposed to have ruled from 691 to 726 CE. The Kasakudi copper plates refer to Narasimhavarman's conquest of Sri Lanka. The Mahavamsa also confirms these facts.

== Cultural Impact ==
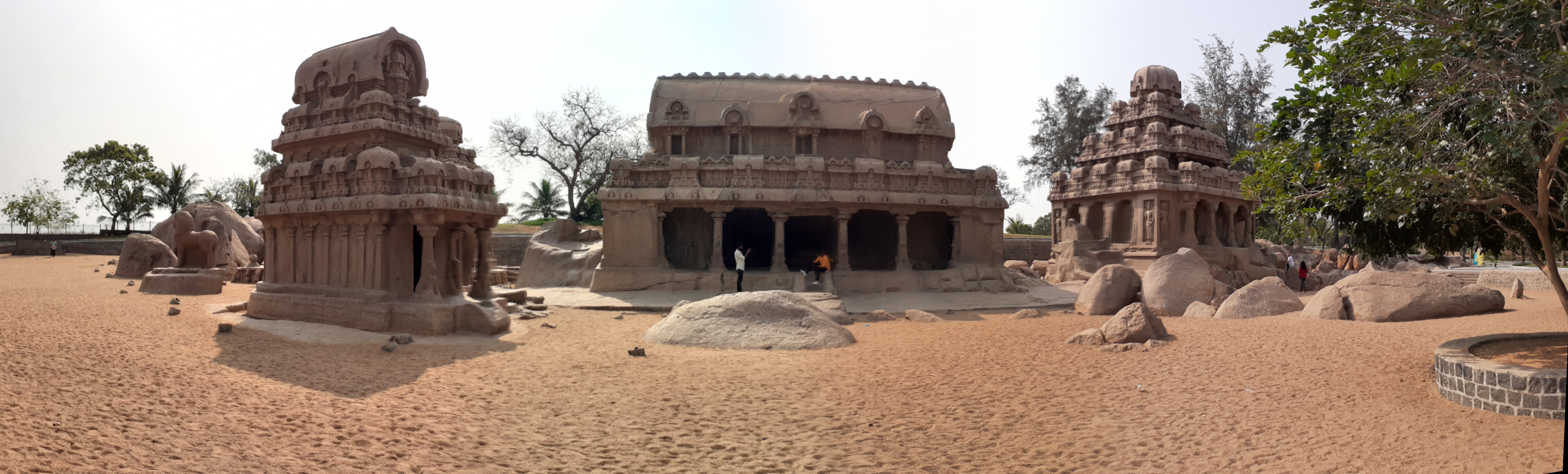
The famous Pancha Rathas were completed during his tenure

The Pancha Rathas, a monolithic rock-cut temple complex and a UNESCO World Heritage Site were constructed during his reign.

== Narasimhavarman in literature ==
Kalki Krishnamurthy's work, Sivagamiyin Sabadham, is based on Narasimhavarman's early years and his battles with the Chalukyas. Kalki Krishnamurthy's Parthiban kanavu is based on the later years of Narasimhavarman's rule. He completed most of the monuments in Mahabalipuram, which in modern times are grouped as Group of Monuments at Mahabalipuram and one of the UNESCO world heritage sites.

== Notes ==
Narasimhavarman I Pallava dynasty
Preceded by Mahendravarman I	Pallava dynasty 630–668	Succeeded by Mahendravarman II
