= Nandivarman II =

Pallava emperor from 731 to 796

- rajathirajaparameshvara , Perumanatikal

Pallava Monarch
- Reign: 731–796
- Predecessor: Paramesvaravarman II
- Successor: Dantivarman
- Born: 718: Simhapura, Champa (present-day Trà Kiệu, Vietnam); Bhimhapura, Kambujadeśa (present-day Phimai, Thailand)
- Died: 796 (aged 77–78); Kanchipuram, Pallava Kingdom (present-day Tamil Nadu, India)
- Spouse: Reva
- Issue: Dantivarman
- Dynasty: Pallava
- Father: Hiranyavarman

Pallava Monarchs (3rd–9th Century CE)
- Virakurcha: (Unknown)
- Vishnugopa I: (Unknown)
- Vishnugopa II: (Unknown)
- Simhavarman III: (Unknown)
- Simhavishnu: 575–600
- Mahendravarman I: 600–630
- Narasimhavarman I: 630–668
- Mahendravarman II: 668–670
- Parameswaravarman I: 670–695
- Narasimhavarman II: 695–728
- Paramesvaravarman II: 728–731
- Nandivarman II: 731–795
- Dantivarman: 795–846
- Nandivarman III: 846–869
- Nriputungavarman: 869–880
- Aparajita Varman: 880–897

Nandivarman II (718–796) was a Pallava monarch who reigned in southern India. Sen states Nandivarman reigned from 731 to 796 and built the Vaikuntha-Perumal Temple. From the Kasakkudi plates, it is learnt that Nandivarman II was a descendent of Bhimavarman, the younger brother of Pallava king Simhavishnu. Inscriptions beneath the panels at the Vaikuntha-Perumal Temple temple at Kanchipuram reveal that Nandivarman II hails from the country of Kambujadeśa (present-day Cambodia), where his father, Hiranyavarma Maharaja of the Katavesa-kula, belonging to a collateral branch of the Pallavas, was ruling with Bhimapura as the capital. Of the four sons of Hiranyavarman: Srimalla, Ranamalla, Samkramalla and Pallavamalla, the twelve year old Pallavamalla accepted the offer to ascend the throne at Kanchipuram, where he was crowned King of the Pallavas under the name Nandivarman. While some historians state that he was said to be a prince of the collateral branch of the family which had been ruling in Simhapura, Champa (in what is now Vietnam). Dantidurga helped Nandivarman recover Kanchi by warring against the Chalukyas.

== Biography ==
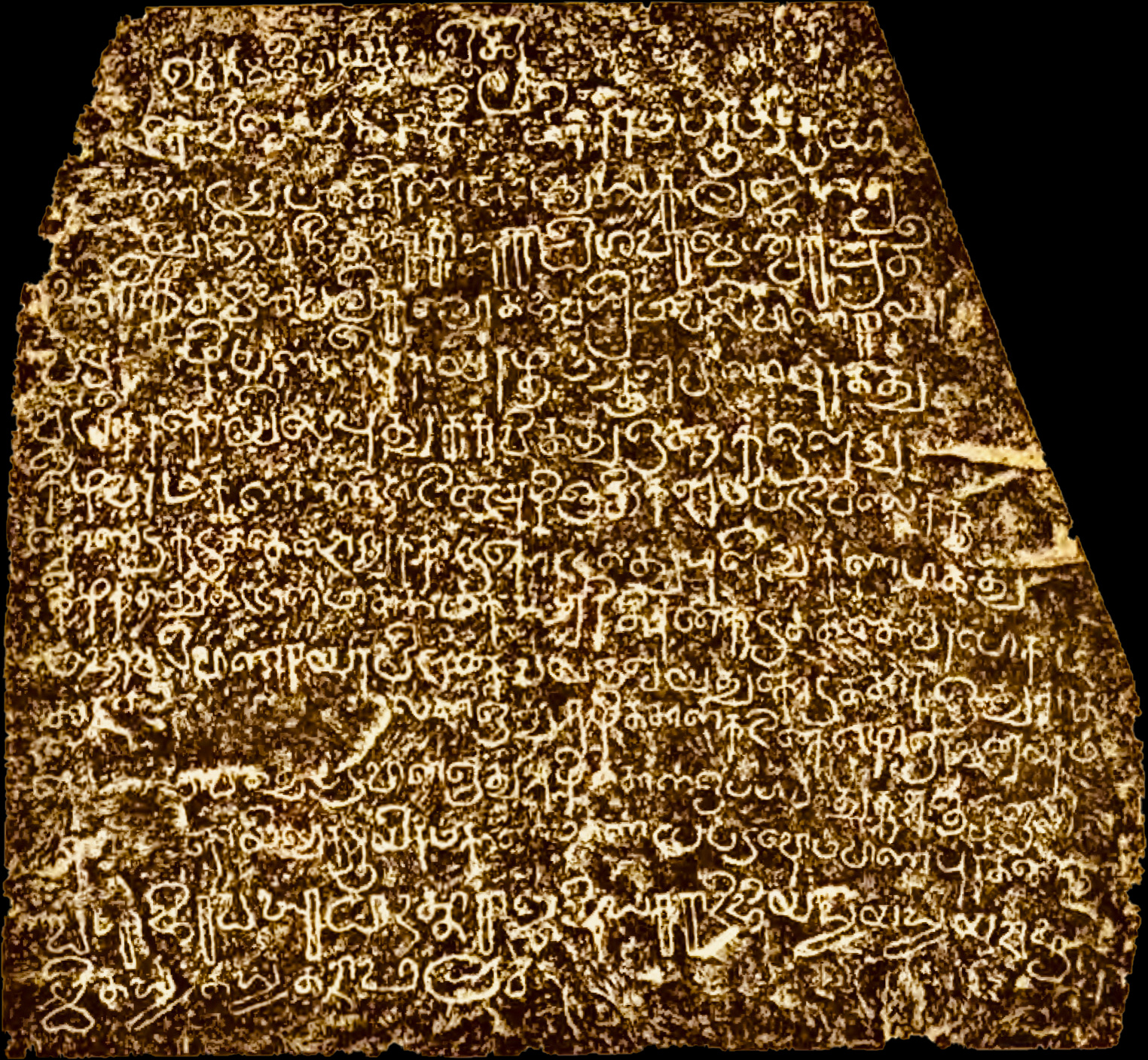
8th-century inscription of Nandivarman II from Vilwanatheswarar temple, Tiruvallam.

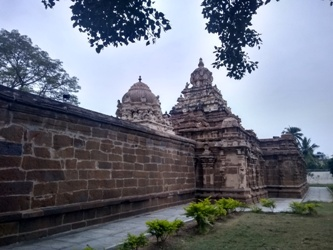
Tiru Parameswara Vinnagaram (Vaikunta Perumal Temple)

Paramesvaravarman II was succeeded by a 12-year-old Nandivarman II Pallavamalla who belonged to a collateral line of Pallavas called the Kadavas. The latter were the descendants of Bhimavarman, the brother of Simhavishnu. According to epigraphical findings, Hiranyavarman, the father of Nandivarman Pallavamalla belonged to the Kadavakula. Nandivarman II himself is described as "one who was born to raise the prestige of the Kadava family". He commissioned the Tiru Parameswara Vinnagaram.

The term Kaduvetti in Tamil means "destroyer or clearer of forests" as the Pallavas, like their ancestor Mukkanti Kaduvetti alias Trilochana Pallava, were known to often clear forests and introduce civilization by settling communities.

The previous monarch Paramesvaravarman II did not have an heir so the ministers, feudatories and advisors of the state took an expedition to neighboring states and distant lands to find a suitable prince of the original line. Upon reaching Kambujadesa (modern-day Cambodia and southern Vietnam), they finally identified Nandivarman II as belonging to the original line and willing to ascend the throne. Accordingly, he was brought and then installed on the throne of the Pallava kingdom.

He married Reva, the daughter of the Rashtrakuta emperor Dantidurga around 751 CE. Their son Dantivarman succeeded him after his death in 796. Dantidurga around 751 CE. Dantidurga helped Nandivarman recover Kanchi by warring against the Chalukyas.

Nandivarman II Pallava dynasty
Preceded by Paramesvaravarman II	Pallava dynasty 732–796	Succeeded by Dantivarman
