= Mahendravarman II =

Pallava emperor from 668 to 669

Pallava emperor
- Reign: 668–669
- Predecessor: Narasimhavarman I
- Successor: Paramesvaravarman I
- Issue: Paramesvaravarman I
- Dynasty: Pallava
- Father: Narasimhavarman I

Pallava Monarchs (3rd–9th Century CE)
- Virakurcha: (Unknown)
- Vishnugopa I: (Unknown)
- Vishnugopa II: (Unknown)
- Simhavarman III: (Unknown)
- Simhavishnu: 575–600
- Mahendravarman I: 600–630
- Narasimhavarman I: 630–668
- Mahendravarman II: 668–670
- Parameswaravarman I: 670–695
- Narasimhavarman II: 695–728
- Paramesvaravarman II: 728–731
- Nandivarman II: 731–795
- Dantivarman: 795–846
- Nandivarman III: 846–869
- Nriputungavarman: 869–880
- Aparajita Varman: 880–897

Mahendravarman II or Mahendra Varma II was a Pallava monarch who reigned in southern India from 668 to 669. He was the son of Narasimhavarman I, who reigned in southern India from 630 to 668. He was succeeded by his son Paramesvaravarman I.

Mahendravarman II Pallava dynasty
| Preceded by Narasimhavarman I | Pallava dynasty 668–669 | Succeeded by Paramesvaravarman I |
