= Mahendravarman I =

Pallava emperor from 590 to 630

- Mattavilasa , gunabhara , Kurrambu , Chitrakapuli and Vancha - valava ( valava = Chola )
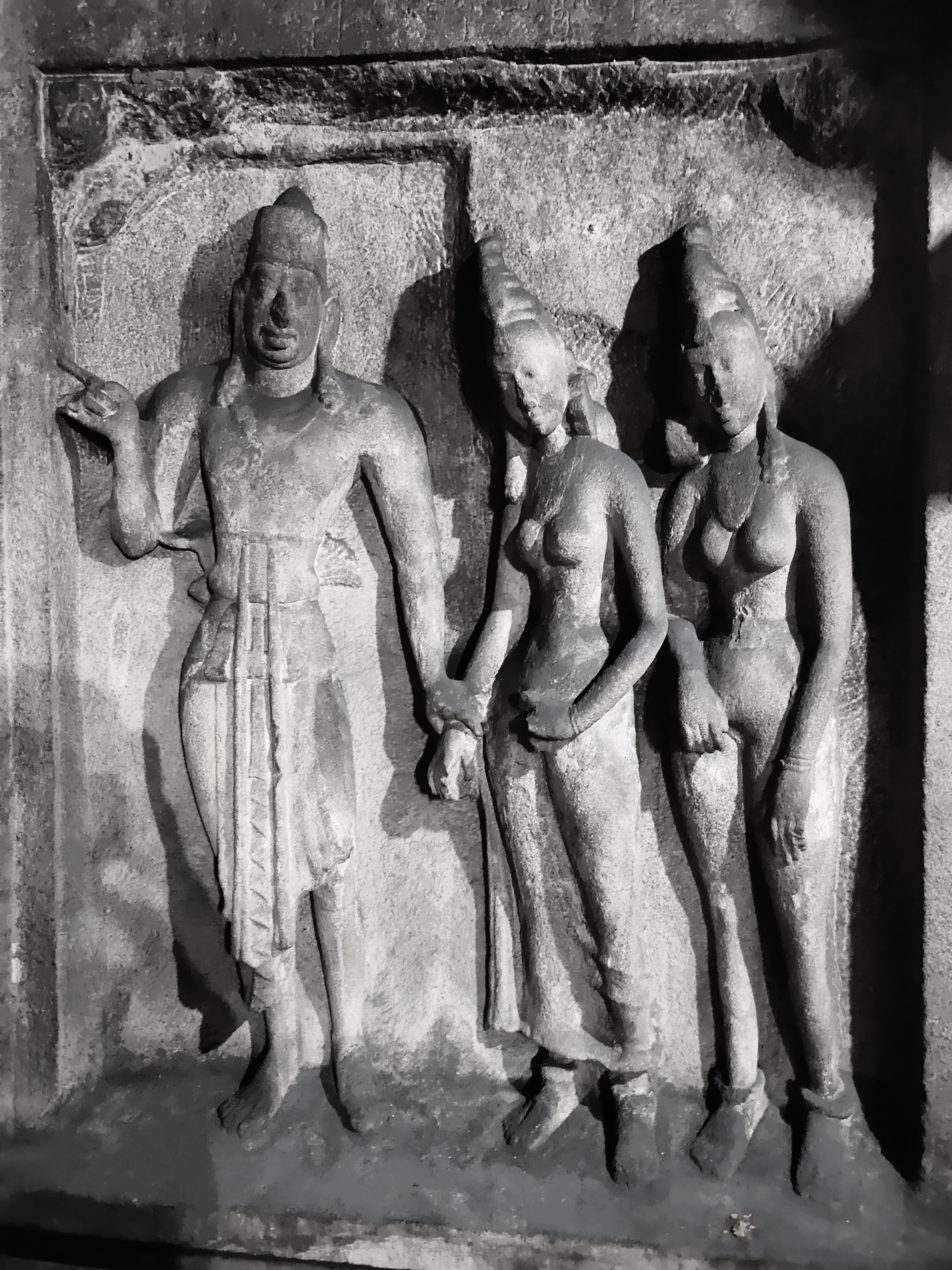
- Sculpture of Mahendravarman I with his queens at Varaha Cave Temple.

Pallava emperor
- Reign: 590–630
- Predecessor: Simhavishnu
- Successor: Narasimhavarman I
- Issue: Narasimhavarman I
- Dynasty: Pallava
- Father: Simhavishnu
- Mother: Daughter of Vikramendra Varma II
- Religion: Jainism; Shaivism

Pallava Monarchs (3rd–9th Century CE)
- Virakurcha: (Unknown)
- Vishnugopa I: (Unknown)
- Vishnugopa II: (Unknown)
- Simhavarman III: (Unknown)
- Simhavishnu: 575–600
- Mahendravarman I: 600–630
- Narasimhavarman I: 630–668
- Mahendravarman II: 668–670
- Parameswaravarman I: 670–695
- Narasimhavarman II: 695–728
- Paramesvaravarman II: 728–731
- Nandivarman II: 731–795
- Dantivarman: 795–846
- Nandivarman III: 846–869
- Nriputungavarman: 869–880
- Aparajita Varman: 880–897

Mahendravarman I (reigned 590–630) was a Pallava emperor who ruled over a realm covering the southern portions of present-day Andhra region and northern regions of what forms present-day Tamil Nadu in India, in the early 7th century. He was a scholar, a painter, an architect and a musician. He was the son of Simhavishnu, who defeated the Kalabhras and re-established the Pallava kingdom.

During his reign, the Chalukya monarch Pulakeshin II attacked the Pallava realm. The Pallavas fought a series of wars in the northern Vengi region, before Mahendravarman decimated his chief enemies at Pullalur (according to Pallava grants at Kuram, Kasakudi and Tadantottam). Although Mahendravarman saved his capital, he lost the northern provinces to Pulakeshin. Tamil literature flourished under his rule, with the rise in popularity of Tevaram written by Appar and Sambandhar. Mahendravarman I was the author of the play Mattavilasa Prahasana which is a Sanskrit satire. During his period "Bhagavadajjukam", another satire (prahasanam), was written by Bodhayana. King Mahendravarman mentioned this on a stone inscription in Mamandur along with his own Mattavilasa Prahasanam.

Mahendravarman was succeeded to the throne by his more famous son Narasimhavarman I in 630 CE, who defeated Pulakeshin II of the Chalukya dynasty and ransacked the Chalukyan capital city of Vatapi (also known as Badami).

== Patronage of arts and architecture ==
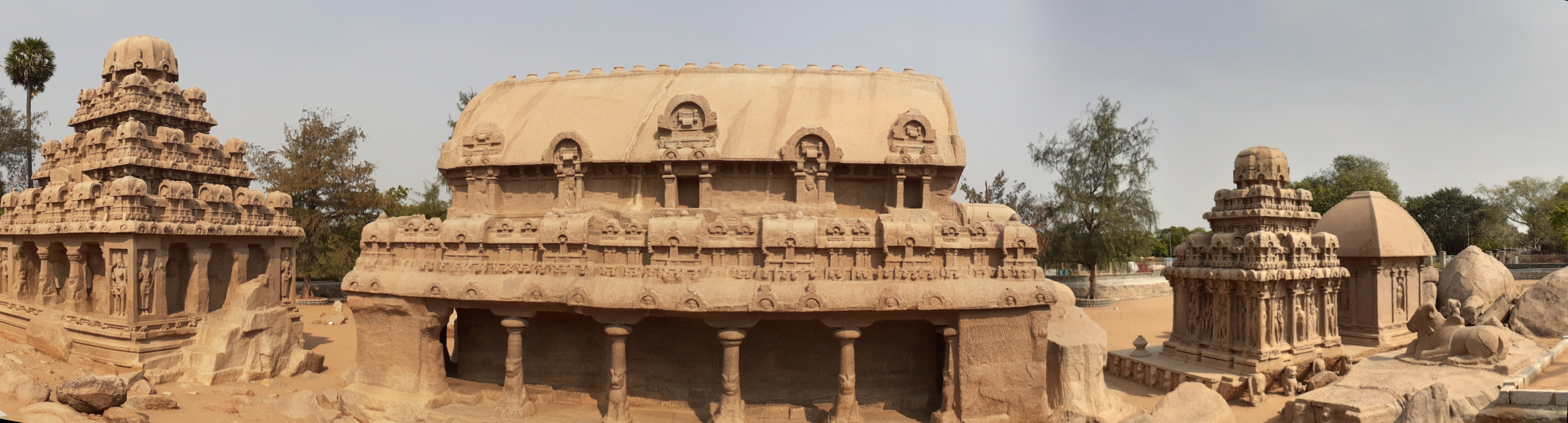
Bhima Ratha, which is part of the Pancha Rathas group of monuments, located in Mahabalipuram (Mamallapuram), Tamil Nadu, India.

Construction of these started in the reign of Mahendravarma I. Mahendravarman was a great patron of letters and architecture. He constructed the Mamallapuram Lighthouse and Kanchi University where Vedas, Buddhism, Jainism, Painting, Music & Dance were taught. He was the pioneer of the Rock-cut Architecture amongst the Pallavas. The inscription at the rock-cut Mandagapattu Tirumurti Temple hails him as Vichitrachitta and claims that the temple was built without wood, brick, mortar or metal. The five-celled cave temple at Pallavaram was also built during his reign as was the Kokarneswarar Temple, Thirukokarnam of Pudukottai, Tamil Nadu. He made Kudimiya malai Inscription. His paintings are found in Sittanavasal Cave (Tamil Nadu).

Fine examples of his rock-cut temples can be witnessed at Mahabalipuram, (Satyagirinathar and Satyagirishwarar twin temples), Seeyamangalam (the Avanibhajana Pallaveswaram Siva temple) in North Arcot district and the upper rock-cut temple at Trichy. Apart from the Siva temples, Mahendravarma also excavated a few Vishnu cave temples, the Mahendravishnugrha at Mahendravadi, and the Ranganatha Temple at Singavaram in present-day Gingee (then North Arcot district).

He was also the author of the play Mattavilasa Prahasana, a farce concerning Buddhist and Saiva ascetics. He is also claimed to be the author of another play called Bhagavadajjuka,. This is evident by the inscriptions found at Mamandur cave shrines (near Kanchipuram - this place is mentioned as Dusi Mamandur to avoid confusions with other places by the same name). However, there is an alternate view that attributes this play to Bodhayana.

== Religion ==
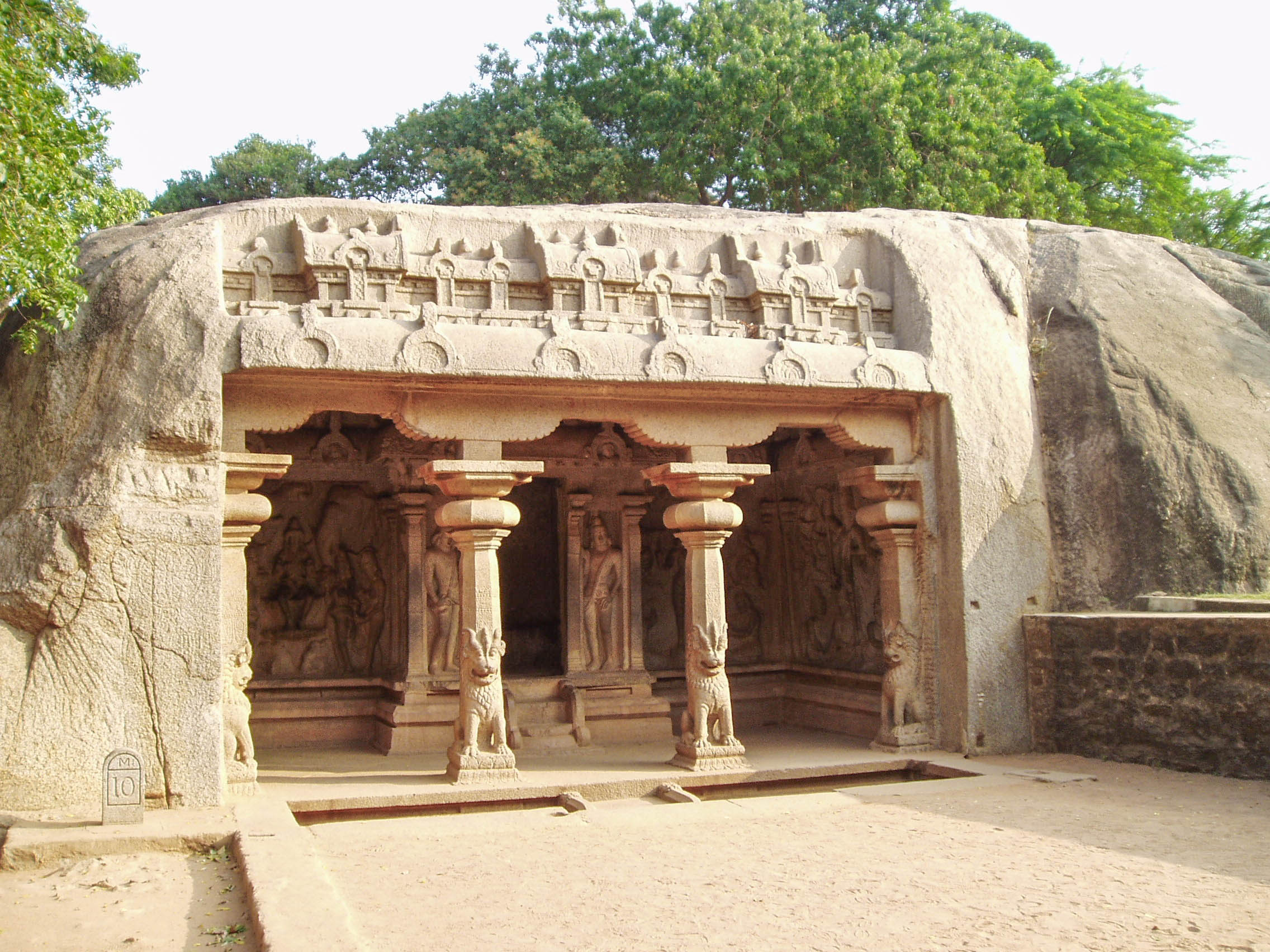
Varaha Cave Temple built by Mahendravarman I

Mahendravarman was initially a patron of Jainism, but he converted to the Shaiva tradition under the influence of the Shaiva saint Appar. According to Divyacharitam, a Sanskrit work on the life of Alvars that was written in 12th century, the image of Yatotkara Perumal (Vishnu), enshrined in Kanchipuram, was carried out of the city along with his devotee Tirumalisai Alvar, because the latter faced persecution and exile from the king, who had at least temporarily come under the influence of Jainism.

== In literature and popular culture ==
Mahendravarman I is a prominent character in Tamil historical fiction. The novel Sivagamiyin Sapatham by Kalki Krishnamurthy, talks about the first Vatapi invasion into the Pallava Kingdom, Mahendravarman's heroic deeds in the war, securing the Kanchi fort from the imminent invasion of the huge Vatapi army, his loss to the Vatapi Pulikesi, and eventual death. The inscriptions in Madangapattu mention him as a curious king who wanted to discard perishable materials like wood, brick, metal, or mortar for building temples. He was a pioneer in the use of rock-cut inscriptions. Literature also mentions that he built the famous Mahendratankta, the famous irrigation tank. He initiated most of the monuments in Mahabalipuram, which, in modern times, are grouped as Group of Monuments at Mahabalipuram, and is a UNESCO World Heritage site.

== Notes ==
Mahendravarman I Pallava dynasty
Preceded by Simhavishnu	Pallava dynasty 600–630	Succeeded by Narasimhavarman I
