= Aparajita Varman =

Last Pallava emperor (r. 880–897)

Pallava King
- Reign: c. 880 – c. 897
- Predecessor: Nandivarman III
- Successor: Dynasty abolished (Aditya I of the Chola Empire)
- Dynasty: Pallava
- Father: Kampavarman
- Mother: Vijaya
- Religion: Hinduism

Pallava Monarchs (200s–800s CE)
- Virakurcha: (??–??)
- Vishnugopa I: (??–??)
- Vishnugopa II: (??–??)
- Simhavarman III: (??–??)
- Simhavishnu: 575–600
- Mahendravarman I: 600–630
- Narasimhavarman I: 630–668
- Mahendravarman II: 668–670
- Parameswaravarman I: 670–695
- Narasimhavarman II: 695–728
- Paramesvaravarman II: 728–731
- Nandivarman II: 731–795
- Dantivarman: 795–846
- Nandivarman III: 846–869
- Nriputungavarman: 869–880
- Aparajita Varman: 880–897

Aparajita Varman (reigned 880–897), commonly referred to as Aparajita, was a king of the Pallava dynasty. He was the son of Kampavarman and the Ganga princess Vijaya. Considered the last known Pallava ruler, he was defeated and killed in c. 897 CE in a battle against Aditya I. Pallava rule over Tondaimandalam came to an end thereafter, as the Pallava territories were annexed into the Chola Empire. In 880 CE, Aparajita fought a battle against the Pandya ruler Varagunavarman II and defeated him.

== Reign ==
A Somaskanda depiction on the rear wall of the sanctum of a temple commissioned by him in Tiruttani is regarded as the last known use of that stylistic tradition. In 885, he transferred the rule of Thanjavur to his ally and vassal Aditya I as a reward for his contribution to the victory at Thirupurambiyam. The Cholas under Aditya I at first were minor allies of the Pallavas, but later attacked them, defeated and killed Aparajitavarman, thus marking the end of the Pallava reign in Southern India.
