= Simhavarman III =

Pallava emperor from 525 to 555

Pallava King
- Reign: c. 525–555
- Predecessor: Nandi Varman I
- Successor: Simhavishnu
- Issue: Simhavishnu
- Dynasty: Pallava
- Father: Vishnugopa III
- Religion: Hinduism

Pallava Monarchs (200s–800s CE)
- Virakurcha: (??–??)
- Vishnugopa I: (??–??)
- Vishnugopa II: (??–??)
- Simhavarman III: (??–??)
- Simhavishnu: 575–600
- Mahendravarman I: 600–630
- Narasimhavarman I: 630–668
- Mahendravarman II: 668–670
- Parameswaravarman I: 670–695
- Narasimhavarman II: 695–728
- Paramesvaravarman II: 728–731
- Nandivarman II: 731–795
- Dantivarman: 795–846
- Nandivarman III: 846–869
- Nriputungavarman: 869–880
- Aparajita Varman: 880–897

Simhavarman III was a ruler of the Pallava dynasty who reigned from 525 to 555. He was the father and predecessor of Simhavishnu, who eventually established the Greater Pallava line.

According to the Sivan Vāyil inscription, Simhavarman III was a devout ruler who performed several Vedic sacrifices, including 10 Aśvamedha (Daśāśvamedha), Bahusuvarṇa, and Kratu sacrifices.

== Notes ==
Simhavarman III Pallava dynasty
Regnal titles
| Preceded by Nandi Varman I | King of the Pallava Dynasty c. 525–555 | Succeeded by Simhavishnu |
