= Mahendravadi =

Mahendravadi Mahendrapura
- village
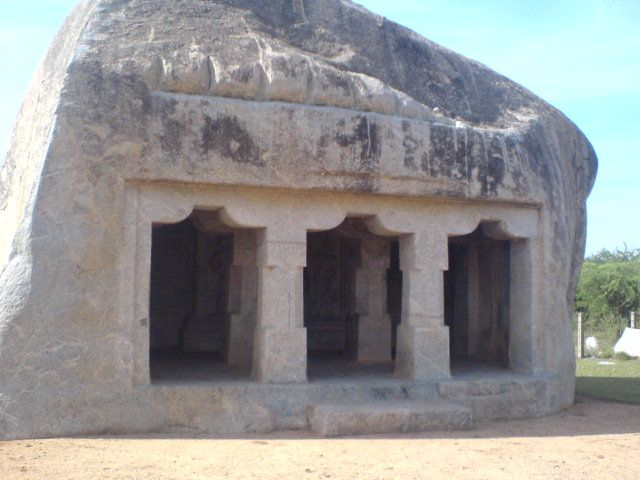
- Single rock cut temple by Pallava Varman

- Location in Tamil Nadu, India Mahendravadi (India)
- Coordinates: 12°59′30″N 79°32′0″E
- Country: India
- State: Tamil Nadu
- District: Ranipet
- Founder: Mahendra Varman 1

Languages
  - Official: Tamil
- Time zone: UTC+5:30 (IST)
- PIN: 632502
- Vehicle registration: TN-73
- Lok Sabha constituency: Arakkonam Lok Sabha constituency

Mahendravadi is a historical ancient 6th Century Pallava Dynasty town during Mahendra Varman 1, in Nemili taluk, Tamil Nadu, in northern Tamil Nadu of India.

== History ==
The history of Mahendravadi records from 600 AD (6th Century) through Pallava Kingdom's owned dynasty inscription preserved till date as Monument by Govt Of India, Archeological Dept. Living evidences/Monuments from of early pallava dynasty owned Mahendravadi traces from the Pallava Greatest Emperor Mahendravarman I (600-630 AD). Mahendravarman I established Mahendravadi town as one of the second largest town during rule and it is a starting point of the Pallava's rock cut sculptures history that we see in Kanchipuram and Mamallapuram. The very first Rock cut Sculpture Monuments of Pallava's dynasty originated from this erstwhile town now as village. The enhanced sculptures are exercised and improvised by his son Narashima Varman who shifted the capitol of pallava's dynasty from kachipuram to mamallapuram. This is the first and unique rock cut temple that the Emperor Mahendra Varman had created during his period of ruling of his extended dynasty from Cauvery river to Krishna river region (Now in Tamil Nadu, Andhra Pradesh and Karnataka state). The old name of Mahendravadi was Mahendrapura and as per 1881 district gazetteer of British India tells that once the village was a large extended town reduced to smaller. It also describe the village tank stating the date of this fine tank was unknown and it used to serve lands some 10-15 miles distance. The town was considerable importance to provide a fort in the during his rule. A mud bank large tank referred to as Mahendra-Tataka in the inscription in Grantha Script was also excavated by the king Mahendra Varman to serve water resources for extensive agriculture. The history of the mud bunk lake was well articulated in one of the well known Novel - "Sivagamiyin Sapadham" (The Wow of Sivagami) Sivagamiyin Sapatham written by Kalki Krishnamoorthi in the first episode.

The artisans of Pallavas in 6th Century excavated a free boulder, scenic monolithic rock cut temple which is now preserved by Archeological Survey of India. The eastern phase of this boulder was even out and carved with a temple consisting three Mandapa. The foundation inscription details in Pallava Grantha Script, a Tamil Language -"Splitting the rock, Gunabhara casyed to be made on (the tank) the Mahendra Tataka(Tank) in the great (City of) Mahendrapura this Solid, Spacious temple of Murari, Named Mahendra Vishnu Graha, which is highly praised by good people,(and which is) an abode of beauty pleasing the eyes of Men"

Mamallapuram finds a prominent place in the tourist map of the world. Even today, their temples and sculptures stand testimony to the cultural achievements of the Pallavas. Presence of Pallavas can be seen in Mahandravadi. An ancient cave temple of the 7th century (monolithic rock cut temple) is under the control of the Archaeological Survey of India (ASI). Maintenance is handled by ASI.

== Education ==
Mahendravadi has a primary and higher secondary school run by state government. The quality of education and pass percentage is always higher level compare to any other schools in this region. For further graduation and higher education, the students have to go to the nearby towns Ranipet, Arakkonam, Sholinghur, Arcot, Walajapet, kancheepuram and chennai.

== Transport ==
Mahendravadi is well-connected by bus to the nearby towns Nemili, Banavaram, Sholinghur and Arakonam. Every 30 minutes to 45 minutes the buses ply operated by state government transport corporation and private bus operators.

There is a railway station called "Mahendravadi" at 2.5 kilometres (1.6 mi) distance. However, usage of the railway is not great. Banavaram (Sholighur) railway station is the nearest railway station where Lalbaugh Express (Chennai-Bangalore), Kaveri Express (Chennai-bangalore), Yelagiri Express (Jolarpet-Chennai), Katpadi-Arakonam Passenger, Arakonam-Bangalore Passenger and Jolarpet-Arakonam Express. For the past few years sub-urban train service has been extended from Katpadi to Chennai as well.

Frequently you will find share auto's runs between Nemili to Banavaram. Hence reaching Mahendravadi is just like in frequency of 10–15 minutes.

== Economy ==
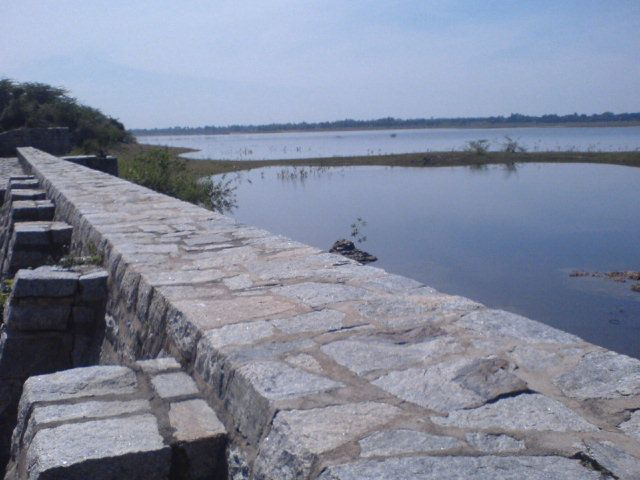
Historical Lake – view

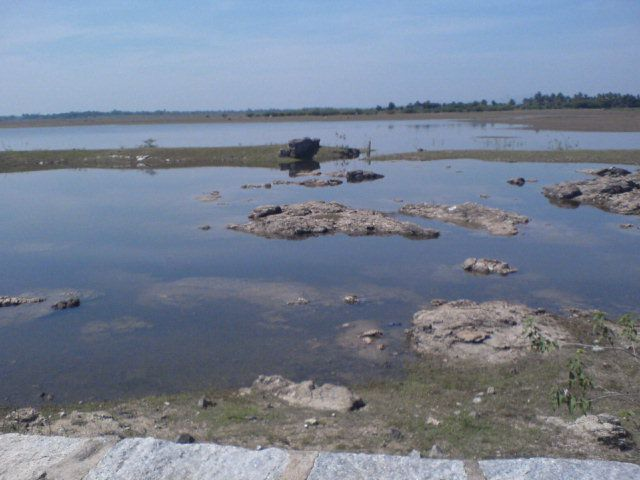
Historical monuments

Farming is the major source of income for the people, and they are all dependent on lake irrigation as well as bore well water. Paddy (Wetland), Groundnut and Sesame (Dry Land region) are the major crops cultivated. However, the catchment area for the historical pallava king made lake is occupied by small hamlets thus making the region very poor for rain water conservation. The lake region is slowly encroached by people. Moreover, the sand sediments of the lake have not been cleared for many decades.

There has been a direct canal from Palar river to Mahendravadi lake, which was natural water flow from Anaicut of Palar river. The main source of water through north east monsoon are the rains from October to December. However, the rainfall is far below average of north east monsoon fall.

The lake is fully dependent on Palar water, and the dark side is "palar river itself is a dry river".

The lake has been capable of supplying water resources to seven other lakes below its lake bed villages.

After 14 years, the lake overflowed on 24 November 2015. It is nice tourist attraction now. Whenever the lake gets full, three time crop yield is assured for the farmers in the lake region. Once again in October 2021 the lake flooded as heavy rainfall over the catchment area.

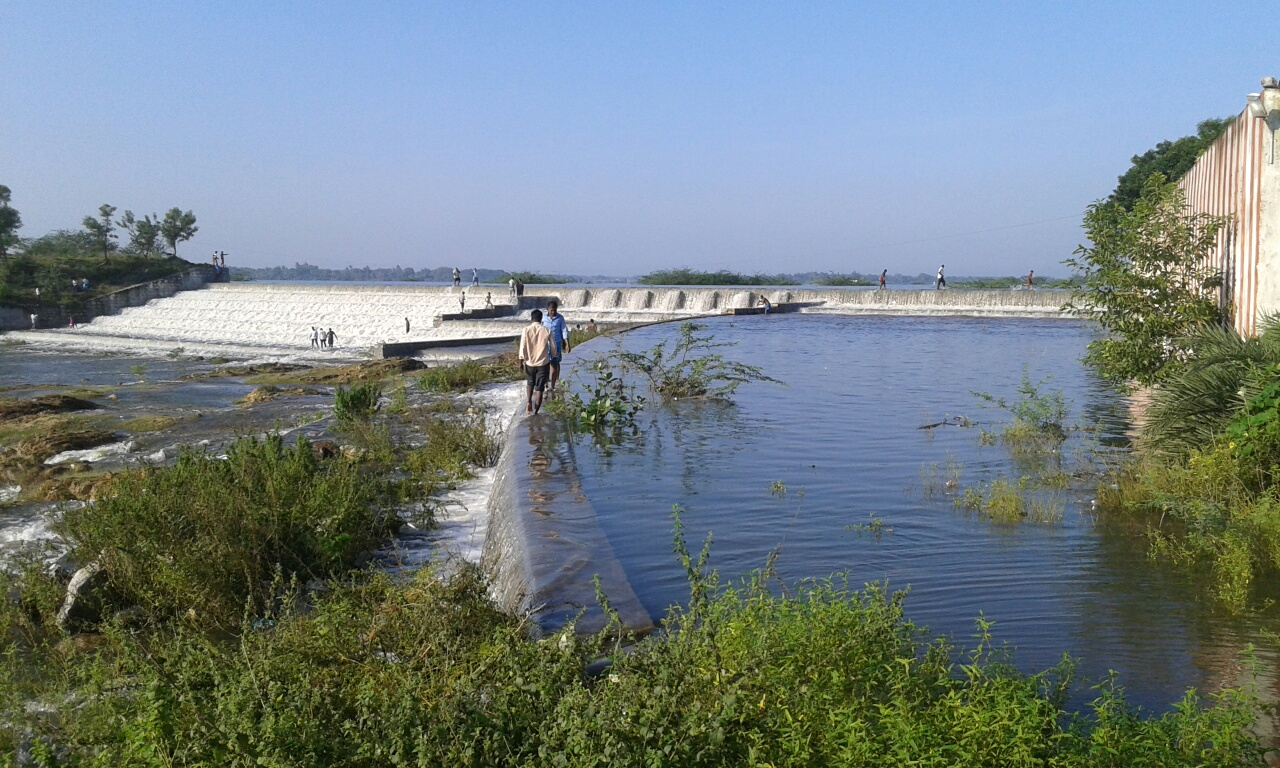
Lake view

== Temples and festivals ==
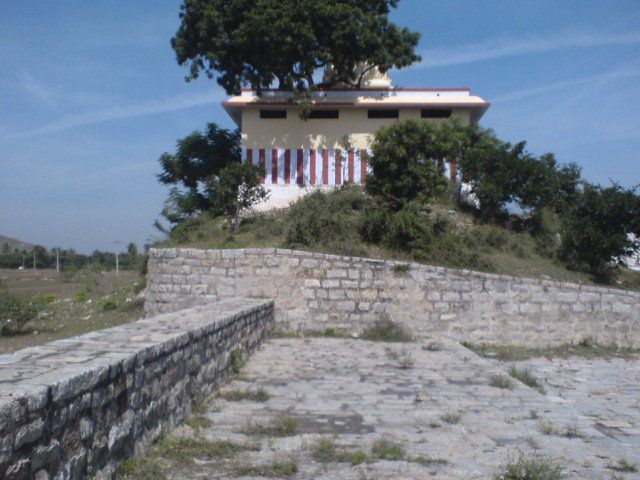
Temple and Lake view

There are many centuries-old temples in the village. The village has historical Siva and Vishnu temples, which have the heritage and culture. Every year, Karthikai festival was the lime light in these two temples, in the way it was performed in Thiruvannamalai.

The village people have great respect and worship for "Madhagukatha Amman" (the goddess who takes care of the lake and reservoir gate) which is located on the lake crest. There is a yearly festival for the goddess. The festival is celebrated over two days, and during this period, all family members join to pray to the goddess for their health and wealth. For the past 5 years, this festival has been celebrated for 4 days.

During the festival procession (Urchava Veedhi Ula), scheduled castes are given the first right to worship. After the deity's idol is transported from the lakeside temple to the village entrance, the processions begin. The festive processions include offering garlands & pongal, and decorating several areas.

Newly married couples offer their "mangal suthra" (thaali) to the goddess and tie the new "mangal suthra".

Every Amavasai (new moon day), full night festivities occur at the temple and thousands of devotees go and spend the entire night at the temple.

Pongal is another grand festival in the village, similarly to the rest of Tamil Nadu. It is a 4 or 5 day festival.
