= Simhavarman I =

Pallava emperor from 275 to 300

- Reign: 275–300
- Predecessor: Position established
- Successor: Sivaskandavarman
- House: Pallava

Simhavarman I (IAST: Siṃha Varmā) was the earliest recorded Pallava king. His only inscription was found at Manchikallu village in Palnadu district of Andhra Pradesh.

== Life ==
His land grants are mentioned in Vilavatti inscription.
