= Mattavilasa Prahasana =

7th-century Sanskrit play by Mahendravarman I

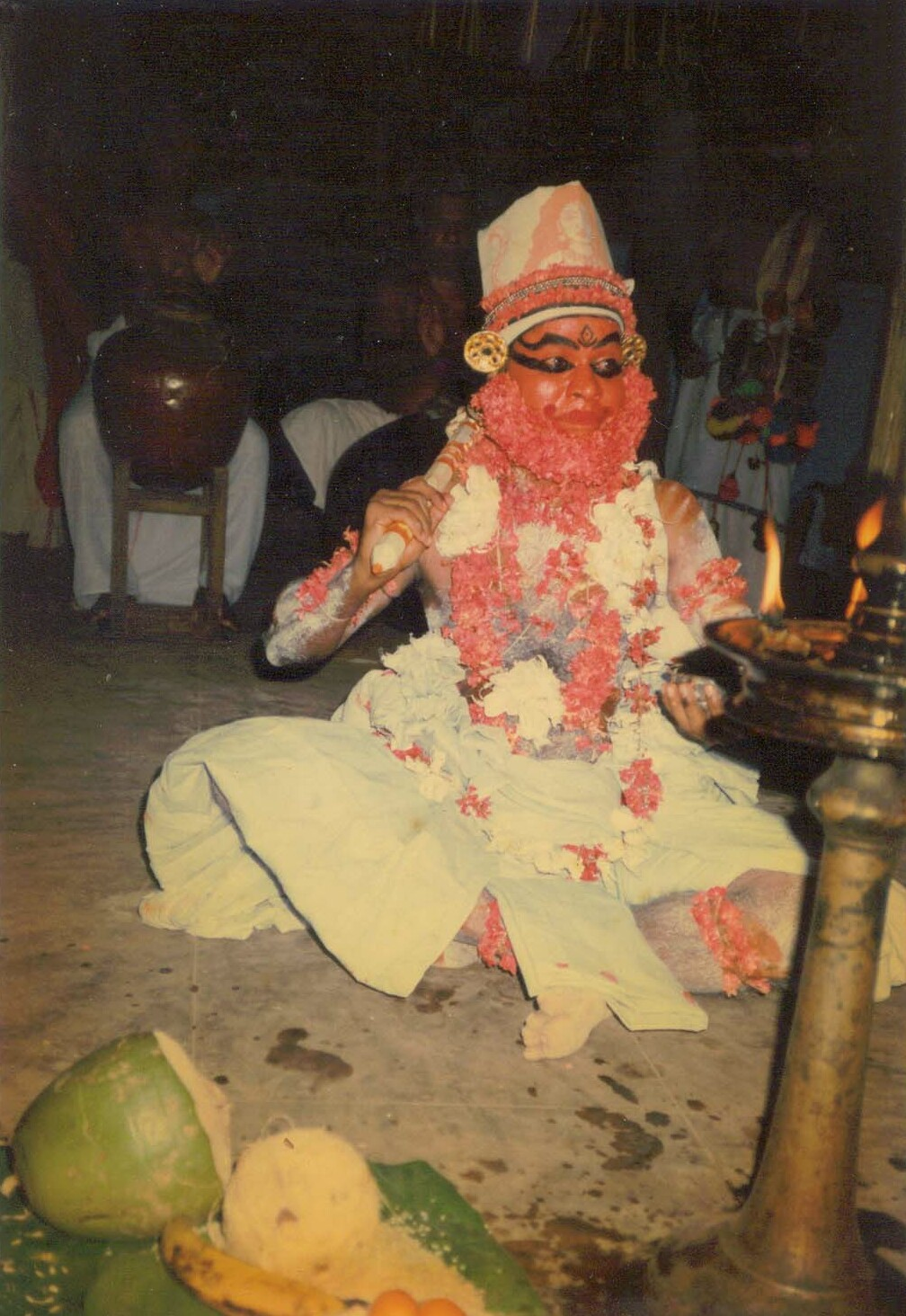
Mattavilasaprahasana in ancient Sanskrit theatre tradition Kutiyattam performed at temples in northern Kerala: Artist:Mani Damodara Chakyar as Kapali.

Mattavilasa Prahasana (Devanagari:मत्तविलासप्रहसन), (English: A Farce of Drunken Sport) is a short one-act Sanskrit play. It is one of the two great one act plays written by Pallava King Mahendravarman I (571– 630CE) in the beginning of the seventh century in southern India.

Mattavilasa Prahasana is a satire that pokes fun at the peculiar aspects of the heretic Kapalika and Pasupata Saivite sects, Buddhists and Jainism. The setting of the play is Kanchipuram, the capital city of the Pallava kingdom in the seventh century. The play revolves around the drunken antics of a Kapalika mendicant, Satyasoma, his woman, Devasoma, and the loss and recovery of their skull-bowl. The cast of characters consists of Kapali or Satysoma, an unorthodox Saivite mendicant, Devasoma, Satysoma’s female partner, a Buddhist Monk, whose name is Nagasena, Pasupata, a member of another unorthodox Saivite order and a Madman. The act describes a dispute between a drunken Kapali and the Buddhist monk. The inebriated Kapali suspects the Buddhist monk of stealing his begging bowl made from a skull, but after a drawn-out argument it is found to have been taken away by a dog.

== Synopsis ==
Mattavilasa Prahasana opens with the entering of two drunken Kapalikas, Satyasoma and his woman, Devasoma. Full of drunken antics, they stumble from tavern to tavern searching for more alcohol. The Kapalikas are told to be followers of a heretic Saivite sect whose rites included drinking, wild dancing and singing, and ritual intercourse with their partners. As Satysoma asks for more alms, he realizes that he has lost his sacred skull-bowl. Devasoma suggests that he might have left it at the tavern they previously visited. To their dismay, it was not there. Satyasoma suspects that either a dog or a Buddhist monk has taken it.

A Buddhist monk, Nagasena, enters the stage and the Kapalika suggests that he is the culprit-the one who has stolen the skull-bowl. Satyasoma criticizes the Buddhist monk by saying that he steals, lies, and desires liquor, meat and women even though his religion prohibits it. As for Buddhism itself, the Kapali accuses it of stealing ideas from the Mahabharata and the Vedanta. Satyasoma argues with the monk who denies the accusations and the dispute eventually leads to a physical brawl. As the fighting escalates, another mendicant, a Pasupata acquaintance of Satyasoma's, enters and mediates the situation. The drawn-out argument continues until the Buddhist monk, in despair, gives his begging bowl to a delusional Satyasoma.

The Madman enters the stage and in his hand is Satyasoma's real skull-bowl. The madman recovered the bowl from a dog and the skull-bowl is finally returned to its rightful owner. There is a resolution and all characters leave in an amicable fashion.

== Interpretations ==
There was a strong revivalist movement of Hinduism in southern India during the seventh century and King Mahendra supported this revivalism. He excavated temples in mountains, a majority of which were dedicated to Siva. It is within this atmosphere of this enlightenment when Mahendra’s play, Mattavilasa Prahasana, had its greatest effect.

It is widely held that Mahendra’s play is a satire of the degenerate sects of his day. For example, both the Kapalika and Pasupata sects must have been considered peculiar during Mahendra’s reign, and the king satirizes them in his play. The Kapalikas embodied a serious, yet suspect, religious concept: Tantrism where religious enlightenment is attained through unorthodox rituals. Some of these notorious rituals were Madya (liquor) and Maithuna (ritual intercourse). Meanwhile, these rituals are satirically echoed by Nagasena, the Buddhist monk, who wonders why Buddhism disallows liquor and women. Jainism isn’t spared from Mahendra’s satirical pen as both Devasoma and Satyasoma describe Jains as heretics.

While the play does have a satirical plot, it also provides an interesting look into the life at Kanchipuram during the seventh century. There are references to the sounds of drums, young ladies and various flower shops. The King points to the festive climate within taverns and to the corrupted courts of Kanchi where officials were sometimes bribed. There is also mention of temple towers.

Satyasoma accuses the Buddha of stealing ideas from the Vedanta and Mahabharata. This remark has a bearing on the age of the Mahabharata battle and its epic story.

== Adaptations ==
A 2003 dance theatre adaptation of Mattavilasa Prahasanam was produced and presented by SANGALPAM. There was a national United Kingdom tour between 2003-2004. Directed by Stella Uppal-Subbiah, the play was edited to highlight bharatanatyam, and received great reviews.

== Translations ==
- Mattavilasa Prahasana The Farce of Drunken Sport (1981) by Michael Lockwood and A. Vishnu Bhat
- Drunken Games (2001) by David Lorenzen, edited by David Gordon White
- The Farce of Drunken Sport (2003) by Stella Uppal-Subbiah [Theatrical Adaptation]
- Mattavilasa Prahasana (1936) by N.P. Unni and Narayanan Parameswaran
- Mahendravikrama Varmana (1998) by Urmibhushna Gupta
- High Spirits (1990, 1992) by Rahul Bonner

== See also ==
- Kapalika
- Kutiyattam
