= Simhavarman II =

- Reign: 436 - 477 AD
- Coronation: 436 AD
- Predecessor: Skandavarman III
- Successor: Skandavarman IV
- Issue: Skandavarman IV
- House: Pallava dynasty
- Father: Skandavarman III
- Religion: Buddhism

Simhavarman II was a ruler of the Pallava Dynasty of Kanchipuram.

== Biography ==
Simhavarman II was the son of Skandavarman III. Simhavarman II was a Buddhist unlike most other Pallava Kings who were predominantly orthodox Hindus.

== Date of Ascension ==
Rishi Simhasuri or Simhasura made a translation of Lokavibhaga, apparently from the Prakrit into Sanskrit. The work is said to have been finally copied some considerable time before the date of the copy (pura) by Muni Sarvanandin in the village named Patalika (Tiruppadiripuliyur; Cuddalore New Town) in 25 the Panarashtra (Bana country); then follows the date of the completion of this task. It was in the year 22 of Simhavarman, the Lord of Kanchi, and in the year 80 past 300 of the Saka year; in other words Saka 380 (458 CE).

Simhavarman II Pallava dynasty
Preceded by Skandavarman III	Pallava King; 4th Century AD	Succeeded by Skandavarman IV

== See also ==
- Pallava Dynasty
