= A History of South India: From Prehistoric Times to the Fall of Vijayanagar =

Book by K.A. Nilakanta Sastri

- Paperback edition
- Author: K. A. Nilakanta Sastri
- Illustrator: R. Nagaswamy
- Language: English
- Subject: History of South India
- Publisher: Oxford
- Publication date: 1955
- Publication place: India
- Media type: Print
- ISBN: 0195606868

A History of South India: From Prehistoric Times to the Fall of Vijayanagar is a book of history written by Indian historian K. A. Nilakanta Sastri. First published as a book in 1955, revised editions were brought out in 1958, 1966 and the last, just before the author's death in 1975. A History of South India is widely recognized as a classic and was the standard textbook in colleges for teaching South Indian history for over four decades.

== Evolution ==
The first manuscript of A History of South India was completed in August 1947. In a preface dated 10 August 1947, Sastri acknowledges the assistance rendered by his co-faculty in the University of Madras - V. Kalyanasundaram of the Geography department in preparation of maps and T. R. Chintamani and V. Raghavan of the Sanskrit department, S. Vaiyapuri Pillai of the Tamil, M. Mariappa Bhat of the Kannada department, N. Venkataramanayya of the Telugu department and P. Krishna Nayar of Malayalam department for their assistance in writing a chapter on literature of South India in which the literatures of individual South Indian languages were expounded in detail. However, Sastri absolves them on any responsibility regarding the opinions expressed in the book.

The first edition was published in 1955, a revised edition in 1958 and a second revision in 1966. For the third and final revision brought in 1975, Sastri included details of the latest advancements made in the decipherment of the Tamil-Brahmi script by Iravatham Mahadevan. In the preface to the edition, Sastri acknowledged the help rendered by historian R. Nagaswamy.

== Chapters ==
The book is made up of a total of sixteen chapters.

1. Survey of the Sources
2. The Land in relation to history
3. The earliest peoples and cultures
4. The dawn of history: Aryanization
5. The Age of the Mauryan Empire
6. The Satavahanas and their Successors
7. The Age of the Sangam and after
8. Conflict of three empires
9. The Balance of two empires
10. The Age of the Four Kingdoms
11. The Bahmanis and the Rise of Vijayanagar
12. The Empire of Vijayanagar
13. Social and economic conditions
14. Literature
15. Religion and philosophy
16. Art and architecture

== Features ==
In an introduction to the 2003 impression based on the 1975 edition, historian R. Champakalakshmi of the Jawaharlal Nehru University (JNU) asserts that the book enthused history students to study the history of South India which had so far been neglected by other historians. At the same time, in view of the sweeping changes made in the field of history studies since the 1960s, Champakalakshmi classifies the book as traditional and outdated along with works of Robert Sewell, T. V. Mahalingam and C. Minakshi. Champakalakshmi, however, admits that the dates given in the work have remained largely relevant and unchanged and praises Sastri's mastery of primary sources.

According to Carla M. Sinopoli, in his book, Sastri showered unequal praise on the Chola and Vijayanagar empires. The unequal attention given to political history than economic matters in the book has also been considerably criticized.

In a preface to the book, historian Sanjay Subrahmanyam considers the book as

... a classic work, which retains its importance and has never quite been replaced. It shows the author's mastery over a huge set of sources, which placed him head and shoulders above other South Indian historians of his time

Kesavan Veluthat feels that

The scope of this classic is so magisterial and its sweep so breathtaking that the quantitative addition of information and qualitative change in the knowledge in the field have not yet bettered it in half a century of its circulation. Nor is an alternative to this brilliant narrative in sight
