= Vishnugopa I =

4th-century Pallava emperor of Kanchipuram

- King of Kanchi

Pallava king
- Reign: c. 340–345 AD
- Predecessor: Buddhavarman
- Successor: Kumaravishnu I
- Dynasty: Pallava
- Father: Buddhavarman

Vishnugopa I (IAST: Viṣṇugopa) was a ruler of the Pallava dynasty based in Kanchipuram during the 4th century. He was the son and successor of Buddhavarman.

== Conflict with Samudragupta ==
Vishnugopa I is historically significant for his encounter with the Gupta Emperor Samudragupta during the latter's southern expedition (Dakshinapatha).

According to the Allahabad stone pillar inscription, Vishnugopa was one of the twelve southern kings defeated by Samudragupta but was subsequently released and reinstated as a tributary ruler, a policy known as grahana-moksha-anugraha (capturing, releasing, and favoring).

The inscription (lines 19–20) mentions:

Whose magnanimity blended with valour was caused by (his) first capturing, and thereafter showing the favour of releasing, all the kings of Dakshiṇāpatha such as Mahēndra of Kōsala... Vishṇugōpa of Kāñchī, Nīlarāja of Avamukta, Hastivarman of Vēṅgī...

== Succession ==
Vishnugopa I Pallava dynasty
Preceded by Buddhavarman	Pallava King c. 340–345 AD	Succeeded by Kumaravishnu I

== See also ==
- Pallava dynasty
- Samudragupta
- Dakshinapatha
