= List of Monuments of National Importance in Chennai circle =

This is a list of Monuments of National Importance (ASI) as officially recognized by and available through the website of the Archaeological Survey of India for the Chennai Circle in the Indian state of Tamil Nadu. The Circle has a total of 250 Monuments and Sites of National Importance.

== List of monuments in the Chennai circle ==
SL. No.	Description	Location	Address	District	Coordinates	Image
N-TN-C1	"Arsenal" between Wellesley house and Clive’s House with shells and cannons piled together near the Gateway Block IV/1 to12 and 14 to18.	Chennai		Chennai	13°04′41″N 80°17′06″E	"Arsenal" between Wellesley house and Clive’s House with shells and cannons piled together near the Gateway Block IV/1 to12 and 14 to18. More images
N-TN-C2	Big Warehouse, south of the Church Library (in Block No.II/7).	Chennai		Chennai	13°04′43″N 80°17′12″E	Upload Photo
N-TN-C3	Chaplain’s house including portion which is the northern side of the Old Wall II/1.	Chennai		Chennai		Chaplain’s house including portion which is the northern side of the Old Wall II/1. More images
N-TN-C4	Clive’s House built in 1753.	Chennai		Chennai	13°04′43″N 80°17′09″E	Clive’s House built in 1753. More images
N-TN-C5	Garrisons Engineer’s Depot, Block No.IV.	Chennai		Chennai		Upload Photo
N-TN-C6	Guard Room Block No.V.	Chennai		Chennai		Upload Photo
N-TN-C7	It’s Ramparts, gates, bastions, Ravelins with vaulted chambers and water cisterns underneath, moat and defence walls all round with glacis to the extent of the existing barbed wire fence.	Chennai		Chennai		It’s Ramparts, gates, bastions, Ravelins with vaulted chambers and water cisterns underneath, moat and defence walls all round with glacis to the extent of the existing barbed wire fence. More images
N-TN-C8	King’s Barracks Block No.XXV.	Chennai		Chennai	13°04′52″N 80°17′02″E	King’s Barracks Block No.XXV. More images
N-TN-C9	Last house on the left of ‘Snobs Allay’ (oldest house in the Fort with carved staircase) – Block No. I/I.	Chennai		Chennai		Upload Photo
N-TN-C10	Nursing Sister’s House (Block I/3).	Chennai		Chennai		Upload Photo
N-TN-C11	Old British Infantry Officers Mess (Now Archaeological Dept. Office & Fort Museum) Block XXXVI-2.	Chennai		Chennai	13°04′50″N 80°17′16″E	Old British Infantry Officers Mess (Now Archaeological Dept. Office & Fort Museum) Block XXXVI-2. More images
N-TN-C12	St. Mary’s Church with tablets laid on the ground and enclosed by a compound and a buried wall.	Chennai		Chennai	13°04′43″N 80°17′12″E	St. Mary’s Church with tablets laid on the ground and enclosed by a compound and a buried wall. More images
N-TN-C13	Tomb of Elihu Yale and Joseph Hymmners in the compound of Law College, George town	Law College, Chennai		Chennai	13°05′14″N 80°17′09″E	Tomb of Elihu Yale and Joseph Hymmners in the compound of Law College, George town More images
N-TN-C14	Wellesley’s House (Built in 1798), Block No.IV/13.	Chennai		Chennai		Upload Photo
N-TN-C15	Old Town Wall	Tondiarpet		Chennai	13°06′14″N 80°17′19″E	Upload Photo
N-TN-C16	Nithisvarasvami Temple	Srimushnam		Cuddalore	11°24′07″N 79°24′25″E	Nithisvarasvami Temple More images
N-TN-C17	Chennaraya Perumal Temple Together With Adjacent Lands	Adiyamankottai		Dharmapuri	12°04′29″N 78°07′08″E	Chennaraya Perumal Temple Together With Adjacent Lands More images
N-TN-C18	Jain Temple	Mettupudur		Erode	11°14′58″N 77°30′11″E	Jain Temple More images
N-TN-C19	Megalithic cists and cairns (survey no.222)	Agaram		Chengalpattu		Upload Photo
N-TN-C20	Megalithic cists and cairns (survey nos. 111 & 116)	Agaram		Chengalpattu		Upload Photo
N-TN-C21	Urn burials	Alattur		Chengalpattu		Upload Photo
N-TN-C22	Megalithic cists and cairns	Amur		Chengalpattu		Upload Photo
N-TN-C23	Megalithic cists and cairns	Anur		Chengalpattu	12°35′22″N 79°58′27″E	Upload Photo
N-TN-C24	Megalithic cists and cairns (Ownership: Private land)	Araiyapakkam		Chengalpattu		Upload Photo
N-TN-C25	Megalithic cists and cairns	Atcharavakkam		Chengalpattu		Upload Photo
N-TN-C26	Megalithic cists and cairns with stone circles	Ayyanjeri		Chengalpattu		Upload Photo
N-TN-C27	Megalithic Cairns and Cists	Edakunram		Chengalpattu		Upload Photo
N-TN-C28	Megalithic Cairns and Cists	Gudalur		Chengalpattu		Upload Photo
N-TN-C29	Megalithic cists and cairns with stone circles	Guduvancheri (Vallamjeri)		Chengalpattu		Upload Photo
N-TN-C30	Group of cairns	Kadapperi		Chengalpattu		Upload Photo
N-TN-C31	Cairns in the forest reserve at the foot of the Perumbair hills.	Kadmalaiputhur		Chengalpattu		Upload Photo
N-TN-C32	Chromlechs	Kadmalaiputhur		Chengalpattu		Upload Photo
N-TN-C33	Megalithic Cists and Cairns.	Kalanipakkam		Chengalpattu		Upload Photo
N-TN-C34	Megalithic cists and cairns	Kalathur		Chengalpattu		Upload Photo
N-TN-C35	Megalithic cists and cairns	Kalvay		Chengalpattu		Upload Photo
N-TN-C36	Cists and cairns	Kanakapattu		Chengalpattu		Upload Photo
N-TN-C37	Megalithic cists and cairns with Bounding stone circles.	Kandalur		Chengalpattu		Upload Photo
N-TN-C38	Megalithic cists and cairns with stone circles.	Kattuputhur		Chengalpattu		Upload Photo
N-TN-C39	Megalithic cairns and cists with stone circles.	Kilampakkam		Chengalpattu		Upload Photo
N-TN-C40	Megalithic cists and cairns	Kottamedu		Chengalpattu		Upload Photo
N-TN-C41	Megalithic cists and cairns	Kumili		Chengalpattu		Upload Photo
N-TN-C42	Megalithic cairns and cist with bounding circles.	Kunnavakkam		Chengalpattu	12°51′14″N 79°53′41″E	Upload Photo
N-TN-C43	Megalithic cists and cairns	Kuravanmedu		Chengalpattu		Upload Photo
N-TN-C44	a) Dhenupurisvara Temple, b)Graden attached to above temple	Madambakkam		Chengalpattu	12°53′55″N 80°09′37″E	a) Dhenupurisvara Temple, b)Graden attached to above temple More images
N-TN-C45	Megalithic cairns and cists with stone circles.	Madayathur		Chengalpattu		Upload Photo
N-TN-C46	Megalithic cists and cairns	Mailai		Chengalpattu		Upload Photo
N-TN-C47	Megalithic cists and cairns	Malaivaiyavur		Chengalpattu		Upload Photo
N-TN-C48	Aleva shore Temple	Mamallapuram		Chengalpattu	12°36′59″N 80°11′58″E	Aleva shore Temple More images
N-TN-C49	Arjuna’s Penance	Mamallapuram		Chengalpattu	12°37′04″N 80°11′33″E	Arjuna’s Penance More images
N-TN-C50	Arjuna’s Ratha	Mamallapuram		Chengalpattu	12°36′32″N 80°11′23″E	Arjuna’s Ratha More images
N-TN-C51	Bhima’s Ratha	Mamallapuram		Chengalpattu	12°36′32″N 80°11′22″E	Bhima’s Ratha More images
N-TN-C52	Dharmaraja’s Ratha	Mamallapuram		Chengalpattu	12°36′31″N 80°11′22″E	Dharmaraja’s Ratha More images
N-TN-C53	Dharmaraja Rock Cut Throne	Mamallapuram		Chengalpattu	12°37′05″N 80°11′29″E	Dharmaraja Rock Cut Throne More images
N-TN-C54	Dolostva Mandapa	Mamallapuram		Chengalpattu	12°37′02″N 80°11′39″E	Dolostva Mandapa More images
N-TN-C55	Draupadi’s Bath	Mamallapuram		Chengalpattu	12°37′04″N 80°11′29″E	Draupadi’s Bath More images
N-TN-C56	Draupathi Ratha	Mamallapuram		Chengalpattu	12°36′32″N 80°11′23″E	Draupathi Ratha More images
N-TN-C57	Eight Stone Images On A Masonry Platform Known As The Seven Pidaris	Mamallapuram		Chengalpattu	12°37′13″N 80°11′41″E	Eight Stone Images On A Masonry Platform Known As The Seven Pidaris More images
N-TN-C58	Huge Stone Figures Of The Lion, Elephant, And A Bull	Mamallapuram		Chengalpattu	12°36′32″N 80°11′23″E	Huge Stone Figures Of The Lion, Elephant, And A Bull More images
N-TN-C59	Olakkanesvara Temple	Mamallapuram		Chengalpattu	12°36′55″N 80°11′29″E	Olakkanesvara Temple More images
N-TN-C60	Kotikal Mandapa	Mamallapuram		Chengalpattu	12°37′11″N 80°11′32″E	Kotikal Mandapa More images
N-TN-C61	Krishna Mandapam	Mamallapuram		Chengalpattu	12°37′03″N 80°11′33″E	Krishna Mandapam More images
N-TN-C62	Krishna’s Butter Ball	Mamallapuram		Chengalpattu	12°37′09″N 80°11′32″E	Krishna’s Butter Ball More images
N-TN-C63	Large unfinished rock sculpture similar to Arjuna’s Penance near the light-house.	Mamallapuram		Chengalpattu	12°36′54″N 80°11′32″E	Large unfinished rock sculpture similar to Arjuna’s Penance near the light-house. More images
N-TN-C64	Mahishamardini Rock Cut Mandapa	Mamallapuram		Chengalpattu	12°37′00″N 80°11′30″E	Mahishamardini Rock Cut Mandapa More images
N-TN-C65	Mahishasura Mardini Rock Standing In The Sea To The North Of Shore Temple	Mamallapuram		Chengalpattu	12°37′02″N 80°11′57″E	Mahishasura Mardini Rock Standing In The Sea To The North Of Shore Temple More images
N-TN-C66	Mukundanayanar Temple	Mamallapuram		Chengalpattu	12°37′38″N 80°11′42″E	Mukundanayanar Temple More images
N-TN-C67	Rock Cut Sculpture, Representing The Group Of Elephants, Monkey And Peacock	Mamallapuram		Chengalpattu	12°37′11″N 80°11′34″E	Rock Cut Sculpture, Representing The Group Of Elephants, Monkey And Peacock More images
N-TN-C68	Rock Cut Ganesha Temple	Mamallapuram		Chengalpattu	12°37′06″N 80°11′33″E	Rock Cut Ganesha Temple More images
N-TN-C69	Rock Cut Varaha Temple Containing Varaha And Vamana Incarnation Of Vishnu	Mamallapuram		Chengalpattu	12°37′05″N 80°11′32″E	Rock Cut Varaha Temple Containing Varaha And Vamana Incarnation Of Vishnu More images
N-TN-C70	Rayagopuram(Unfinished)	Mamallapuram		Chengalpattu	12°37′03″N 80°11′32″E	Rayagopuram(Unfinished) More images
N-TN-C71	Nakula Sahadeva Ratha	Mamallapuram		Chengalpattu	12°36′32″N 80°11′23″E	Nakula Sahadeva Ratha More images
N-TN-C72	Small Monbolithic Temple Known As Valayankuttai Ratha	Mamallapuram		Chengalpattu	12°37′08″N 80°11′15″E	Small Monbolithic Temple Known As Valayankuttai Ratha More images
N-TN-C73	Stone Sculpture Representing The Group Of Monkeys	Mamallapuram		Chengalpattu	12°37′05″N 80°11′34″E	Stone Sculpture Representing The Group Of Monkeys More images
N-TN-C74	Triple-celled rock-cut shrine Trimurti temple with Gopi’s Churn in front of it	Mamallapuram		Chengalpattu	12°37′11″N 80°11′34″E	Triple-celled rock-cut shrine Trimurti temple with Gopi’s Churn in front of it More images
N-TN-C75	Two Rock Cut Temples At North East Corner Of The Koneri Pallam Tank	Mamallapuram		Chengalpattu	12°37′08″N 80°11′28″E	Upload Photo
N-TN-C76	Two Small-Carved Rocks To The South Of The Shore Temple.	Mamallapuram		Chengalpattu	12°36′52″N 80°11′53″E	Upload Photo
N-TN-C77	Two Small Monolithic Temples Known As Pidari Amman Ratha	Mamallapuram		Chengalpattu	12°37′13″N 80°11′15″E	Two Small Monolithic Temples Known As Pidari Amman Ratha More images
N-TN-C78	Two Unfinished Excavations Near The Light House	Mamallapuram		Chengalpattu		Upload Photo
N-TN-C79	Unfinished Excavation close to the Triple Celled Rock-cut Shrine with Gopi’s churn in front of it.	Mamallapuram		Chengalpattu		Upload Photo
N-TN-C80	Unfinished Excavations South Of Draupadi Rath	Mamallapuram		Chengalpattu		Upload Photo
N-TN-C81	Unfinished Ratha And Stone Couch	Mamallapuram		Chengalpattu	12°36′54″N 80°11′30″E	Unfinished Ratha And Stone Couch More images
N-TN-C82	Unfinished Rock Cut Cave Temple North Of Krishna Mandapa Panchapandava Mandapa	Mamallapuram		Chengalpattu	12°37′04″N 80°11′33″E	Unfinished Rock Cut Cave Temple North Of Krishna Mandapa Panchapandava Mandapa More images
N-TN-C83	Megalithic cists and cairns	Mampattu		Chengalpattu		Upload Photo
N-TN-C84	Megalithic cists and cairns	Manamai		Chengalpattu		Upload Photo
N-TN-C85	Megalithic cists and cairns	Melkottaiyur		Chengalpattu		Upload Photo
N-TN-C86	Megalithic cists and cairns	Musaivakkam		Chengalpattu		Upload Photo
N-TN-C87	Megalithic cists and cairns with stone circles	Naduvakkarai		Chengalpattu		Upload Photo
N-TN-C88	Megalithic cists and cairns	Nallikuppam		Chengalpattu		Upload Photo
N-TN-C89	Megalithic cists and cairns with stone circles	Nandivaram		Chengalpattu		Upload Photo
N-TN-C90	Group of cairns (Within the Reserved Forest)	Nanmangalam		Chengalpattu		Upload Photo
N-TN-C91	Megalithic cists and cairns	Nattam		Chengalpattu		Upload Photo
N-TN-C92	Megalithic cists and cairns	Nedungunram		Chengalpattu		Upload Photo
N-TN-C93	Megalithic cists and cairns with stone circles	Olalur		Chengalpattu		Upload Photo
N-TN-C94	Megalithic cists and cairns	Ottivakkam		Chengalpattu		Upload Photo
N-TN-C95	Munkudmisvara Temple	PV Kalathur		Chengalpattu	12°37′03″N 79°58′50″E	Munkudmisvara Temple More images
N-TN-C96	Megalithic cists and cairns	Padur		Chengalpattu		Upload Photo
N-TN-C97	Megalithic cairns and cists in showing clear structural Postures.	Pallavaram		Chengalpattu		Upload Photo
N-TN-C98	Megalithic cists and cairns with stone circles.	Palliyagaram		Chengalpattu		Upload Photo
N-TN-C99	Megalithic cists and cairns	Paranur		Chengalpattu		Upload Photo
N-TN-C100	Megalithic cists and cairns	Perumbakkam		Chengalpattu		Upload Photo
N-TN-C101	Megalithic cists with stone circles circumscribing. (Survey No.367, 454 and 365-A) (367&454 - 206.77 acres Of this, 57.94 acres is private property with several buildings constructed and under construction)(GST Road and Railway lines from Chennai to southern districts pass through the site. Large number of houses are there.Please see The Hindu Business Online 24.11.2005)	Perungalathur		Chengalpattu		Upload Photo
N-TN-C102	Megalithic cists and cairns with stone circles	Ponmar		Chengalpattu		Upload Photo
N-TN-C103	Megalithic cists and cairns	Porundavakkam		Chengalpattu		Upload Photo
N-TN-C104	Megalithic cists and cairns	Pudupakkam		Chengalpattu		Upload Photo
N-TN-C105	Megalithic Cists and Cairns Bounded With Stone Circles	Pulippakkam		Chengalpattu		Upload Photo
N-TN-C106	Megalithic Cists and Cairns	Pundi		Chengalpattu		Upload Photo
N-TN-C107	Megalithic Cists Circumscribed by Stone Circles	Rajakulipettai		Chengalpattu		Upload Photo
N-TN-C108	Megalithic Cists and Cairns with Stone Circles	Rayalpattu		Chengalpattu		Upload Photo
N-TN-C109	Ruined Dutch Fort And Cemetery	Sadras		Chengalpattu	12°31′33″N 80°09′49″E	Ruined Dutch Fort And Cemetery More images
N-TN-C110	Rock Cut Shiva Temple With Three Lingas	Salavankuppam		Chengalpattu	12°39′28″N 80°12′34″E	Rock Cut Shiva Temple With Three Lingas More images
N-TN-C111	Tiger-Headed Rock Cut Temple	Salvankuppam		Chengalpattu	12°39′21″N 80°12′33″E	Tiger-Headed Rock Cut Temple More images
N-TN-C112	Two inscribed rocks, one having six and the other fifty lines of ancient Tamil inscriptions with remains of other ancient buildings around them	Salavankuppam		Chengalpattu	12°39′33″N 80°12′38″E	Upload Photo
N-TN-C113	Megalithic Cists and Cairns	Sanur		Chengalpattu	12°33′56″N 79°54′46″E	Upload Photo
N-TN-C114	Megalithic Cists and Cairns in Virgin State.	Sastirampakkam		Chengalpattu		Upload Photo
N-TN-C115	Group of Cairns and Cists (Within the Reserved Forest)	Sembakkam		Chengalpattu		Upload Photo
N-TN-C116	Megalithic Cists and Cairns (Withine the Reserved Forest)	Sembakkam		Chengalpattu		Upload Photo
N-TN-C117	Megalithic Cists and Cairns	Sengunram		Chengalpattu		Upload Photo
N-TN-C118	Megalithic Cists and Cairns intact with Stone Circles.	Settipuniyam		Chengalpattu		Upload Photo
N-TN-C119	Megalithic Cists and Cairns	Sirudavur		Chengalpattu		Upload Photo
N-TN-C120	Megalithic Cists and Cairns	Sirukunram		Chengalpattu		Upload Photo
N-TN-C121	Megalithic Cists and Cairns	Sittalapakkam		Chengalpattu		Upload Photo
N-TN-C122	Urn Burial and Megalithic Site	St. Thomas Mount		Chengalpattu		Upload Photo
N-TN-C123	Megalithic Cists and Cairns	Tandalam		Chengalpattu		Upload Photo
N-TN-C124	Orukkal Mandapam	Tirukallikunram		Chengalpattu	12°36′35″N 80°03′34″E	Orukkal Mandapam More images
N-TN-C125	Group Of Cairns	Tiruneermalai		Chengalpattu		Upload Photo
N-TN-C126	Megalithic Cist	Tiruneermalai		Chengalpattu		Upload Photo
N-TN-C127	Vast area of megalithic cists and cairns covering the entire hill with the temple of Kailasanatha.	Tirupporur		Chengalpattu	12°43′36″N 80°11′09″E	Upload Photo
N-TN-C128	Sarcophagi and urns spread over a wide area;traces of Megalithic cists and circles.	Tirusulam		Chengalpattu		Upload Photo
N-TN-C129	Nityakalyanasvami Temple	Tiruvidanthai		Chengalpattu	12°45′48″N 80°14′32″E	Nityakalyanasvami Temple More images
N-TN-C130	Megalithic Grave Yard	Tiryvadisulam		Chengalpattu		Upload Photo
N-TN-C131	Megalithic Cists and Cairns	Unamanjeri		Chengalpattu		Upload Photo
N-TN-C132	Megalithic Cists and Cairns	Vaiyavur		Chengalpattu	12°35′51″N 79°53′45″E	Upload Photo
N-TN-C133	Megalithic Cists	Vandalur		Chengalpattu		Upload Photo
N-TN-C134	Tirupulisvara Temple	Vayalur		Chengalpattu	12°29′19″N 80°07′49″E	Upload Photo
N-TN-C135	Megalithic Cists and Cairns With Stone Circles	Vedanarayana; Puram		Chengalpattu		Upload Photo
N-TN-C136	Megalithic Cists and Cairns	Vembedu		Chengalpattu		Upload Photo
N-TN-C137	Megalithic Cists and Cairns	Vengur		Chengalpattu		Upload Photo
N-TN-C138	Megalithic Cists and Cairns With Stone Circles	Venkitapuram		Chengalpattu		Upload Photo
N-TN-C139	Megalithic cists and cairns with stone circles	Venpakkam; Village No.69		Chengalpattu		Upload Photo
N-TN-C140	Megalithic cists and cairns with stone circles	Venpakkam; Village No.273		Chengalpattu		Upload Photo
N-TN-C141	Megalithic Cists and Cairns	Virapuram		Chengalpattu		Upload Photo
N-TN-C142	Iravatanesvara Temple (Mrithyunjeswarar Temple)	Big Kanchipuram		Kanchipuram	12°50′43″N 79°42′18″E	Iravatanesvara Temple (Mrithyunjeswarar Temple) More images
N-TN-C143	Jvarahareswara Swamy Temple	Big Kanchipuram		Kanchipuram	12°50′32″N 79°41′55″E	Jvarahareswara Swamy Temple More images
N-TN-C144	Megalithic Cists and Cairns with bounding stone-circles	Echchur		Kanchipuram		Upload Photo
N-TN-C145	Megalithic Cairns and Cists	Eluchur		Kanchipuram		Upload Photo
N-TN-C146	Megalithic Cairns and Cists	Erumaiyur		Kanchipuram		Upload Photo
N-TN-C147	Megalithic cists and cairns with stone circles	Guduperum; Bedu		Kanchipuram		Upload Photo
N-TN-C148	Piravatanesvara Temple together with the whole of the land in town survey No. M 128I Ward No. IV, Block No. 17	Kanchipuram		Kanchipuram	12°50′43″N 79°42′22″E	Piravatanesvara Temple together with the whole of the land in town survey No. M 128I Ward No. IV, Block No. 17 More images
N-TN-C149	Sri Mathangeswarar Swamiar Temple	Kanchipuram		Kanchipuram	12°50′08″N 79°42′30″E	Sri Mathangeswarar Swamiar Temple More images
N-TN-C150	Sri Muktesvara Swami Temple	Kanchipuram		Kanchipuram	12°50′20″N 79°42′28″E	Sri Muktesvara Swami Temple More images
N-TN-C151	Vaikuntaperumal koil temple	Kanchipuram		Kanchipuram	12°50′14″N 79°42′36″E	Vaikuntaperumal koil temple More images
N-TN-C152	Megalithic cairns and cists	Karanaithangal; Porinjam; Bakkam		Kanchipuram		Upload Photo
N-TN-C153	Megalithic cists and cairns with stone circles on the hill.	Kunnattur		Kanchipuram		Upload Photo
N-TN-C154	Large Siva Temple (Aabathsahayeswarar Temple)	Tenneri		Kanchipuram	12°51′09″N 79°51′12″E	Upload Photo
N-TN-C155	Megalithic cists and cairns	Maganiyam		Kanchipuram		Upload Photo
N-TN-C156	Megalithic Cists and Cairns with bounding stone-circles.	Malaipattu		Kanchipuram		Upload Photo
N-TN-C157	The Old Temple with apsidal Gopuram. (Dharmeswarar Temple)	Manimagalam		Kanchipuram	12°54′56″N 80°02′36″E	The Old Temple with apsidal Gopuram. (Dharmeswarar Temple) More images
N-TN-C158	Megalithic cists and cairns	Nandambakkam		Kanchipuram		Upload Photo
N-TN-C159	Megalithic cists and cairns	Ottiyambakkam		Kanchipuram		Upload Photo
N-TN-C160	Megalithic cists and cairns	Palayasivaram		Kanchipuram		Upload Photo
N-TN-C161	Megalithic cists and cairns	Perunagar		Kanchipuram		Upload Photo
N-TN-C162	Kailasanatha Temple	Salabogam		Kanchipuram	12°50′32″N 79°41′23″E	Kailasanatha Temple More images
N-TN-C163	Megalithic Cists and Cairns	Settupattu		Kanchipuram		Upload Photo
N-TN-C164	Megalithic Cairns With Stone Circles and Sarvophagi	Sikkarayapuram		Kanchipuram	13°00′50″N 80°06′09″E	Upload Photo
N-TN-C165	Megalithic Cists and Cairns	Sirukalattur		Kanchipuram		Upload Photo
N-TN-C166	Megalithic Cists and Cairns	Tattanur		Kanchipuram		Upload Photo
N-TN-C167	Lesser Siva Temple (Kanthalingeswara Temple)	Tenneri (Madavilaam)		Kanchipuram	12°50′59″N 79°51′31″E	Upload Photo
N-TN-C168	Venkatesaperumal Temple	Tirumukkudal		Kanchipuram	12°45′46″N 79°51′38″E	Upload Photo
N-TN-C169	Vaikunta Perumal temple together with adjacent land	Uttiramerur		Kanchipuram	12°36′55″N 79°45′30″E	Vaikunta Perumal temple together with adjacent land More images
N-TN-C170	A Dolmen Intact	Uttiramerur		Kanchipuram	12°37′17″N 79°44′59″E	Upload Photo
N-TN-C171	Megalithic Cists and Cairns	Vadakkuppattu		Kanchipuram		Upload Photo
N-TN-C172	Megalithic Cists and Cairns	Vadamangalam		Kanchipuram		Upload Photo
N-TN-C173	Megalithic Cists and Cairns	Venpakkam; Village No.186		Kanchipuram		Upload Photo
N-TN-C174	Megalithic Cists and Cairns	Virapuram		Kanchipuram		Upload Photo
N-TN-C175	Hill Fort	Krishnagiri		Krishnagiri	12°32′19″N 78°12′49″E	Hill Fort More images
N-TN-C176	Hill Fort	Rayakkottai		Krishnagiri	12°31′17″N 78°02′13″E	Hill Fort More images
N-TN-C177	Hill Fort	Namakkal		Namakkal	11°13′20″N 78°09′55″E	Hill Fort More images
N-TN-C178	The Temples of Sri Ranganatha Swamy And Sri Narasimha Swamy Temple on either side of the hill.	Namakkal		Namakkal	11°13′21″N 78°09′53″E	The Temples of Sri Ranganatha Swamy And Sri Narasimha Swamy Temple on either side of the hill. More images
N-TN-C179	Megalithic Cists and Cairns	Karai		Perambalur		Upload Photo
N-TN-C180	Ranjankudi Fort	Ranjankudi		Perambalur	11°20′47″N 78°56′21″E	Ranjankudi Fort More images
N-TN-C181	Siva Temple (Vaaleeswarar Temple)	Valikantapuram		Perumbalur	11°18′55″N 78°54′56″E	Upload Photo
N-TN-C182	Shamshkhan’s Mosque	Vallapuram		Perambalur	11°19′07″N 78°54′49″E	Upload Photo
N-TN-C183	Remains Of Fort With Building Thereon: Fort of Attur	Attur		Salem	11°36′09″N 78°35′55″E	Remains Of Fort With Building Thereon: Fort of Attur More images
N-TN-C184	Fort And Temple (Varadaraja Perumal Temple) On The Hill	Chinna Kavandanur		Salem	11°28′46″N 77°51′53″E	Fort And Temple (Varadaraja Perumal Temple) On The Hill More images
N-TN-C185	Urn burials	Amirtha; Mangalam		Tiruvallur		Upload Photo
N-TN-C186	A Virigin Ground Containing many Burrows.	Attanthangal		Tiruvallur		Upload Photo
N-TN-C187	Megalithic Cists	Chedalpakkam		Tiruvallur		Upload Photo
N-TN-C188	Megalithic cairns and Barrows	Neyveli		Tiruvallur		Upload Photo
N-TN-C189	Urn Burials	Palavakkam		Tiruvallur		Upload Photo
N-TN-C190	Megalithic Cists and Cairns	Pammadukulam		Tiruvallur		Upload Photo
N-TN-C191	Megalithic cists and cairns with bounding stone circles	Panchali		Tiruvallur		Upload Photo
N-TN-C192	Megalithic Cists and Cairns	Pondavakkam		Tiruvallur		Upload Photo
N-TN-C193	Megalithic Cists and Cairns	Pottur		Tiruvallur		Upload Photo
N-TN-C194	The Prehistoric settlement site coeval with the Megalithic period.	Pulal		Tiruvallur		Upload Photo
N-TN-C195	Dutch Cemetery	Pulicat		Tiruvallur	13°25′08″N 80°18′55″E	Dutch Cemetery More images
N-TN-C196	Cairn Site	Sengarai		Tiruvallur		Upload Photo
N-TN-C197	Megalithic cairns with bounding stone circles	Siruvadu		Tiruvallur		Upload Photo
N-TN-C198	Megalithic cairns with bounding stone circles	Tadipadi		Tiruvallur		Upload Photo
N-TN-C199	Megalithic cairns with bounding stone circles.	Vanmalli		Tiruvallur		Upload Photo
N-TN-C200	Svayambunathar Temple	Kilputhur		Tiruvannamalai	12°26′49″N 79°31′12″E	Upload Photo
N-TN-C201	Rock-Cut Shrine	Kuranganilmuttam		Tiruvannamalai	12°46′03″N 79°41′33″E	Rock-Cut Shrine More images
N-TN-C202	Rock Cut Caves, Sculptures And Inscriptions.	Mamandur		Tiruvannamalai	12°44′30″N 79°39′57″E	Rock Cut Caves, Sculptures And Inscriptions. More images
N-TN-C203	Site containing megalithic burials including the monolithic anthromorphic figure erected at the site.	Mottur		Tiruvannamalai	12°08′18″N 78°50′05″E	Upload Photo
N-TN-C204	Rock Cut Caves	Narasamangalam		Tiruvannamalai	12°44′30″N 79°39′57″E	Rock Cut Caves More images
N-TN-C205	Chandramoulisvarar temple together with adjacent land.	Nattery		Tiruvannamalai	12°49′51″N 79°31′13″E	Upload Photo
N-TN-C206	Megalithic Cists and Cairns	Nedungal		Tiruvannamalai		Upload Photo
N-TN-C207	Rock Cut Temple And Sculptures	Siyamangalam		Tiruvannamalai	12°26′03″N 79°27′56″E	Rock Cut Temple And Sculptures More images
N-TN-C208	Megalithic Cists	Tellur		Tiruvannamalai		Upload Photo
N-TN-C209	Megalithic Cists and Cairns	Tetturai		Tiruvannamalai		Upload Photo
N-TN-C210	Jain Temple	Tirumalai		Tiruvannamalai	12°33′26″N 79°12′22″E	Jain Temple More images
N-TN-C211	Two natural caverns known as Virupakshi Cuha & Skandashram with the passage leading to Skandasramam from Ramanasramam.	Tiruvannamali		Tiruvannamalai	12°14′01″N 79°03′43″E	Two natural caverns known as Virupakshi Cuha & Skandashram with the passage leading to Skandasramam from Ramanasramam. More images
N-TN-C212	Megalithic Cists and Cairns	Venkunnam		Tiruvannamalai		Upload Photo
N-TN-C213	Delhi Gate	Arcot		Ranipet	12°54′27″N 79°20′16″E	Delhi Gate More images
N-TN-C214	Masjid and 2 ponds in the west of the citadel.	Arcot		Ranipet	12°54′03″N 79°20′07″E	Masjid and 2 ponds in the west of the citadel. More images
N-TN-C215	Adjoining Building To The Masjid And Two Ponds.	Arcot		Ranipet	12°54′03″N 79°20′06″E	Upload Photo
N-TN-C216	The Cannon	Arcot		Ranipet	12°54′05″N 79°20′07″E	The Cannon More images
N-TN-C217	Ranganatha Temple (Aranganathar Temple) along with adjoining area comprised in a portion.	Erukkampattu		Vellore	13°05′24″N 79°15′45″E	Ranganatha Temple (Aranganathar Temple) along with adjoining area comprised in a portion. More images
N-TN-C218	Monolithic Rock Cut Temple	Mahendravadi		Ranipet	12°59′22″N 79°32′30″E	Monolithic Rock Cut Temple More images
N-TN-C219	Choleswara Temple	Melpadi		Vellore	13°03′50″N 79°17′04″E	Choleswara Temple More images
N-TN-C220	Somanatha Temple	Melpadi		Vellore	13°03′54″N 79°17′03″E	Somanatha Temple More images
N-TN-C221	North Eastern Corner Of The Outer Rampart Of The Old Fort At Arcot	Muppaduvetti		Ranipet	12°53′36″N 79°20′24″E	Upload Photo
N-TN-C222	Rock Inscription On The Right Flank Of The Sholinghur Tank	Sholinghur		Ranipet	13°05′19″N 79°25′06″E	Rock Inscription On The Right Flank Of The Sholinghur Tank More images
N-TN-C223	Konar Temple	Tirumalpur		Ranipet	12°56′35″N 79°38′59″E	Konar Temple More images
N-TN-C224	Jain Sculpture And Inscription on the hill	Vallimalai		Vellore	13°04′30″N 79°15′45″E	Jain Sculpture And Inscription on the hill More images
N-TN-C225	Subramanya Temple	Vallimalai		Vellore	13°04′26″N 79°15′35″E	Subramanya Temple More images
N-TN-C226	Fort	Vellore		Vellore	12°55′16″N 79°07′50″E	Fort More images
N-TN-C227	Jalkanteswara Temple	Vellore		Vellore	12°55′20″N 79°07′45″E	Jalkanteswara Temple More images
N-TN-C228	Old Mosque In The Fort	Vellore		Vellore	12°55′09″N 79°07′45″E	Upload Photo
N-TN-C229	Rock, Sculptures & Caves	Vilapakkam		Ranipet	12°51′56″N 79°16′47″E	Rock, Sculptures & Caves More images
N-TN-C230	Brahmapurisvara Temple	Brahmadesam		Viluppuram	12°07′09″N 79°28′42″E	Brahmapurisvara Temple More images
N-TN-C231	Sri Pathaleswara Temple	Brahmadesam		Viluppuram	12°07′05″N 79°28′54″E	Sri Pathaleswara Temple More images
N-TN-C232	Rock Cut Pallava Temple	Dalavanur		Viluppuram	12°10′00″N 79°28′07″E	Rock Cut Pallava Temple More images
N-TN-C233	Sri Alagiya Narasimha Perumal Temple	Ennayiram		Viluppuram	12°07′28″N 79°29′32″E	Sri Alagiya Narasimha Perumal Temple More images
N-TN-C234	Fortress comprising hill fort on the Rajagiri, the inner and lower fort, and lines of fortifications connecting the Rajagiri, Krishnagiri and Chakkilidurg (Orme’s St. George’s mountain) hills.	Gingee		Viluppuram	12°14′56″N 79°23′45″E	Fortress comprising hill fort on the Rajagiri, the inner and lower fort, and lines of fortifications connecting the Rajagiri, Krishnagiri and Chakkilidurg (Orme’s St. George’s mountain) hills. More images
N-TN-C235	In the minor and lower forts- (a) (i) Inner fort, Venugopala temple called ‘BajanaiKudam’ with large polished slab and fine carved figures in three panels, a granary, a gymnasium, Kalyana Mahal (ii) Stables and barracks, the remains of Mahabut Khan’s mosque (iii) Anaikulam tank (b) Lower fort, Chakkarikulam and Chettikulam ponds, a dais with two idols representing Kamalakanni Ammal and with two symbols of serpent god, the masonry platform of Desings funeral pyre and his girl-wife’s sati, idol ofHanuman.	Gingee		Viluppuram	12°15′01″N 79°24′01″E	In the minor and lower forts- (a) (i) Inner fort, Venugopala temple called ‘BajanaiKudam’ with large polished slab and fine carved figures in three panels, a granary, a gymnasium, Kalyana Mahal (ii) Stables and barracks, the remains of Mahabut Khan’s mosque (iii) Anaikulam tank (b) Lower fort, Chakkarikulam and Chettikulam ponds, a dais with two idols representing Kamalakanni Ammal and with two symbols of serpent god, the masonry platform of Desings funeral pyre and his girl-wife’s sati, idol ofHanuman. More images
N-TN-C236	Old Jail near the Pondicherry gate and two Persian inscriptions on the outer face of the last two bastions in the south of the eastern wall of the inner fort.	Gingee		Viluppuram	12°14′57″N 79°24′18″E	Upload Photo
N-TN-C237	On the Krishnagiri-Two granaries, well for storing ghee,well for storing oil, two temples and an audience chamber.	Gingee		Viluppuram	12°15′33″N 79°24′21″E	On the Krishnagiri-Two granaries, well for storing ghee,well for storing oil, two temples and an audience chamber. More images
N-TN-C238	On the Rajagiri - Two granaries, a magazine,flagstaff, Ranganatha temple, Kamalakanniamman temple and the sacrificial slab in front of it, a big cannon, a treasury and an audience hall.	Gingee		Viluppuram	12°14′59″N 79°23′45″E	On the Rajagiri - Two granaries, a magazine,flagstaff, Ranganatha temple, Kamalakanniamman temple and the sacrificial slab in front of it, a big cannon, a treasury and an audience hall. More images
N-TN-C239	Saad-at-alla Khan’s mosque with Persian inscriptions, inscriptions in Persian on Pondicherry gate (A.D. 1713).	Gingee		Viluppuram	12°14′59″N 79°24′08″E	Upload Photo
N-TN-C240	Venkararamana Temple With Inscription In Tamil-Prisoner's Well	Gingee		Viluppuram	12°14′49″N 79°24′11″E	Venkararamana Temple With Inscription In Tamil-Prisoner's Well More images
N-TN-C241	Urn Burial Site	Kadagambattu		Viluppuram	12°01′21″N 79°39′22″E	Upload Photo
N-TN-C242	Pallava Rock-Cut Shrine	Kilmavilangai		Viluppuram	12°19′34″N 79°36′22″E	Pallava Rock-Cut Shrine More images
N-TN-C243	Rock-cut Pallava Temple	Mandagapattu		Viluppuram	12°06′28″N 79°27′23″E	Rock-cut Pallava Temple More images
N-TN-C244	Outside The Fort-Pattabhirama Temple And 12 Pillared Mandapa	Narasingarayanan pettai		Viluppuram	12°14′05″N 79°24′13″E	Outside The Fort-Pattabhirama Temple And 12 Pillared Mandapa More images
N-TN-C245	Talagirisvara temple and a cave containing an image of Durga and Pallava inscription together with adjacent land	Panamalai		Viluppuram	12°06′15″N 79°22′43″E	Talagirisvara temple and a cave containing an image of Durga and Pallava inscription together with adjacent land More images
N-TN-C246	Apathsahayeswra Temple and gateway with Horses.	Sendamangalam		kallakurichi	11°44′46″N 79°22′39″E	Apathsahayeswra Temple and gateway with Horses. More images
N-TN-C247	Megalithic Cairns and Stone Circles	Sengamedu		Viluppuram	12°01′16″N 79°40′29″E	Upload Photo
N-TN-C248	24 Jain Figure In Two Rows, A Standing Nude Figure, Two Fragments Of A Sitting Figure And Two Inscritpions On Tirunathankunru.	Sirukadambur		Viluppuram	12°16′23″N 79°24′25″E	Upload Photo
N-TN-C249	Vinnamparai Rock Containing Pallava Inscriptions	Thondur		Viluppuram	12°20′53″N 79°28′27″E	Upload Photo
N-TN-C250	Megalithic Stone Circles	Tiruvakkarai		Viluppuram	12°02′12″N 79°39′03″E	Upload Photo

== See also ==
- List of Monuments of National Importance in Trichy circle
- List of Monuments of National Importance in India for other Monuments of National Importance in India
- List of State Protected Monuments in Tamil Nadu
