= Padikasu =

Padikasu may refer to:

- Padikasu Nathar Temple
- Padikasu Pulavar
