= Mamandur =

Village in Tamil Nadu, India

Coordinates: 12.74°N 79.66°E

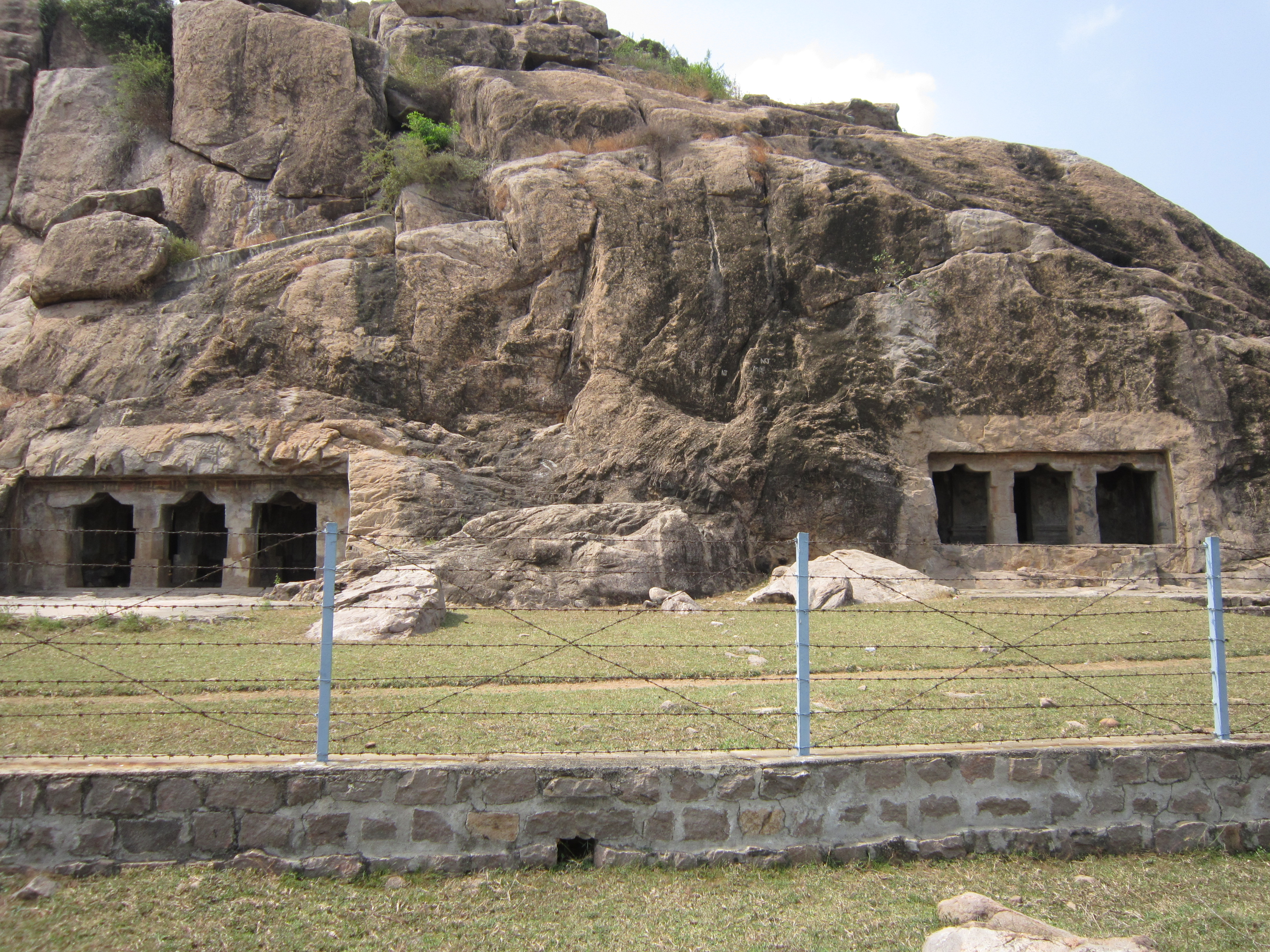
Mamandur rock cut caves

Mamandur is a village in Tiruvanamalai district of Tamil Nadu, India. It is located on the Kanchipuram - Vandavasi road, near Dusi and about 10 km from Kanchipuram. It is known for the 7th-century rock-cut cave temple, housing a Tamil Brahmi inscription, one of the monuments of national importance as declared by the Archaeological Survey of India.

Brahmi is the earliest Indian alphabetical script with regional variations, dated between 300 BCE and 300 CE. Inscriptions in the rock-cut temples, attribute the temples to 7th-century CE Pallava king, Mahendravarman I, a ruler who delighted in the titles of Vichitra chitta ("curious-minded") and Chitrakara puli ("tiger among artists"). He was a great patron of the arts and Mamallapuram (or Mahabalipuram) stands as a testimony to his patronage of art and architecture. He pioneered rock-cut temples in Mamallapuram, Pallavaram (near Madras originally the hill was called Pancha Pandavar malai in pallavaram and the cave temple as called pancha pandavar malai cave temple of pallavaram), Siyamangalam and Singavaram (North Arcot district), Tiruchi and Mamandur (in Kanchipuram district). Narsimha is the principal deity of Cave I, while the Cave II, in the complex, is known from later inscriptions as the Saiva Rudravalisvaram Cave.

The caves are situated on the banks of Palar river. A tank named Chitramegha tataka, also known as Dusi-Mamandur tank is located behind the caves, which believed to be built Mahendravarman I. The cave contain Tamil Brahmi inscriptions and cave paintings.

Cave Temple 1 "is approached by a staircase cut into the hill. The façade is made up of two pillars and two pilasters. Two pillars made up of cubes above and below with an octagonal shaft in the middle make up the façade of this cave. There are lotus medallions on the lower and top cubes. Behind these pillars there is a second row of pillars. A central shrine protrudes from the back wall. The pillars are in typical Mahendravarman style dedicated to Vishnu.

Mamandur cave temples is the template style of Dravida temple architecture

On the northern wall of the mukha-mandapa there is an inscription probably authored by the same king. Lines 12 and 13 suggest that the king ‘wanted to achieve what was not achieved before in the realm of music’.

Cave Temple 2, situated south of the first cave, also has an ardha mandapa and mukha mandapa separated by two pillars behind the first row. There are three sanctum sanctorum in this cave temple, dedicated Brahma, Shiva and Vishnu. Two steps in front, with a low stone rail shaped like the back of an elephant lead into each garba griha.

According to an inscription inside the central sanctum, it is called Uruttiravalisvaram (Rudravalisvaram). Thus Shiva or Rudra would have been the deity of the central sanctum. The dvaarapalas of the central sanctum stand in tribhanga, one hand on the waist and another resting on their heavy clubs which are intertwined with serpents, wearing huge jatabhaaras on their heads, yajnopavita (sacred thread) and ornaments. The Linga in the sanctum indicates that this garba griha was dedicated to Shiva.

The dvaarapalas of the southern sanctum stand in tribhanga, with a hand on the waist and a lotus in the other. Wearing a yajnopavita and jatabhaara on their heads, they were obviously intended to be sages or brahmanas, and the deity within must have been Brahma.

It is dedicated to Vishnu, although there is no figure inside.

Traces of painting are visible inside the sanctum, suggesting that the cave temples were once painted.

There are two inscriptions of Parantaka I Chola inside this cave temple, saying that the caves were called Vruttiravaliswaram and Valiswaram The irrigation tank, Chitramegha tataka, is assumed to have been excavated on the orders of Mahendravarman I Pallava.

Cave Temple 3 – Situated south of the previous cave, this is the largest of the four caves. There are several cracks on the pillars, which may be the reason for not finishing this cave. There are five pillars and two pilasters on the façade, in typical Mahendravarman style. The corbel above the pillars is in curved profile. The southern façade has two pillars and two pilasters. Corbels are finished above the pillars, however these are not fully cut in to make the space for circumambulation. This cave has an ardha-mandapa and mukha-mandapa, the two differentiated by two rows of pillars and pilasters.

The five shrines at the back of the cave share a common platform, with staircases in front of each, consisting of three steps. The cells are all cubical and empty, with no dvarpalas or inscriptions. This shrine would have had seven cells, five on the back and two on the side.

Cave Temple 4 – This is the smallest cave on the hill, unfinished, with a façade of two pillars and two pilasters. The façade suggests a three shrine cave, but the work was stopped due to cracks in the rock and load above the roof.
