= Mukteshvara =

Mukteshvara is an aspect of the Hindu god Shiva. Several Shiva temples in India are known by this name:

- Mukteshvara Temple, Bhubaneswar
- Mukteshvara Temple, Chaudayyadanapura
- Muktesvara Temple, Kanchipuram

== See also ==
- Mukteshwar (disambiguation)
