= Dusi =

Dusi may refer to:

- Dusi, Henan (都司镇), town in Dengzhou, Henan, China
- Dusi, Shandong (都司镇), town in Mudan District, Heze, Shandong, China
- Dusi, Andhra Pradesh, a village in Srikakulam district in the Indian state of Andhra Pradesh
- Dusi, Tamil Nadu, a village in Tiruvanamalai district in the Indian state of Tamil Nadu
- Dusi River, a river in KwaZulu-Natal, South Africa
- The Dusi Canoe Marathon, a canoe race held annually on the Msunduzi and Mgeni Rivers in South Africa

== See also ==
- Dusii, plural of Dusios, a divine being
