= Mukteshwar (disambiguation) =

Mukteshwar is a town in the Nainital district of Uttarakhand, India.

Mukteshwar may also refer to:

- Mukteshwar Assembly constituency, Uttarakhand Legislative Assembly
- Mukteshwar Mahadev Temple, Shiva temple in Punjab, India
- Mukteshwar Devalay, Shiva temple in the Juhu suburb of Mumbai, Maharashtra India

== See also ==
- Mukteshvara (disambiguation)
  - Mukteshvara Temple, Bhubaneswar, Shiva temple in Orissa, India
