= Padikasu Pulavar =

Padikasu Pulavar is a Tamil poet who had lived during the late 17th and early 18th centuries. He was a native of Kalandai in Tondaimandalam. He was famous for authoring Thondaimandala Sadhakam, a poetic collection written in praise of Tondaimandalam region or agriculturists. He had also authored Thandalaiyar Sadhakam. He was a court poet of Raghunatha Kilavan, first Sethupathi of Ramnad. The poet was a contemporary of Kalamega Pulavar. Ramalinga Swamigal had written a fine commentary on the invocatory song of the book, Thondamandala Sathagam, which contains one hundred songs, sung by the great poet Padikasu Pulavar.
