= Sri Ranganatha Perumal Temple, Namakkal =

Hindu temple in Tamil Nadu, India

Ranganatha Perumal Temple
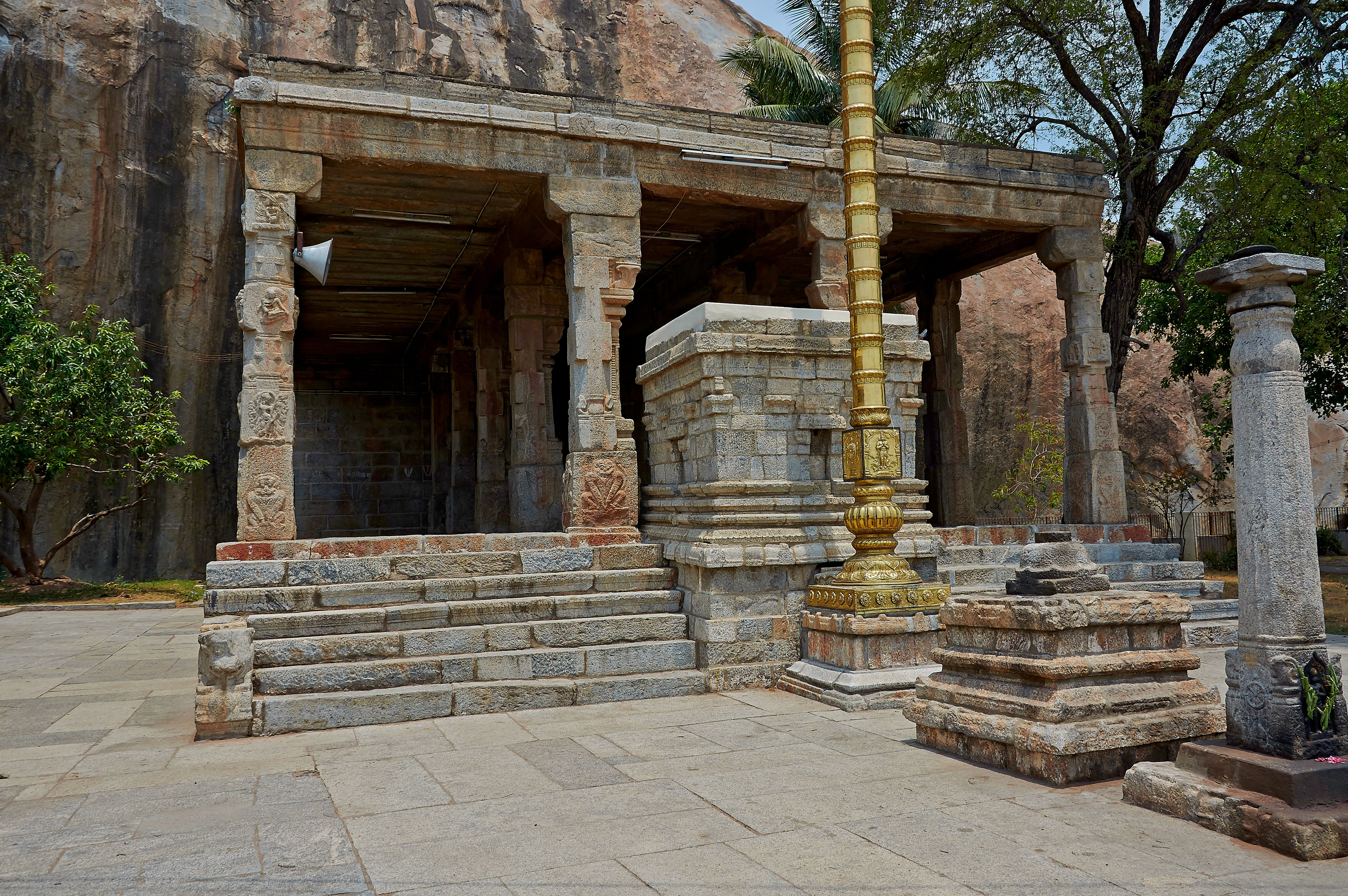

- Location in Tamil Nadu

Religion
- Affiliation: Hinduism
- District: Namakkal
- Deity: Ranganathaswamy (Vishnu) (Lakshmi)

Location
- Location: Namakkal
- State: Tamil Nadu
- Country: India
- Coordinates: 11°13′20″N 78°09′51″E

Architecture
- Type: Dravidian, rock-cut architecture

The Ranganathaswami temple in Namakkal, a town in Namakkal district in the South Indian state of Tamil Nadu, is dedicated to the Hindu god Vishnu. The temple is one of the 108 Purana Kshethrams of Vaishnavate tradition. The temple is constructed in the Dravidian style of architecture and rock-cut architecture, the temple is located in the Salem–Namakkal–Trichy Road. Based on the architectural features, historians believe that the temple was built during the 6th century by the Adiyamans also called Satyaputras as evident from the inscription mentioning the temple as 'Adiyendra Vishnu Gruham' or 'The house of Vishnu of the Adiyaman kings'. This temple plays an important role in history as it has four main Sanskrit inscriptions dated around 6th century to 8th century CE, and is also used to date another cave temple (Narasimhaswamy Temple, Namakkal) excavated in the same hill, as that cave temple as no Inscriptions.

== History ==
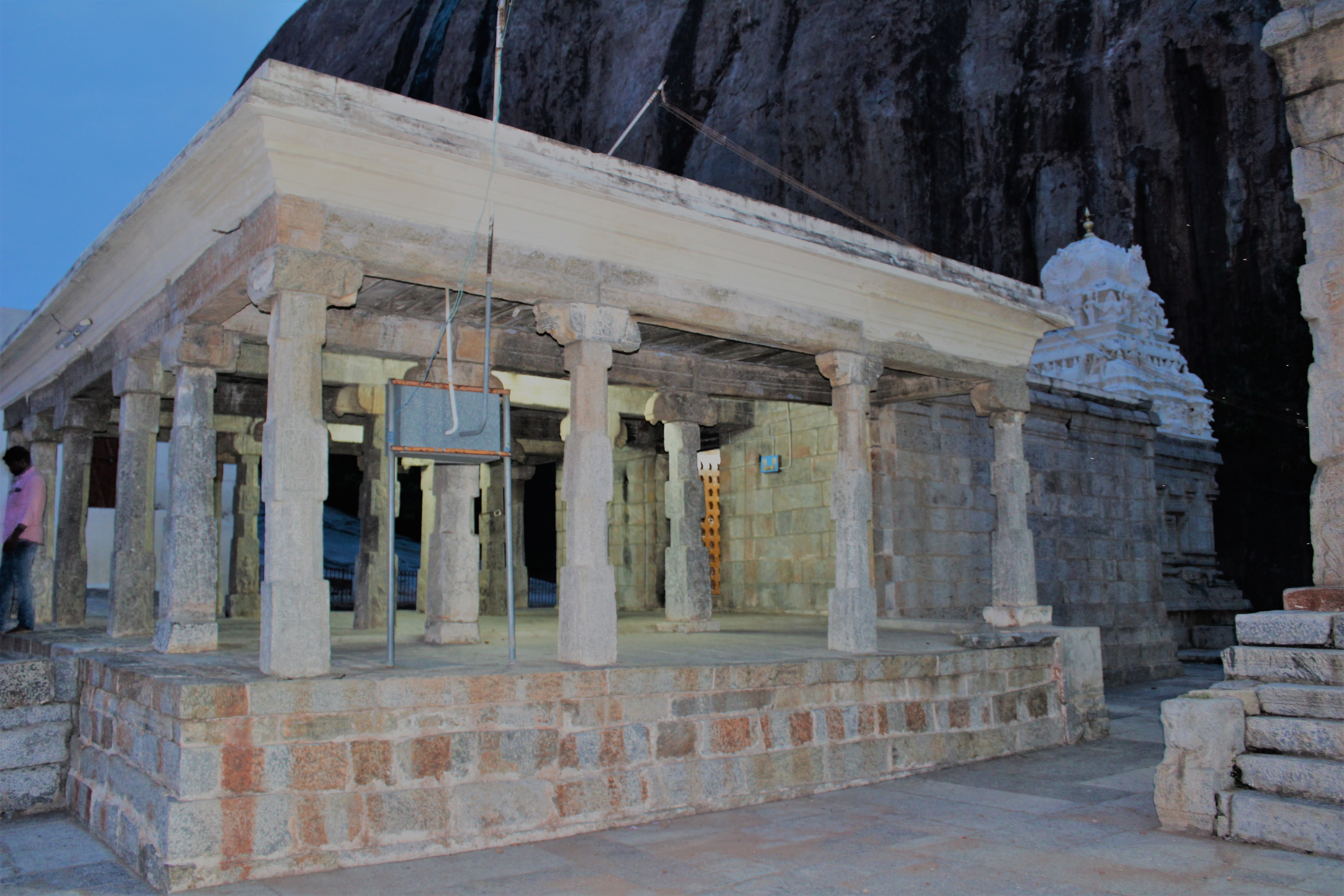
View of the Temple

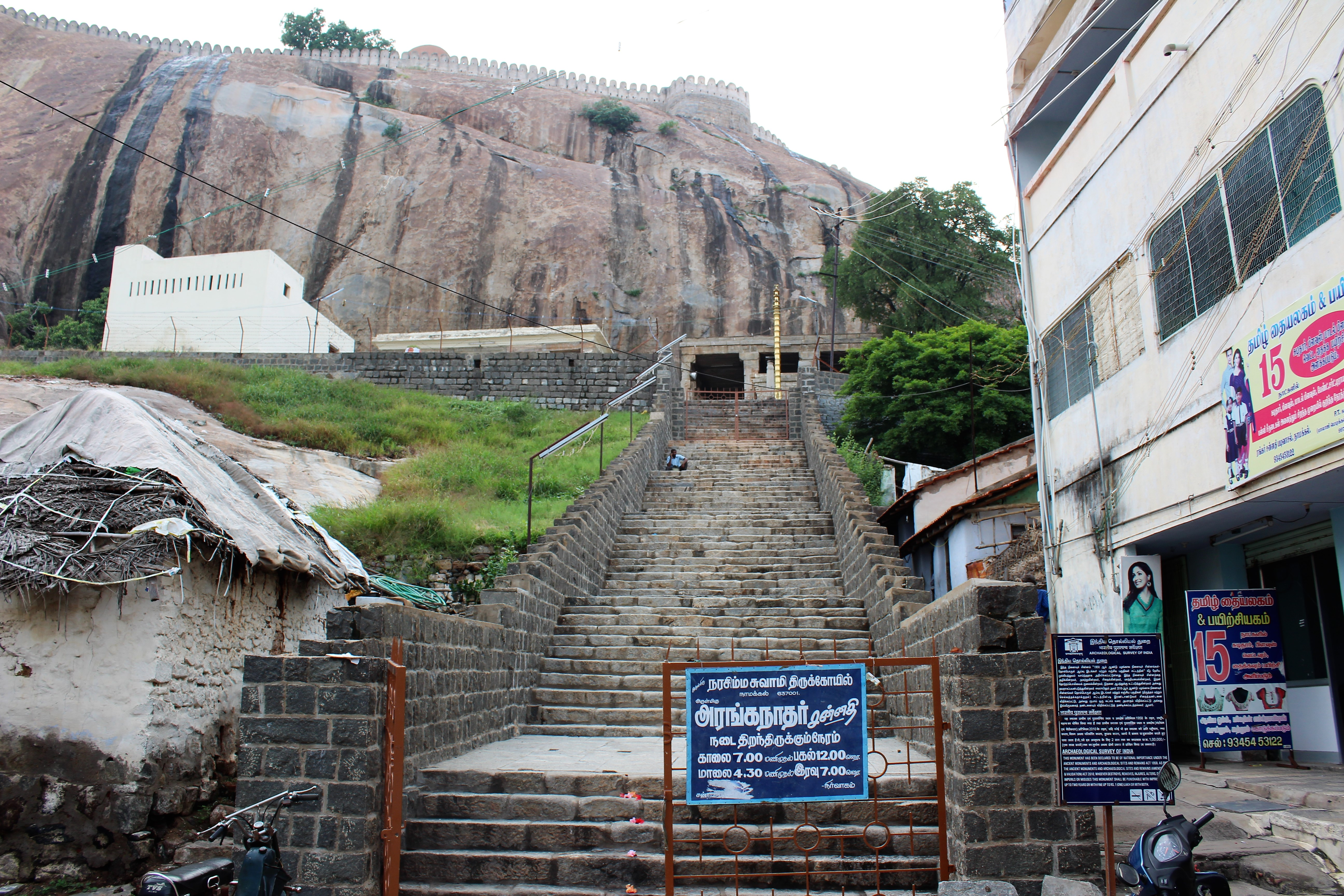
Steps to climb the temple

The temple is considered to be built around the 6th and 7th century CE by the Satyaputra kings in rock-cut architecture. P.R. Srinivasan has placed it at 6th century. Most of the historians have compared the temples with similar architectural elements found in Badami Caves (6th century) and a possible influence. There are few inscriptions in the temple, especially an undated inscription in Grantha Characters of Sanskrit in the temple which are similar to the inscriptions in the Ganesha Ratha in Mahabalipuram. There are totally four main inscriptions in this Ranganatha temple, the first main inscription mentions it as Adiyanatha Vishnu Grham by Gunasila King and Adiyendra Vishnu Gruham which evidently shows that the cave was excavated by the Satyaputra kings, apart from these inscriptions another was discovered, this inscription not only confirms this but also mentions the king's name as Gunasila (Dated 500 CE to 600 CE). Historians believe it is possible that both the temples were built during the same period. The sanctum sanctorum is mentioned as Sayanagrham the main deity is Lord Vishnu sleeping in Anantashayana pose, with all the Gods Worshiping him, The inscriptions details the gods like Shiva, Brahma, Varuna, Narada worshiping Vishnu, there are various rock-cut panels of Sri Vaishnavism in the temple and 12 birudas of King Gunasila inscribed in this Cave. The panels show high architecture which has Thrivikrama, Bala or Kevala Narasimha, Hari Hara. The records of the details of the inscriptions are found in the Annual report of Epigraphy -1961.
