= Chenraya Perumal Temple =

Temple in India

Coordinates: 12.074774°N 78.119289°E

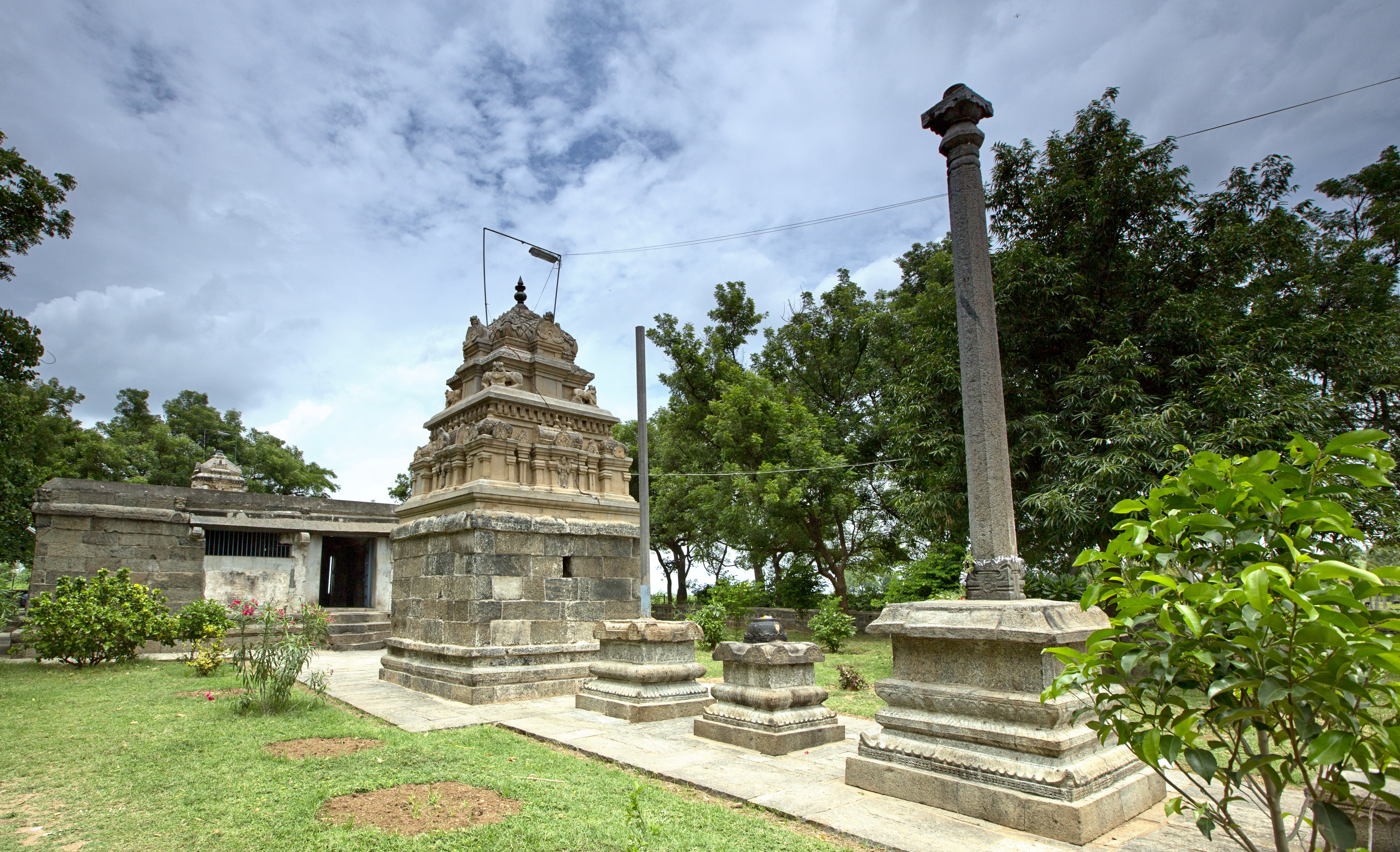
Picture of the temple.

Chenraya Perumal Temple is a Hindu temple located in the town of Adhiyamankottam, 7 km from Dharmapuri on the Salem road. The temple is dedicated to Vishnu and is believed to have been constructed by Hoysala and Vijayanagar kings, the most prominent being Krishnadevaraya. It is a monument of national importance, designated code N-TN-C18 by Archaeological Survey of India. This temple is located in Dharmapuri district.

There is another Chenraya Perumal temple near batlagundu, Dindigul district.

== See also ==
- List of Monuments of National Importance in Chennai circle
