= Arcot, Tamil Nadu =

Town in Ranipet

Arcot Ranipet District
- Town
- Arcot
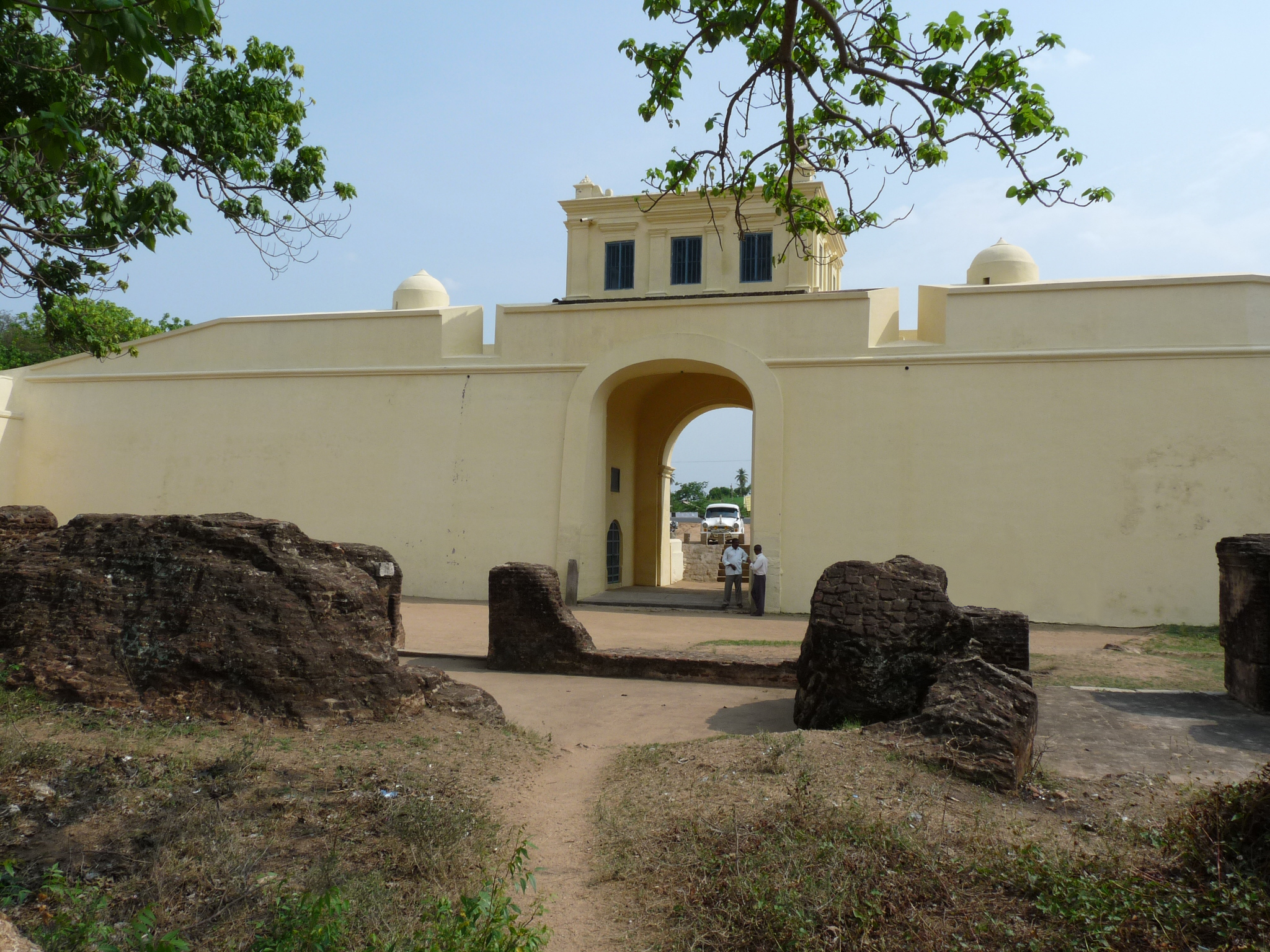
- 18th Century Delhi Gate

- Arcot, Ranipet
- Coordinates: 12.904700°N 79.323800°E
- Country: India
- State: Tamil Nadu
- District: Ranipet district
- Urban Area: Vellore Metropolitan Area
- Taluks: Arcot

Government
  - Type: First Grade Municipality
  - Body: Arcot Municipality
  - Lok Sabha constituency: Arakkonam (Lok Sabha constituency) (DMK)
  - Member of Legislative Assembly: J.L.Eswarappan

Area
  - Total: 13.64 km^{2} (5.27 sq mi)
- Elevation: 194 m (636 ft)

Population (2011)
  - Total: 55,955
  - Density: 4,102/km^{2} (10,620/sq mi)

Languages
  - Official: Tamil
- Time zone: UTC+5:30 (IST)
- PIN: 632503
- Telephone code: 04172
- Vehicle registration: TN 73
- Lok Sabha constituency: Arakkonam
- Civic agency: Arcot Municipality
- Website: www.tnurbantree.tn.gov.in/arcot/

Arcot (Tamil: Ārkāḍu, IPA: [aːrkːaːɖɯ]) is a Town and Taluk of Ranipet district in the Indian state of Tamil Nadu. Located on the southern banks of Palar River, the city straddles a trade route between Chennai and Bangalore and Salem, between the Mysore Ghat and the Javadi Hills (Javvadhu malai).

== Etymology ==
Arcot is the anglicized form of the Tamil word ārkāḍ, which is commonly believed to have been derived from the Tamil words aaru (River) + kaadu (forest). However, arkaadu meant 'a forest of fig trees'.

== Geography ==
Arcot is located at 12.9°N 79.33°E. It has an average elevation of 164 metres (538 ft).

== Government ==
Arcot Municipality was constituted in 1959. It had Third Grade Municipality and was subsequently upgraded to second Grade Municipality in 1973. In July 1998, it was upgraded to I Grade Municipality. The selected council with 30 members and chairpersons have functioned from 25 October 2006.

Arcot Town has a 13.64 km^{2} area with a population of 129,640 as per the census.

Arcot (State Assembly Constituency) is part of Arakkonam (Lok Sabha constituency).

== Demographics ==
Religious census
Religion	Percent(%)
Hindu	84.65%
Muslim	15.89%
Christian	0.77%
Sikh	0.01%
Buddhist	0.0%
Jain	0.51%
Other	0.16%
No religion	0.01%

According to 2011 census, Arcot had a population of 55,955 including Tajpura and Veppur revenue villages under the municipality control with a sex-ratio of 1,014 females for every 1,000 males, much above the national average of 929. A total of 7,174 were under the age of six, constituting 3,249 males and 3,925 females. Scheduled Castes and Scheduled Tribes accounted for 10.31% and .15% of the population respectively 75% of the population in this town belongs to Backward peoples. The average literacy of the town was 79.32%, compared to the national average of 72.99%. The town had a total of 16781 households. There were a total of 20,418 workers, comprising 48 cultivators, 166 main agricultural labourers, 1,273 in house hold industries, 17,782 other workers, 1,149 marginal workers, 12 marginal cultivators, 25 marginal agricultural labourers, 142 marginal workers in household industries and 970 other marginal workers. As per the religious census of 2011, Arcot had 70.5% Hindus, 25% Muslims, 0.77% Christians, 0.01% Sikhs, 0.% Buddhists, 0.51% Jains, 0.16% following other religions and 0.01% following no religion or did not indicate any religious preference.
