= Krishna Mandapam, Mahabalipuram =

Krishna Mandapam
- Krishna Mandapam
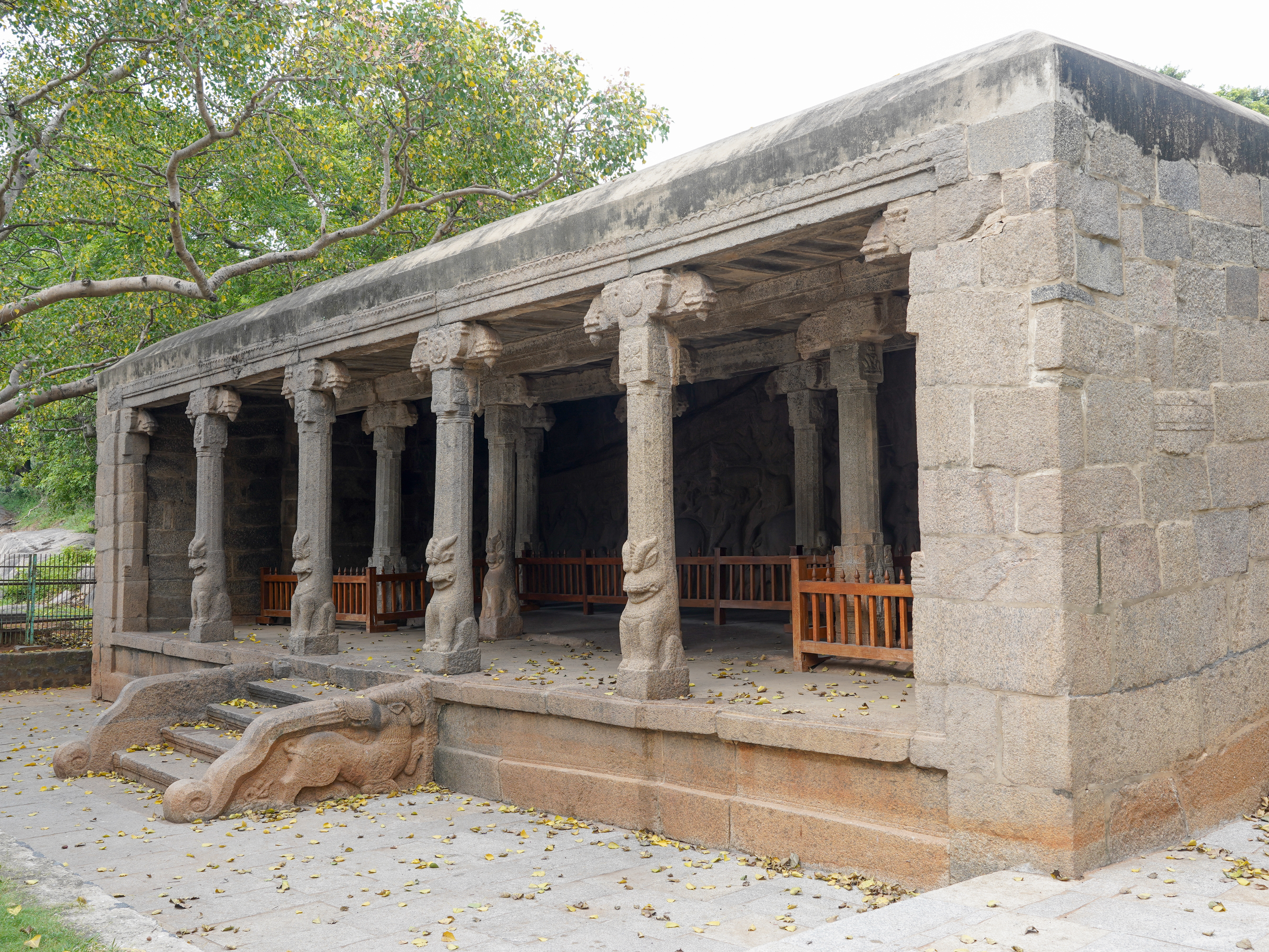
- Entrance to the Krishna Mandapa

- Location of

Religion
- Affiliation: Hinduism
- District: Kancheepuram district
- Deity: Lord Krishna

Location
- Location: Mamallapuram
- State: Tamil Nadu
- Country: India
- Interactive map of Krishna Mandapam
- Coordinates: 12.6167°N 80.1917°E

Architecture
- Creator: Pallava dynasty
- Completed: Mid-7th century
- Temple: 1
- Inscriptions: Inscribed in 1984 under Asia-Pacific of UNESCO

Mandapa of Krishna or Krishna Mandapam is a monument at Mahabalipuram, on the Coromandel Coast of the Bay of Bengal, in the Kancheepuram district of the state of Tamil Nadu, India. It is part of the Group of Monuments at Mahabalipuram, a UNESCO World Heritage Site inscribed in 1984. It is located on a hillock next to the open rock relief of Descent of the Ganges (Mahabalipuram).

It is constituted by an originally open-air bas-relief dedicated to Krishna, dating to the mid-seventh century, which was later enclosed within a mandapa in the 16th century during the Vijayanagara Empire. Notable carvings inside are sculpted panels that bring out the story of Krishna lifting the Govardhana Hill to protect the cowherds and gopis (milk maids) from heavy rains and floods – the "most poetic and endearing" Indian or Angkor sculpture-based representation of this legend – and there are also scenes of Krishna frolicking with the milk maids.

== Layout ==
The building facing east has a length of 29 feet (8.8 m) and height of 12 feet (3.7 m). It is a pillared mandapa.

== Sculpture ==
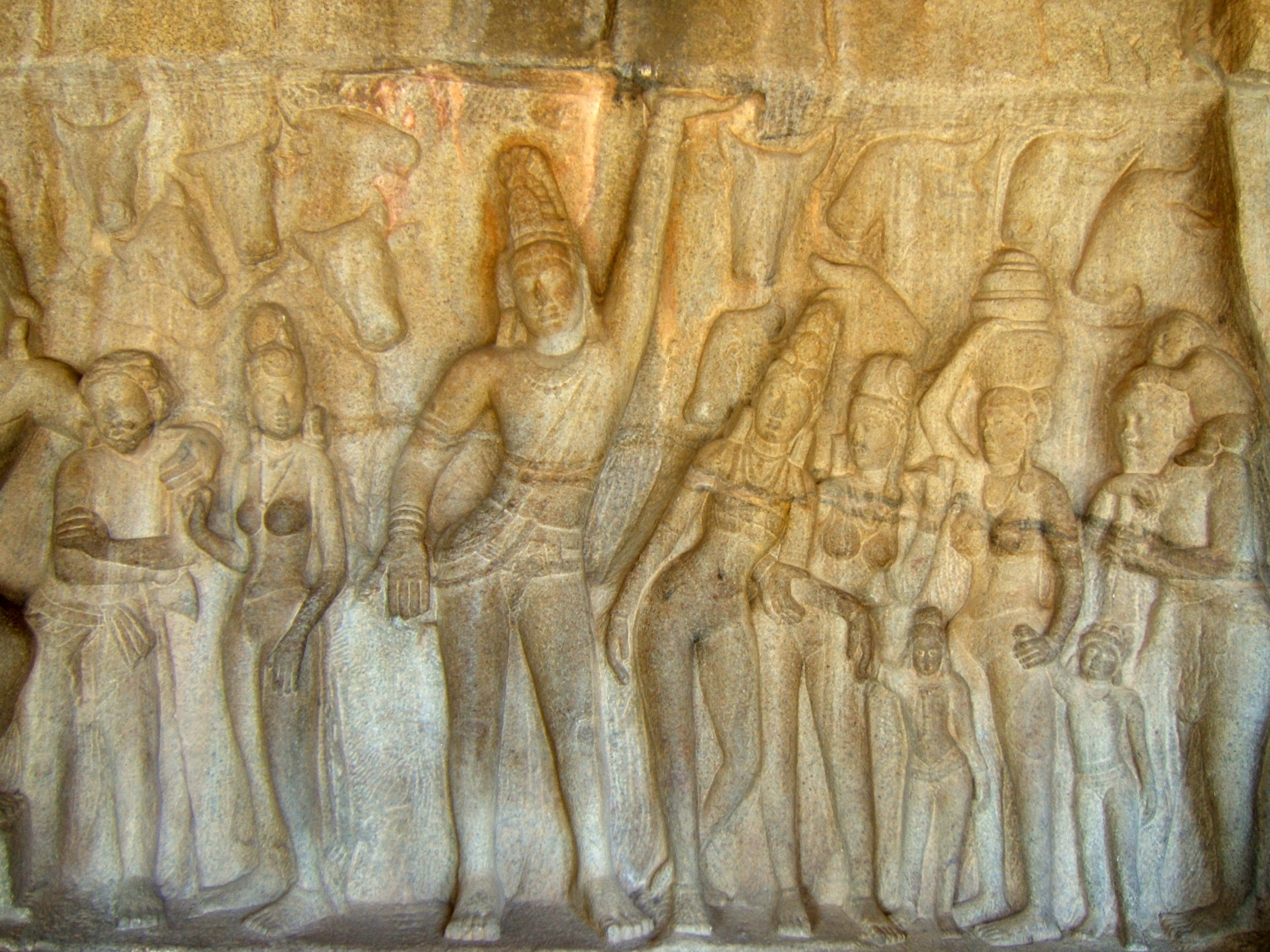
A relief on the rock face of Krishna lifting Govardhan Hill in the Krishna Mandapa

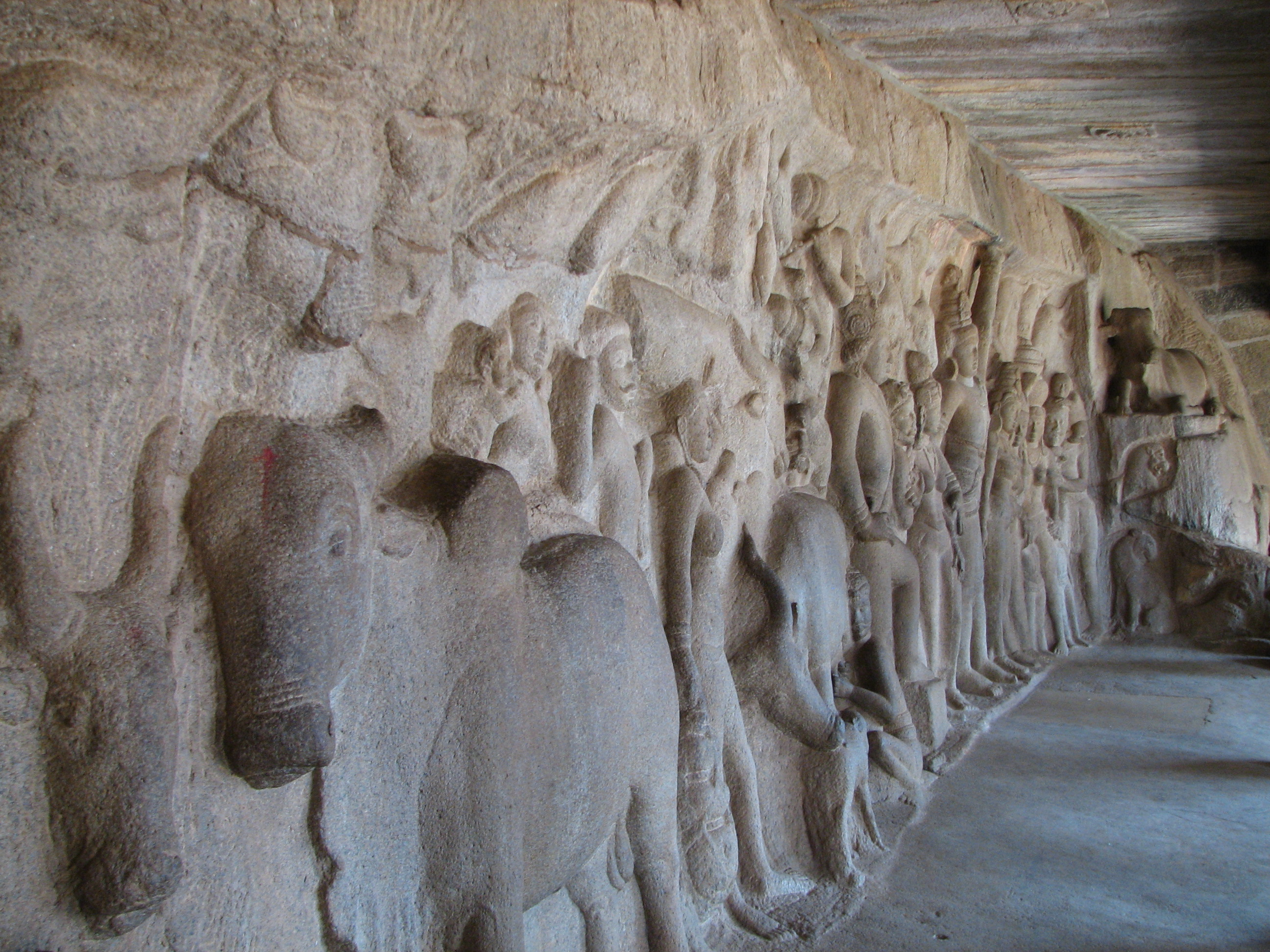
Krishna Mandapa Bas Relief

The structure shelters nine reliefs carved on the rock surfaces, all dated to the 7th century but further refurbished with additions made in the 16th century.

One prominent relief depicts Krishna lifting the Govardhana Hill on the finger of his left hand to save the people from a deluge caused by rains showered by Indra. People with their cattle are shown taking shelter under the mountain. The story related to this depiction is linked to Indra. Indra was annoyed with the people of the village (now Mathura) as they had discontinued celebration of a festival in his honour. He created a huge storm with heavy rainshowers, threatening the life of the villagers. Krishna, who was from the same village, lifted the Govardhana Hill (near Mathura), creating an umbrella of protection and saving the village, its people, and the cowherds. In this relief, Krishna is flanked by three females to his right; one of them is inferred as Radha, his childhood lover, as she is shown wearing a kirita makuta crown, a breast band, and many ornaments. On his right stand two figures, one male and one female. In addition, there are several other images in the panel of animals and village folk.

In another relief, Krishna is shown in a joyous mood with his gopis (milkmaids), a reflection of his double role as a divine being.

Other reliefs carved on the walls of the cave depict: an elderly person carrying a child on his shoulders, a village scene of cowherds milking a cow with the cow licking the calf; the gopis with water pots on their heads amidst a cowherd playing a flute; a woodcutter walking with an axe and a lady carrying a milk pot and a rolled mat or bundle of grass; and a child hugging her mother. Krishna's fresco also shows him playing a flute in the fields. The panel further depicts a standing bull, which is perfectly carved by the Pallava artists. In particular, the carvings in the Krishna cave are reported to be very realistic reinterpretations of themes from the Hindu epics.
