= Delhi Gate, Arcot =

Historical site in Ranipet district, Tamil Nadu, India

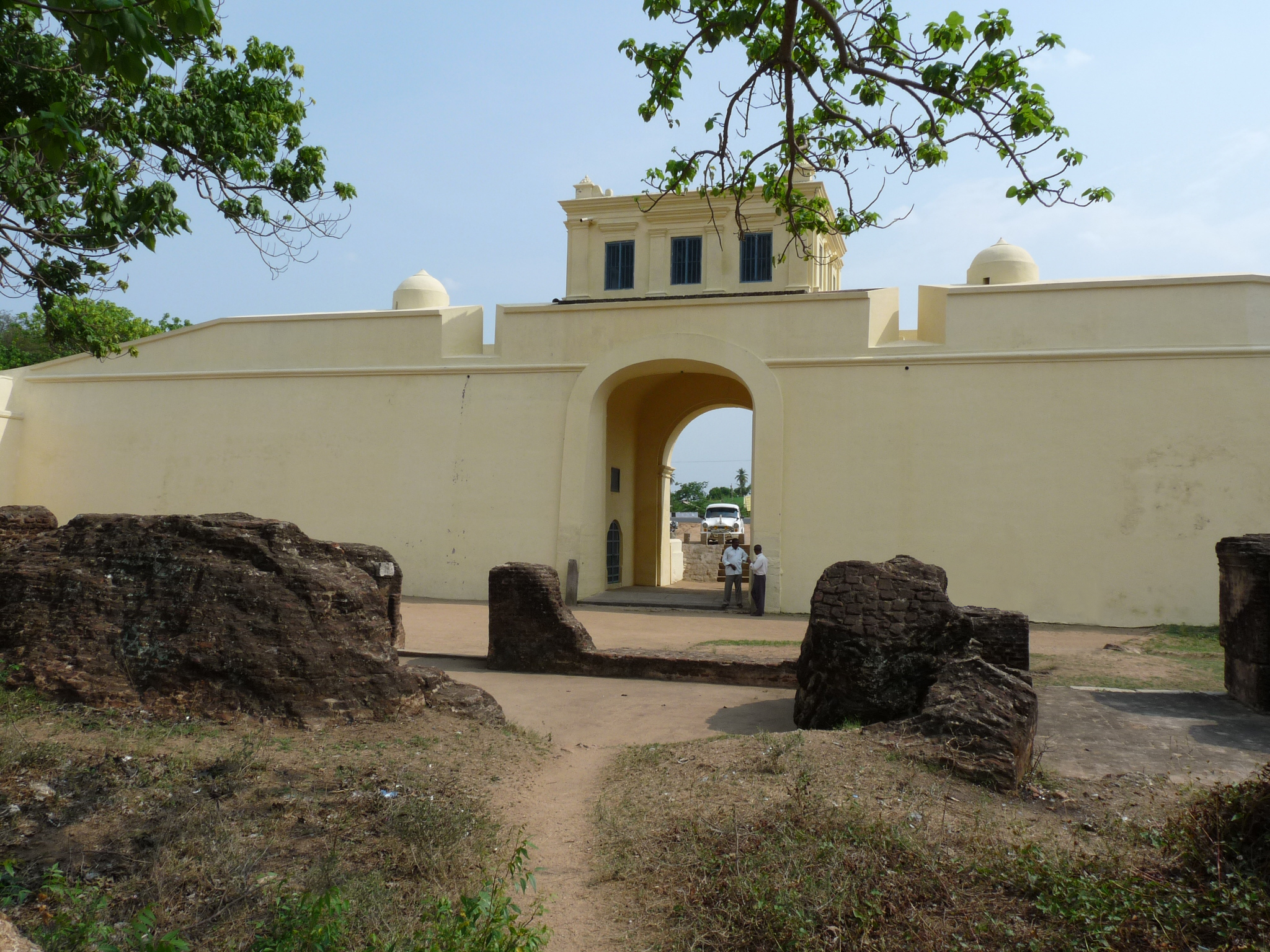
- Delhi Gate, Arcot
- Interactive map of Delhi Gate, Arcot
- 12.9075°N 79.3378°E
- Location: Ranipet, Tamil Nadu

Delhi Gate is part of the fortification of Arcot, a town which is located on the banks of Palar river in Ranipet district, Tamil Nadu, India. The gate was part of a fort built by Mughal governor, Daud Khan Panni, in the first half of the 18th century. It was the site of a memorable defense made by Robert Clive during the Siege of Arcot.

== History ==
Historically, the region had been the site of number of battles. This prompted the construction of the fortress around Arcot.

In the year 1710, Mohammed Sayyid was the last mughal governor who was appointed as Nawab of Karnatic with the title Saadatullah Khan I and moved his capital from Gingee to Arcot.

The prolonged disputes between the different dynasties fighting for the control of Arcot led to the arrival of the British and the French. However the battle between British and French forces was only for control of south India. The capture and the defence of Arcot by handful of British troops and Sepoy under the command of Robert Clive against enormous forces was one of the most remarkable battles fought by the British. The siege lasted fifty days, ending 15 November 1751.

The Arcot Fort was part of the famous Battle of Arcot, which led to a British victory. One of the gates of the fort was renamed "Delhi Gate" to signify the beginning of the capture of Delhi. The entrance of the gate was constructed in the style of a Mughal arch. Over the gate is Robert Clives room.

The old red brick town walls which were part of the original fortification of Arcot were destroyed by Tippu Sultan in 1783, but the foundations can be still seen. Today, the remains of the tombs of Saadatullah Khan I and the jama masjid (congregational mosque) are the silent witnesses to that period.

== Gallery ==
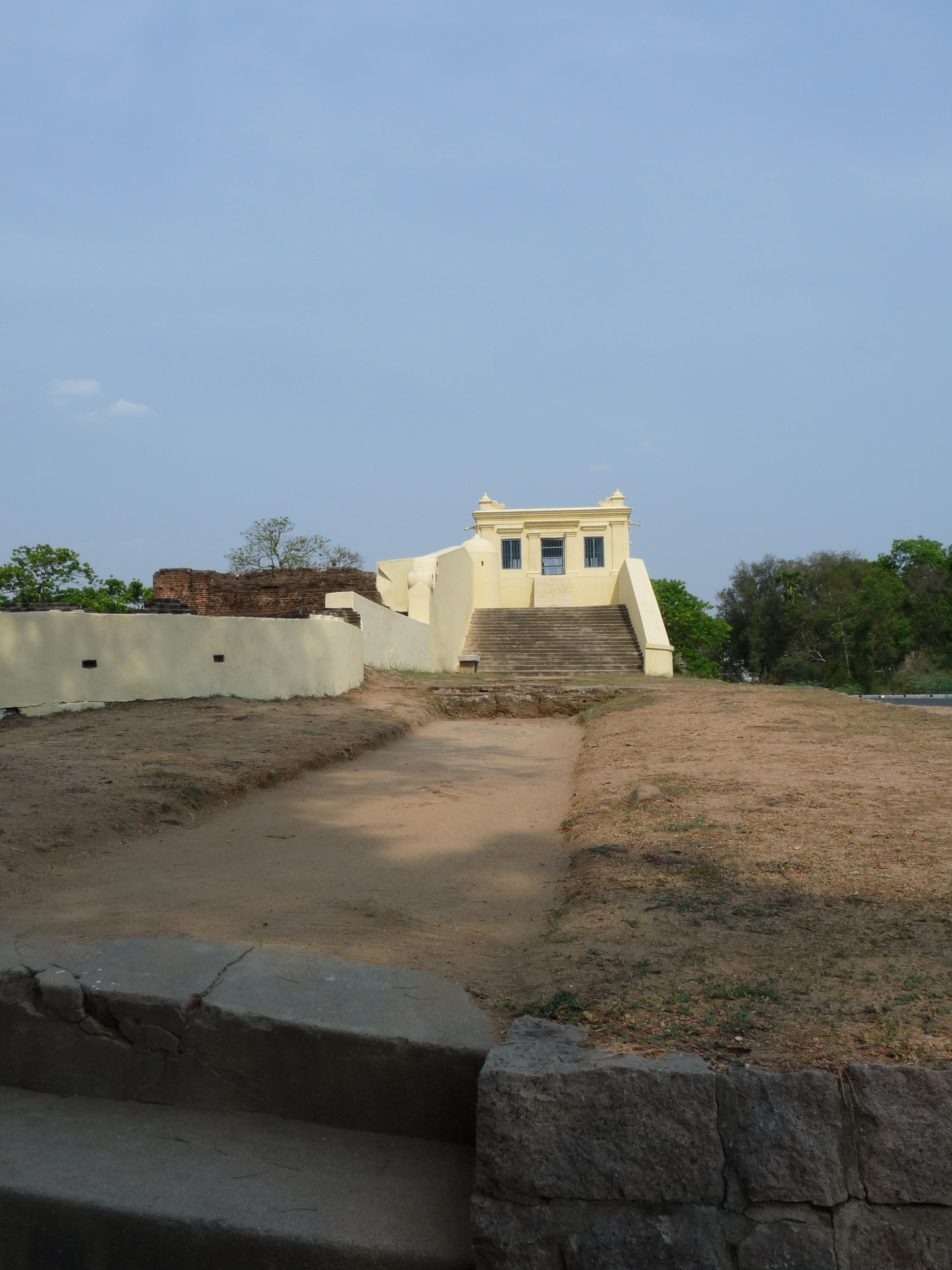
Delhi Gate - Side View

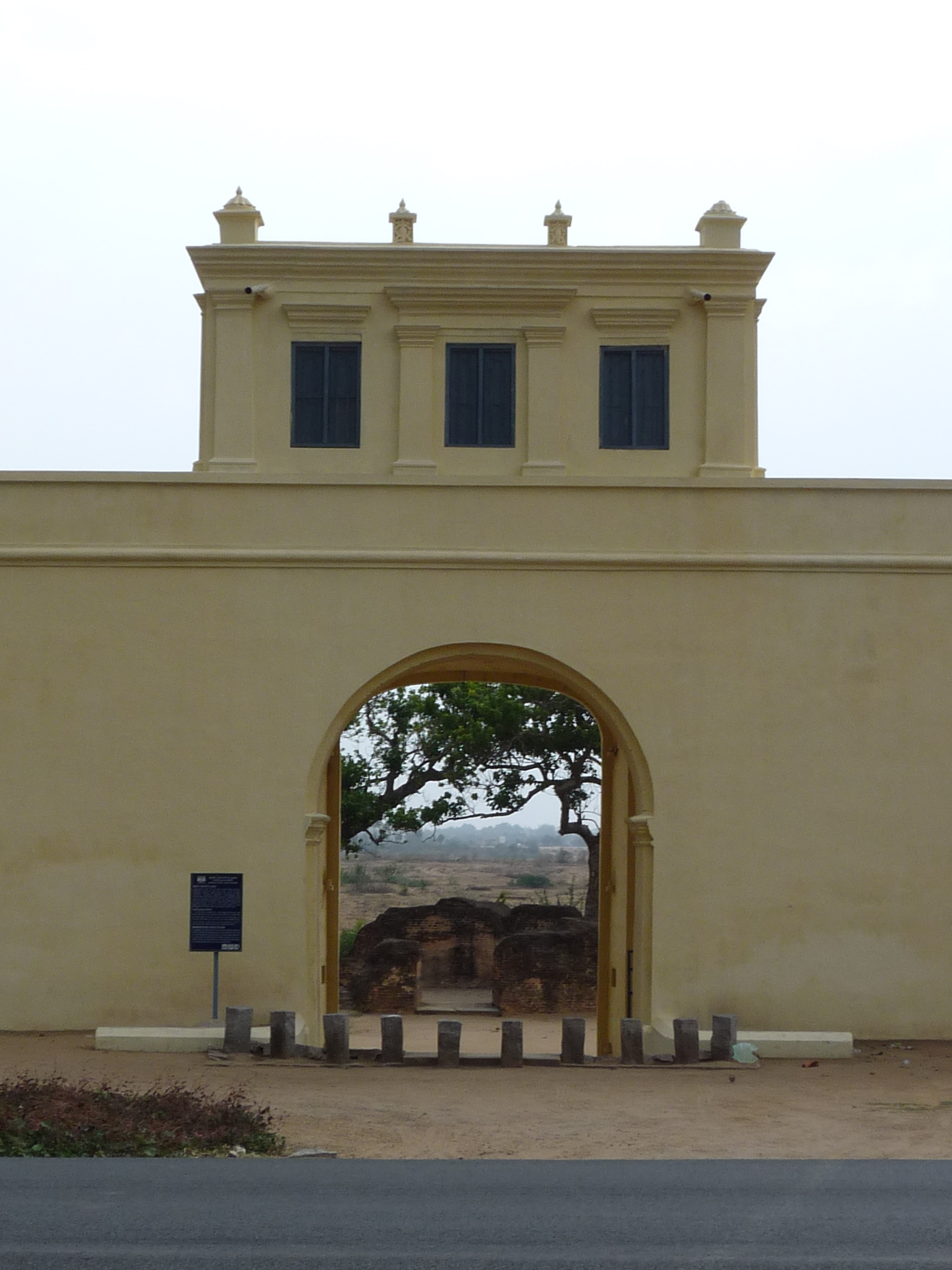
Delhi Gate - Road Side View

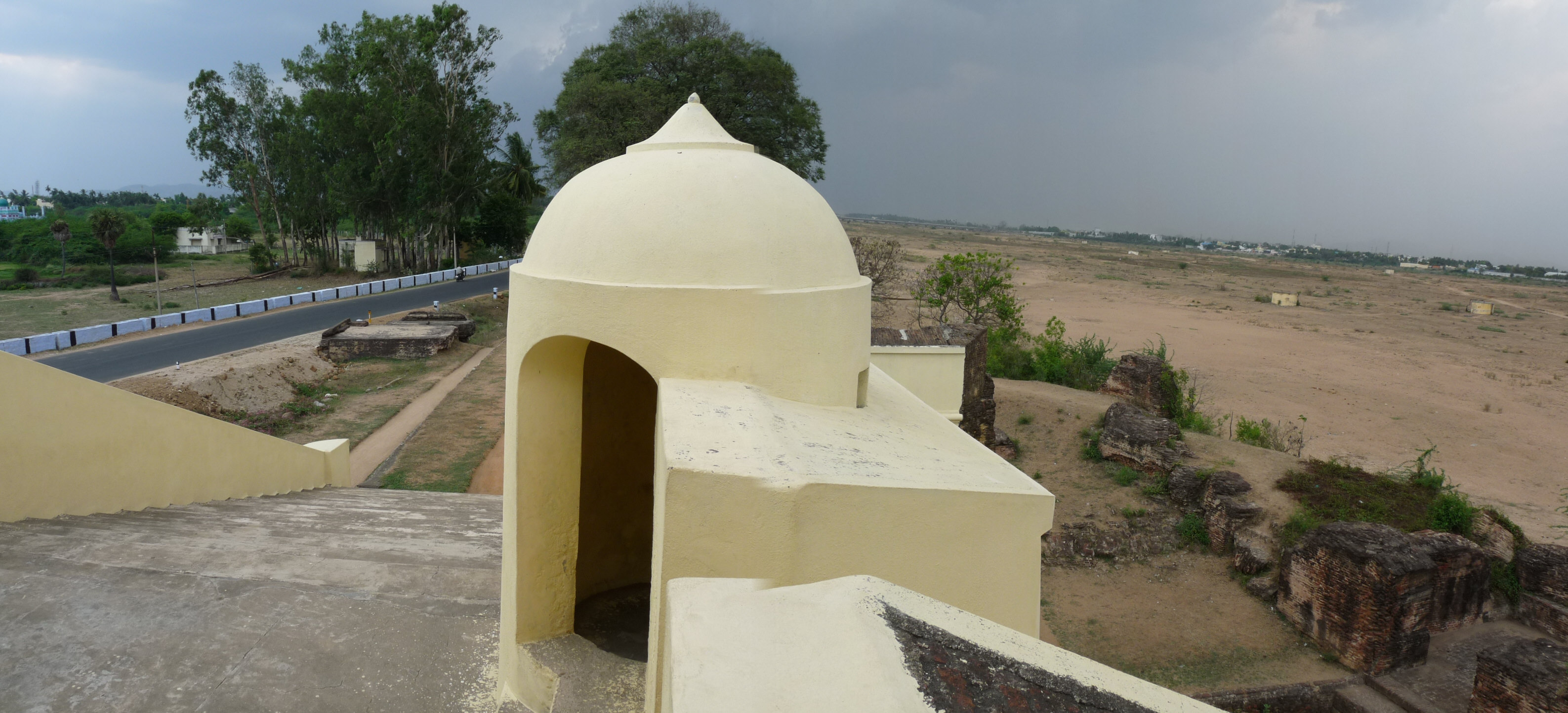
Delhi Gate View
