= Panchapandava Cave Temple =

- Pancha Pandava Temples; Mandapa of the Five Pavadas
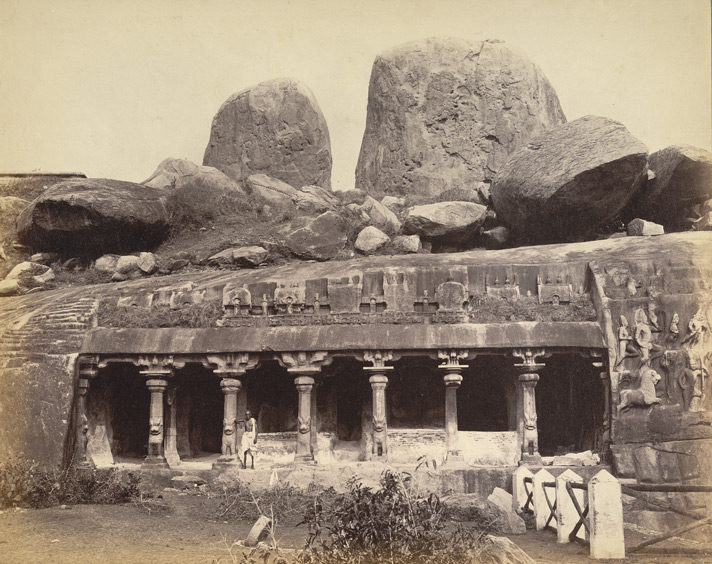
- Pandava Cave Temple, 1860

- Location within Tamil Nadu

Religion
- Affiliation: Hinduism
- District: Kanchipuram district

Location
- Location: Mahabalipuram
- State: Tamil Nadu
- Country: India
- Interactive map of Panchapandava Cave Temple
- Coordinates: 12.6167°N 80.1917°E

Architecture
- Type: Dravidian Architecture
- Creator: Narasimhavarman I Mamalla of Pallava Dynasty
- Completed: c. 7th-century
- Temple: 5
- Inscriptions: UNESCO Inscription as a World Heritage Site in 1984 titled Group of Monuments at Mahabalipuram

Panchapandava Cave Temple (also known as Pancha Pandava Temples and Mandapa of the Five Pandavas) is a monument at Mahabalipuram, on the Coromandel Coast of the Bay of Bengal, in the Kancheepuram district of the state of Tamil Nadu, India. The mandapa (rock sanctuary) is part of the Group of Monuments at Mahabalipuram. It is the largest cave temple in Mahabalipuram. It is an example of Indian rock-cut architecture dating from the late 7th century. The temple is one of the finest testimonial to the ancient Vishwakarma Sthapathis, of rock-cut cave architecture, out of many such caves also called mandapas. Part of the Group of Monuments at Mahabalipuram, the temple is a UNESCO World Heritage Site as inscribed in 1984 under criteria i, ii, iii and iv.

== Geography ==
The Panchapandava Mandapa or Pancha Pandava Cave Temple, is near the open-air bas-relief of Arjuna’s Penance, in Mahablaipuram town. It is situated on the top of a hill range along with other caves in Mahabalipuram, on the Coromandel Coast of the Bay of Bengal of the Indian Ocean. Now in the Kanchipuram district, it is approximately 58 kilometres (36 mi) from Chennai city (previously, Madras) and about 20 miles (32 km) from Chengelpet.

== History ==
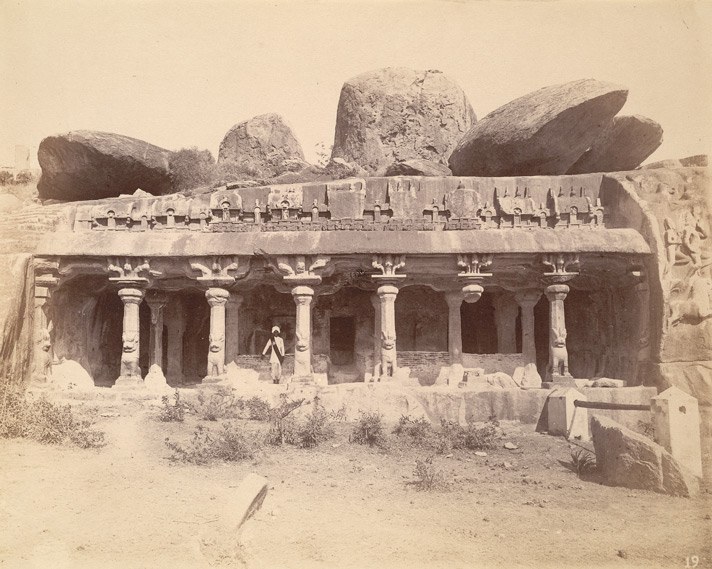
General view of the entrance to the Panchapandava Cave Temple, 1885

The columns of the verandah, which have lion bases are a typical style of Pallava architecture. From the architectural features carved in the cave it is conjectured that this style could be assigned to Narasimhavarman I (Mamalla period) to Narasimhavarman II (Rajasimha) during the mid-7th century.

== Layout ==
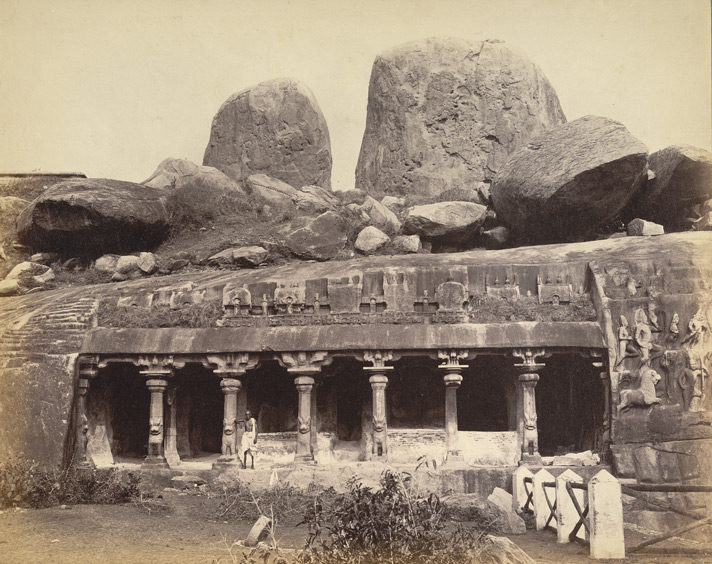
Another view of the Pancha Pandava Cave Temple

The cave temple is unfinished. The entrance is east facing. The temple has the longest cavern, 50 feet (15 m) long, among Mahabalipuram Cave Temples. The length of the opening is indicative of creating a circumambulatory passage within the cave to go round the main shrine.

== Architecture ==
The entrance to the cave has columns resting on seated lions, which is a typical Pallava style of rock-cut architecture. There are six lion based pillars on the front façade of the cave, apart from two pilasters at both ends abutting the rock. As compared to other caves there is an improvement in the layout and the architectural elements that have been carved in the cave. One is the circumambulatory passage around regular structural temples in South India and the other feature is provision of brackets with lion caryatids over the pillars forming the facade; each caryatid consists of three lions one facing to the front and the other two facing to the sides without a lion on the backside. The brackets above the capitals of the pillars have decorations of griffins with human riders also, in addition to the lions. The pillars and pilasters with Yyala base of the pillars and Pilasters are cut out over a square pitha bass plate.

Within the cave, there is long chamber with a second row of four pillars and two pilasters. To the back of this second veranda there is small chamber cut in an octagonal shape flanked by two niches; it is inferred from this that the intended purpose was to carve this chamber to a square plan and making a passage behind it for circumambulation. Only a small chamber has been carved at the centre, which has remained attached to the main rock. At the entrance, the curved cornice has a series of shrines with the four central shrines projecting out. The vaulted roofs of the shrines are carved with kudu horseshoe-arch dormer-like projections and each shrine houses another smaller shrine. The niche below the kudu has a carved deity. Ferocious looking lions are also carved.
