= Madhangeeswarar Temple =

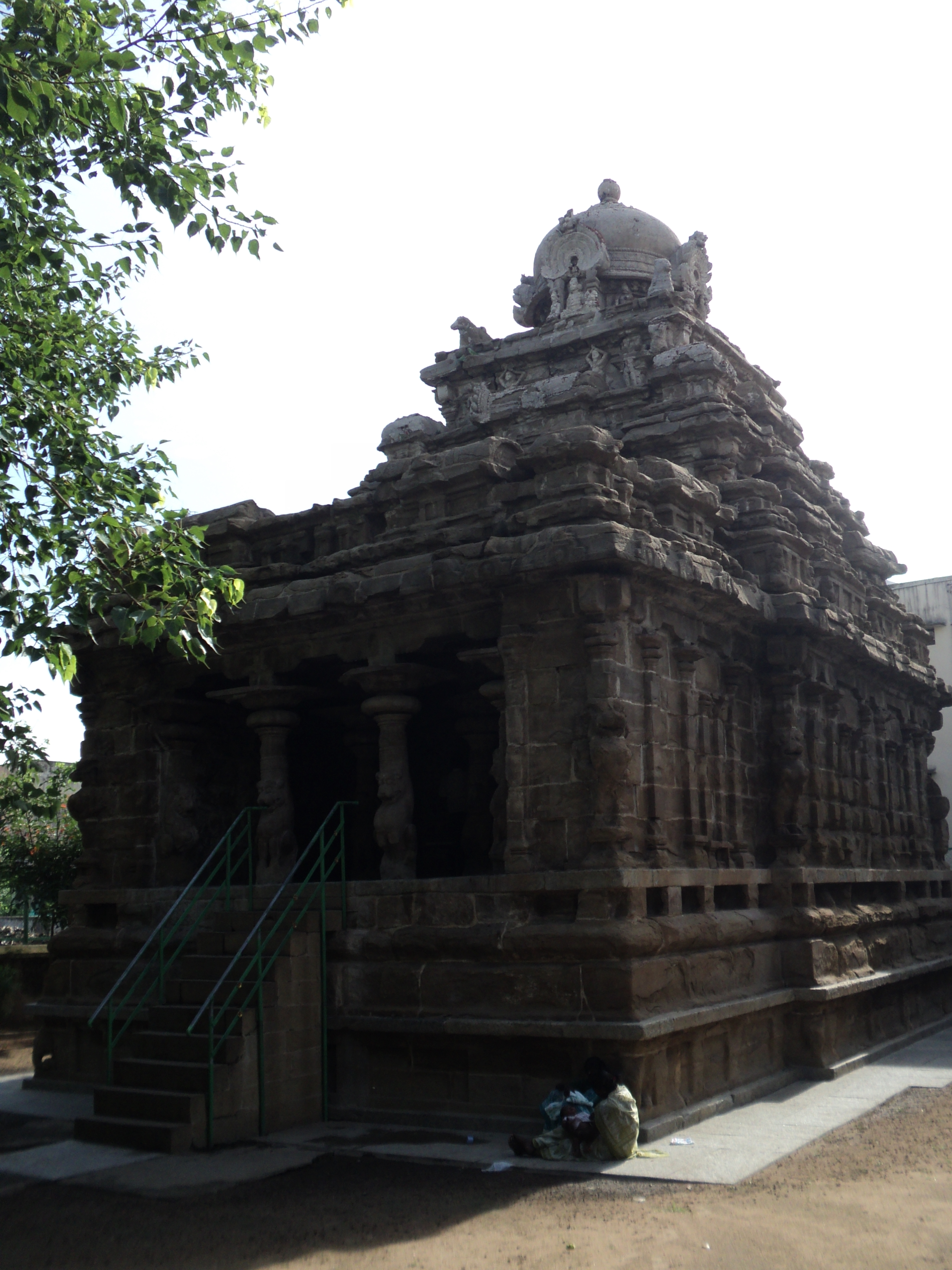
Matangesvara Temple, at Kanchipuram.

Madhangeeswarar Temple is a Hindu temple located in the town of Kanchipuram in Tamil Nadu, India. Dedicated to Shiva, the temple is believed to have been constructed by the Pallavas at the end of the 8th century. The peculiarity of the shrine is that the dvarapalas have four hands.

== Nearest Hindu Temple ==
- Arulmigu Thirumagaraleeswar Temple, Magaral
