= Olakkannesvara Temple =

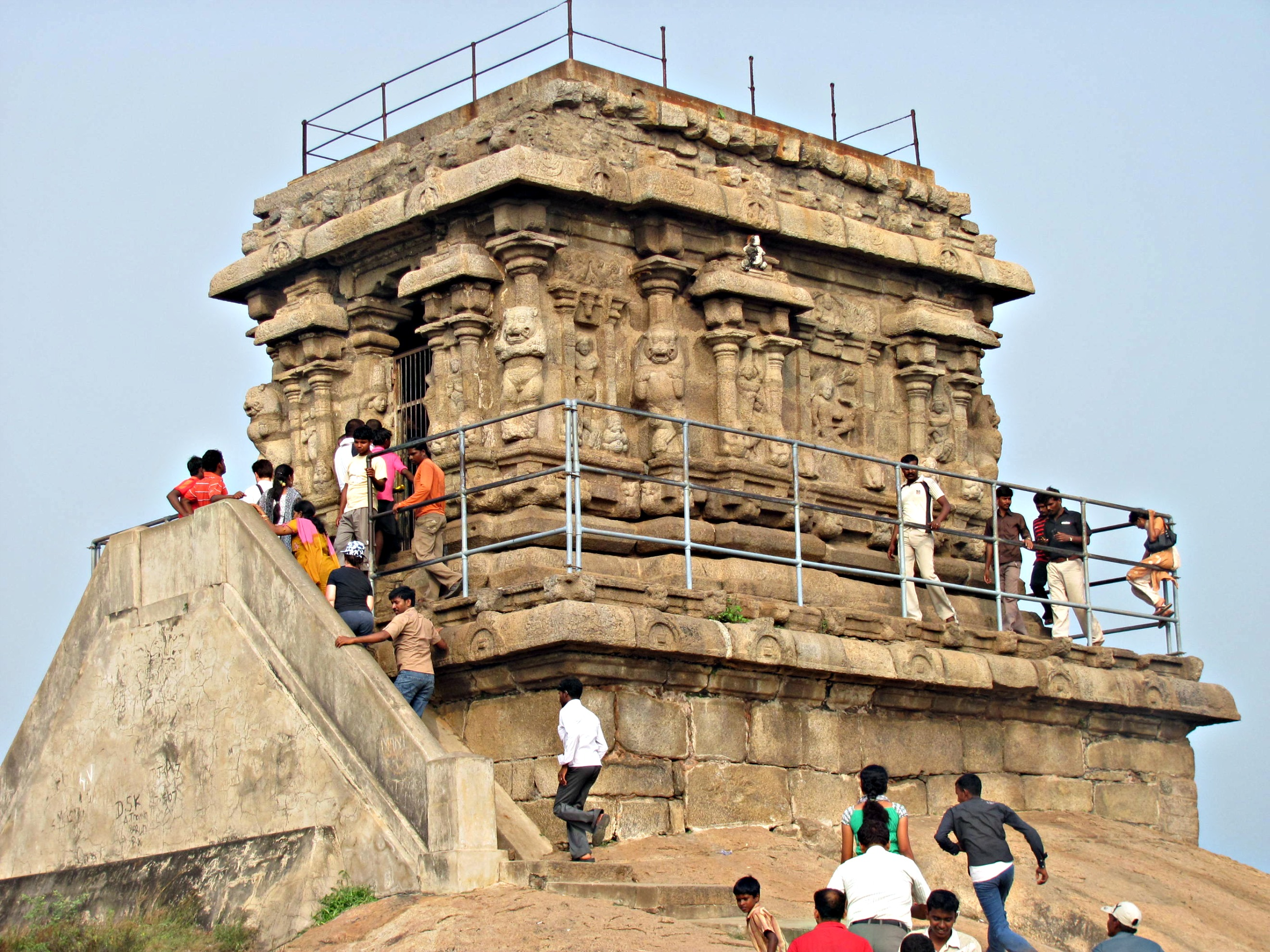
- Olakkannesvara Temple

- Location within Tamil Nadu

Religion
- Affiliation: Hinduism
- District: Kancheepuram district
- Deity: Shiva

Location
- Location: Mamallapuram
- State: Tamil Nadu
- Country: India
- Coordinates: 12.6167°N 80.1917°E

Architecture
- Type: Dravidian Architecture
- Creator: Pallava Kingdom
- Completed: Early 8th century
- Temple: 1

The Olakkannesvara Temple ("flame eye"; commonly Olakkanatha; also known as "the Old Lighthouse") is in Mahabalipuram town, overlooking the Coromandel Coast of the Bay of Bengal in Kancheepuram District in Tamil Nadu, India. Like the Shore Temple, the Olakkannesvara Temple is a structural temple. Built in the 8th century, it is situated directly above the Mahishasuramardini mandapa on a hillock which provides scenic views of the town. As the area is within a high security zone because of a nuclear power station a few kilometres to its south, photography is prohibited. The Olakkannesvara Temple is sometimes mistakenly referred to as a Mahishasura temple. It is dedicated to an incarnation of Shiva. It is one of the Group of Monuments at Mahabalipuram that were designated as a UNESCO World Heritage Site since 1984.

== Etymology ==
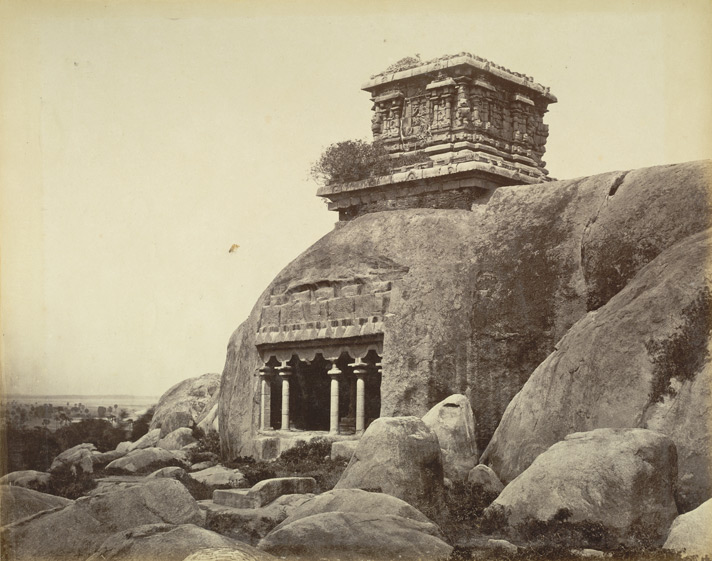
Durga temple or Olakkanneshvara Temple above the Mahishasuramardhhini Cave temple, Mahabalipuram.

Commonly, the building has been known as the "Olakkanatha Temple". Its original name, however, was Olakkannesvara, a corruption of "Ulaikkannisvaram" (meaning: the temple of Siva whose forehead contains the crescent moon or eye of wisdom). Olakkannesvara is mistakenly called a Mahishasura temple as it is situated above the Mahishasuramardini mandapa (cave temple).

== Geography ==
Olakkannesvara Temple is located in Mahabalipuram town. Facing east, the temple is accessed only be a series of cut steps on exposed rock. It is situated on the top of a hill, above the Mahishasuramardini mandapa near the modern lighthouse. It is approximately 58 kilometres (36 mi) from Chennai city (previously, Madras) and about 20 miles (32 km) from Chengalpet. The area is a high security zone as there is a nuclear power station about a few kilometers to its south.

== History ==
Like the Shore Temple, the Olakkannesvara Temple was built during the reign of the Pallava dynasty king Rajasimha during the early 8th century. Archaeologist Albert Longhurst observed that prior to the construction of the present lighthouse at this site in 1900, the roof of the Olakkannesvara Temple served as the lighthouse with perhaps a wooden shed structure on the roof. Worship was offered in this temple till the nineteenth century.

== Features ==
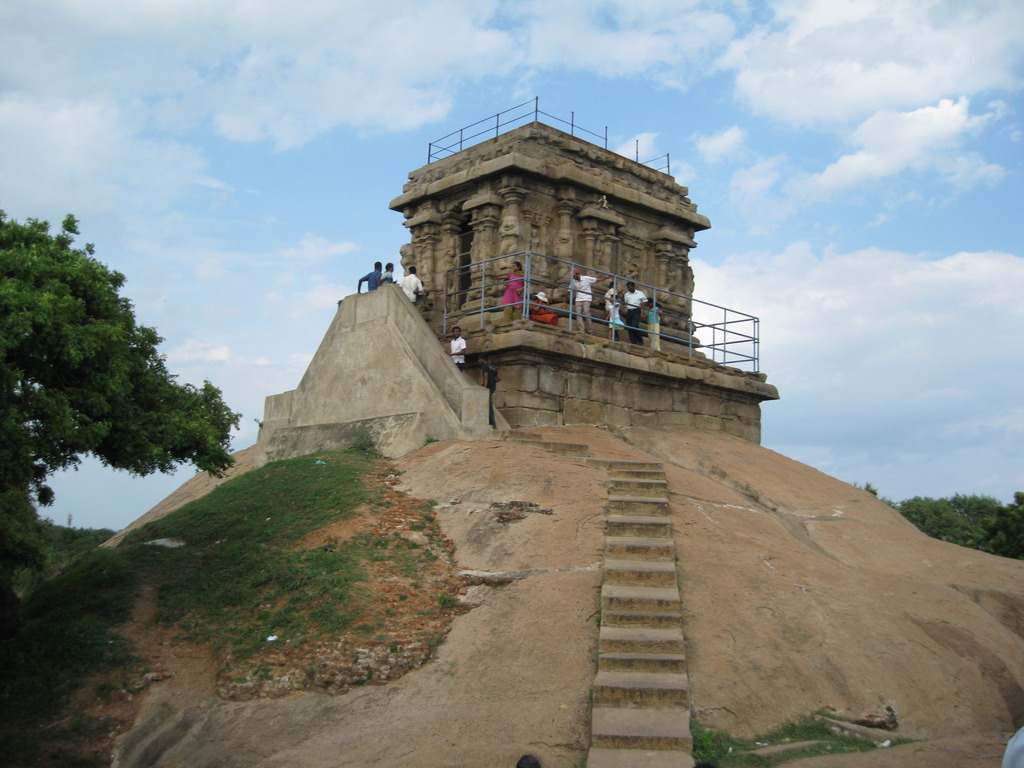
Olakkannesvara Temple

The structure is built of grey-white granite. The shikhara or tower of the temple is interpreted to have been built originally to the same style as the Shore Temple tower in Dravidian Architectural style but is now non-existent. A small ardha-mandapa (half hall) leads into a rectangular shrine. An unusual feature is that of the carving of dvarpalas (guards) of the main shrine, which are in half-profile though the space available could have used to make a full-face profile as per traditional practice of the front facing style. This is typical of Mahabalipuram Pallava style and a similar profile of dvarpalas is noted in the Trimurti Cave Temple. This is interpreted as a transition from the Mahendra style of architecture to the Rajasimha style; the transformation was from a full front facing to three-fourths and then to half profile facing each other. However, the guardians carved on the back wall of the temple are in full frontal profile. The building was formerly lined with brick masonry.

On the exterior walls, there are two sculpted images in the niches of the ardha-mandapa. Enclosed within pilasters, these images of Shiva as Kalantaka killing "Kaala" (Yama) are later additions, not attributable to the Pallavas. On external walls of the main shrine, there are other niches or devkoshtas; on the south wall the sculpture is of Shiva as Dakshinamurti under a tree in seated posture, on the west face an image of Shiva and Parvati seated on Kailash Mountain with Ravana trying to shake the mountain, and an image on the north wall is of Shiva in the posture of Nataraja. The sculptures are much ruined, and were plastered and painted over hence the originality is much less visible. There are a large number of lion pilasters on the walls. There are no images of any deity inside the temple.
