= Dusi, Tamil Nadu =

Dusi
- town
- Location in Tamil Nadu, India
- Coordinates: 12.77°N 79.68°E
- Country: India
- State: Tamil Nadu
- District: Tiruvanamalai
- Elevation: 74 m (243 ft)

Population (2001)
  - Total: 5,102

Languages
  - Official: Tamil
- Time zone: UTC+5:30 (IST)
- PIN: 631702

Dusi is a census town in Tiruvanamalai district in the state of Tamil Nadu, India.

== Geography ==
Dusi is located at 12.77°N 79.68°E. It has an average elevation of 74 metres (242 feet).

This Village have Dusi Mamandur Lake and it is 3 km away from Palar River

== Demographics ==
As of 2001 India census, Dusi had a population of 5,102. Males constitute 50% of the population and females 50%. Dusi has an average literacy rate of 60%, higher than the national average of 59.5%: male literacy is 71% and, female literacy is 48%. In Dusi, 13% of the population is under 6 years of age.
