= Muktheshwarar Temple, Kanchipuram =

Shiva temple in Tamil Nadu, India

Muktesvara Temple, Kanchipuram
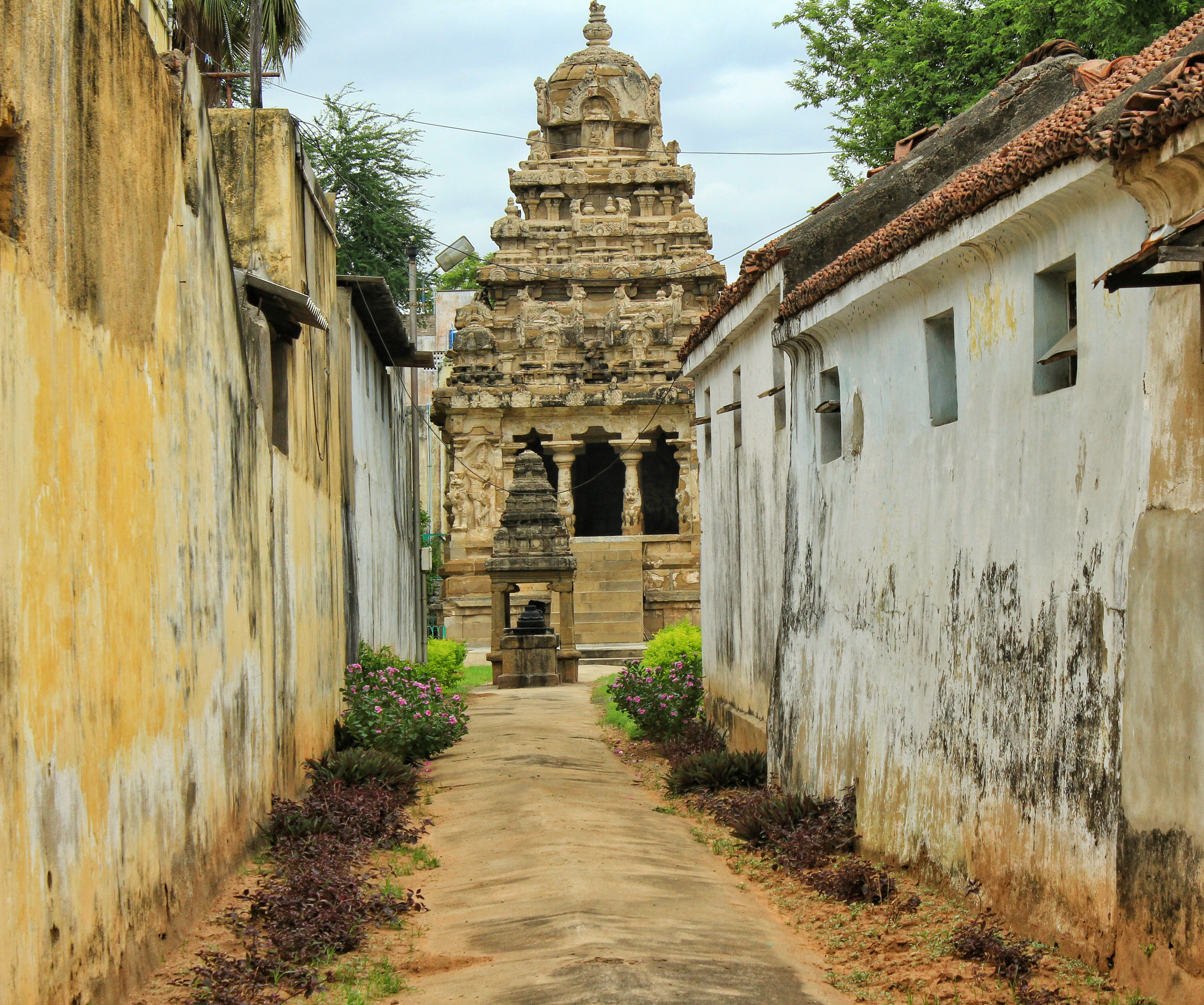

Religion
- Affiliation: Hinduism
- District: Kanchipuram
- Festivals: Maha Shivaratri, Margallhi Thiruvadhirai

Location
- Location: Gandhi Road, Kanchipuram
- State: Tamil Nadu
- Country: India
- Interactive map of Muktesvara Temple, Kanchipuram
- Coordinates: 12.828145°N 79.707565°E

Architecture
- Elevation: 129 m (423 ft)

Muktesvara Temple is a Hindu temple in the town of Kanchipuram, in Tamil Nadu, India. Dedicated to Shiva, the temple was constructed by the Pallavas and has inscriptions dating back to the time of Nandivarman II.

== Nearest Hindu temple ==
- Arulmigu Thirumagaraleeswar Temple, Magaral
