= PV Kalathur =

Pon Vilaintha Kalathur is a village 10 km south of Chengalpattu in the Chengalpattu district in the state of Tamil Nadu, India. The village is located 10 km west of Tirukalukundram.

பொன் விளைந்த களத்தூர் a great poet was born in the town; he wrote Nalavenpa and was a famous poet of the Chola period.

== Religion ==
There are at least five temples in the village.

1.Amman kovil

2.Dharmaraja temple

3.ஸ்ரீ லக்ஷ்மிநரசிம்ஹன் திருக்கோவில்

4.அருள்மிகு முன்குடுமீஸ்வரர் ஆலயம்

== Education ==
- P.P.Government High School, PV Kalathur, Chengalpattu, Tamil Nadu

== Transportation ==
The nearest railway station is Ottivakkam, within walking distance of Pon Vilaintha Kalathur.
