= Ganesha Ratha =

Coordinates: 12.6184°N 80.1925°E

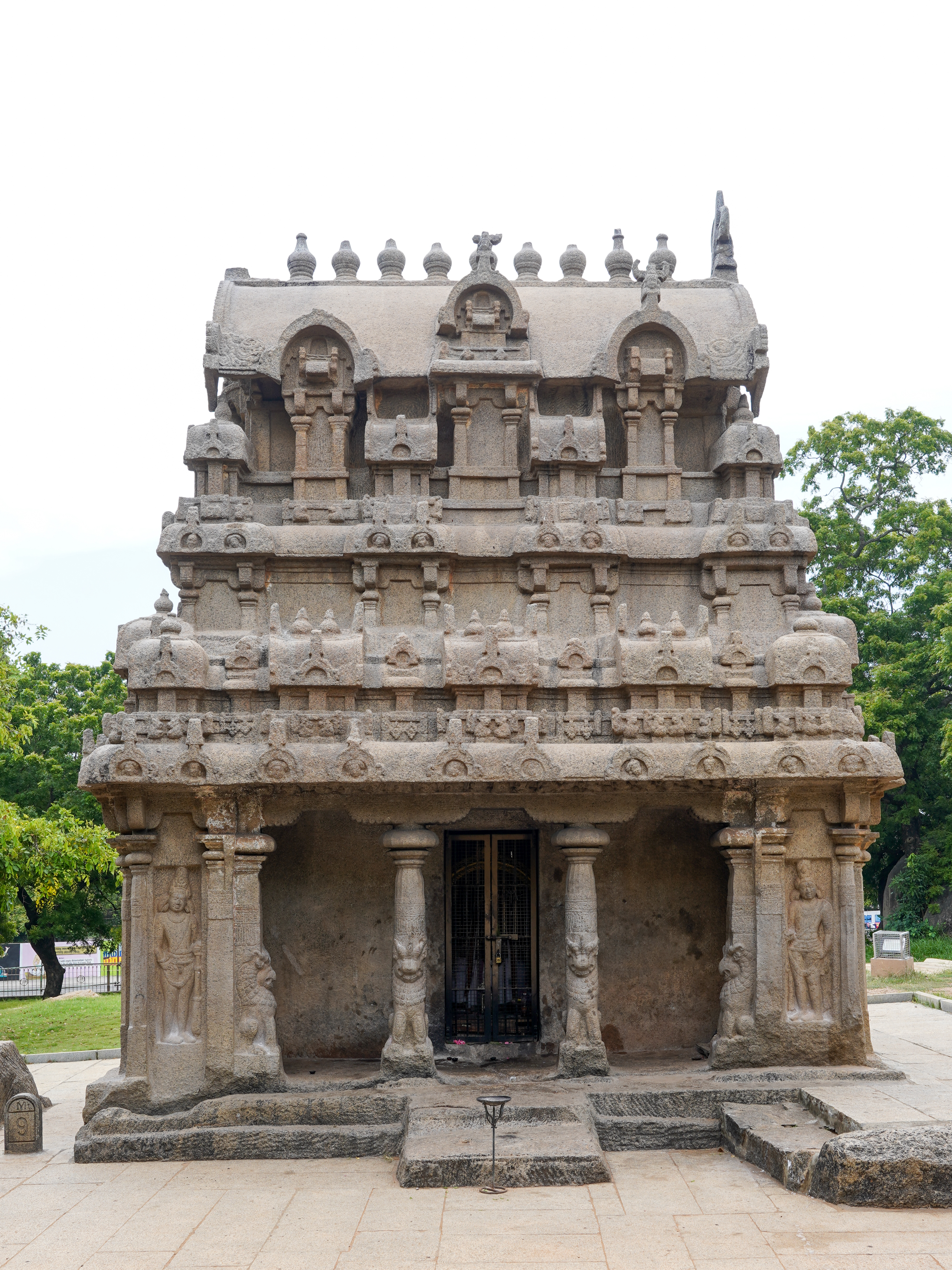
- Ganesha Ratha, front view

Religion
- Affiliation: Hinduism
- District: Kancheepuram district
- Deity: Initially Shiva Linga now replaced by Ganesha

Location
- Location: Mahabalipuram
- State: Tamil Nadu
- Country: India
- Interactive map of Ganesha Ratha

Architecture
- Creator: Mamalla
- Completed: c. 650

Ganesha Ratha is a temple in Kancheepuram district, Tamil Nadu, India. It is one of ten rathas ("chariots") carved out of pink granite within the group of monuments of the Pallava Period at Mahabalipuram, a UNESCO-inscribed World Heritage Site since 1984. The ratha is an example of monolith Indian rock-cut architecture dating from the late seventh century during the reign of King Mahendravarman I and his son Narasimhavarman I. Initially constructed with a Shiva Linga, it is now deified with a Ganesha deity after the linga was removed.

== Geography ==
The temple is located in Mamallapuram, now known as Mahabalipuram, on the Coromandel Coast in the Bay of Bengal of the Indian Ocean, within the Kanchipuram district. Within the UNESCO-inscribed area, there are scores of other monuments. It is located on a hillock to the northwest and on the backside of the rock with the rock relief of Arjuna's Penance (or Descent of the Ganges). Situated 2 metres (6 ft 7 in) from the Varaha Cave Temple, the Ganesha Ratha is west facing.

== History ==
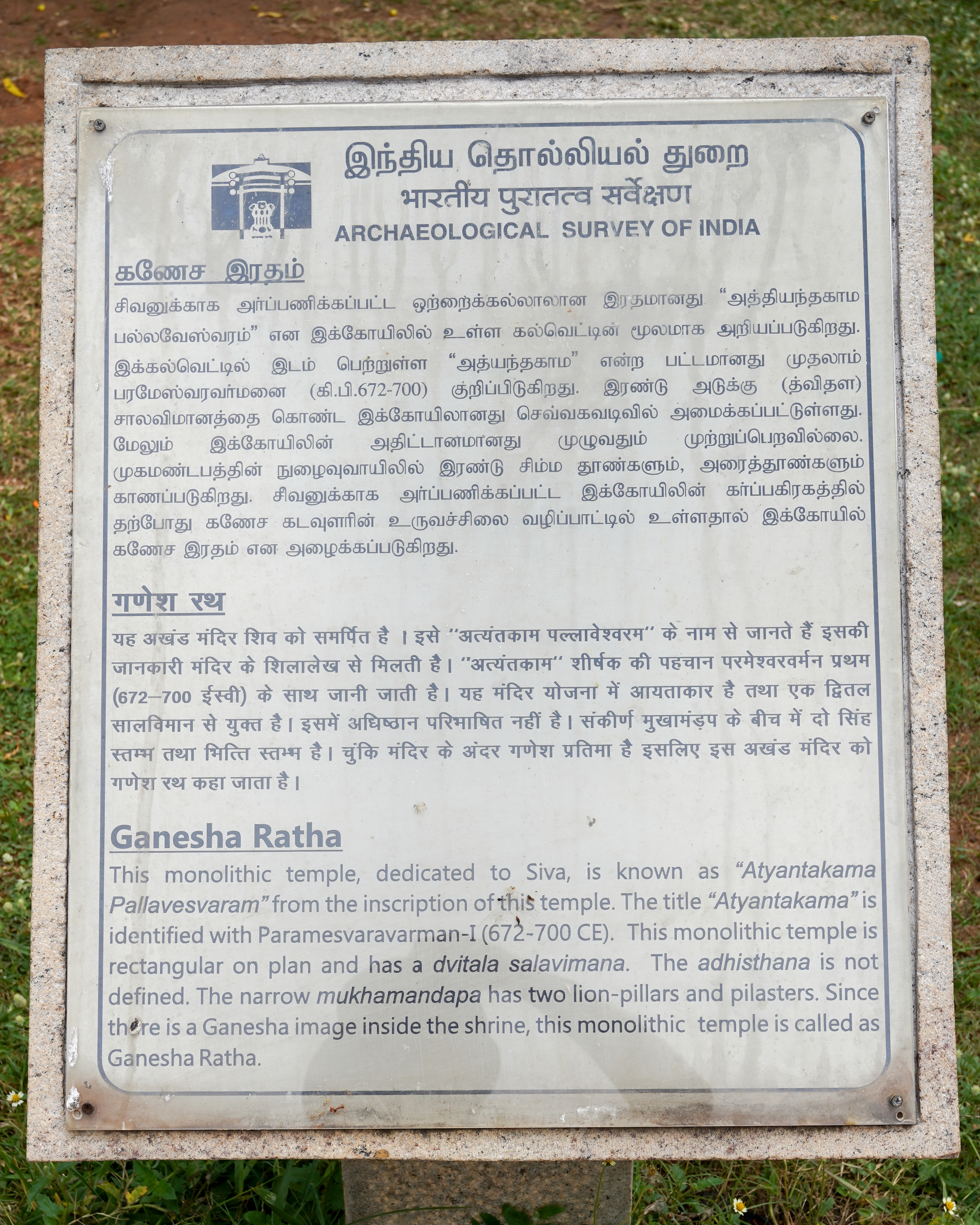
Info board by ASI

The Ganesha Ratha is a fully completed rock-cut structure, while nearby rathas are incomplete. The current stone ratha is a replica of a wooden version which preceded it. Its construction is credited to Narasimhavarman I who reigned 630-668 CE. While it is conjectured that this ratha was built prior to the other rathas of the area, there is no historical evidence to confirm it.

The temple was originally dedicated to Shiva but in the 1880s, villagers replaced the Shiva Linga with an image of Ganesha, after formally seeking permission from the District Collector, and may have been attributed to King George V of the United Kingdom. The original Shiva Linga is installed under a tree nearby. Along with several other monuments, this temple gained UNESCO World Heritage Site distinction in 1984 as "Group of Monuments at Mahabalipuram".

== Architecture ==
=== Layout ===
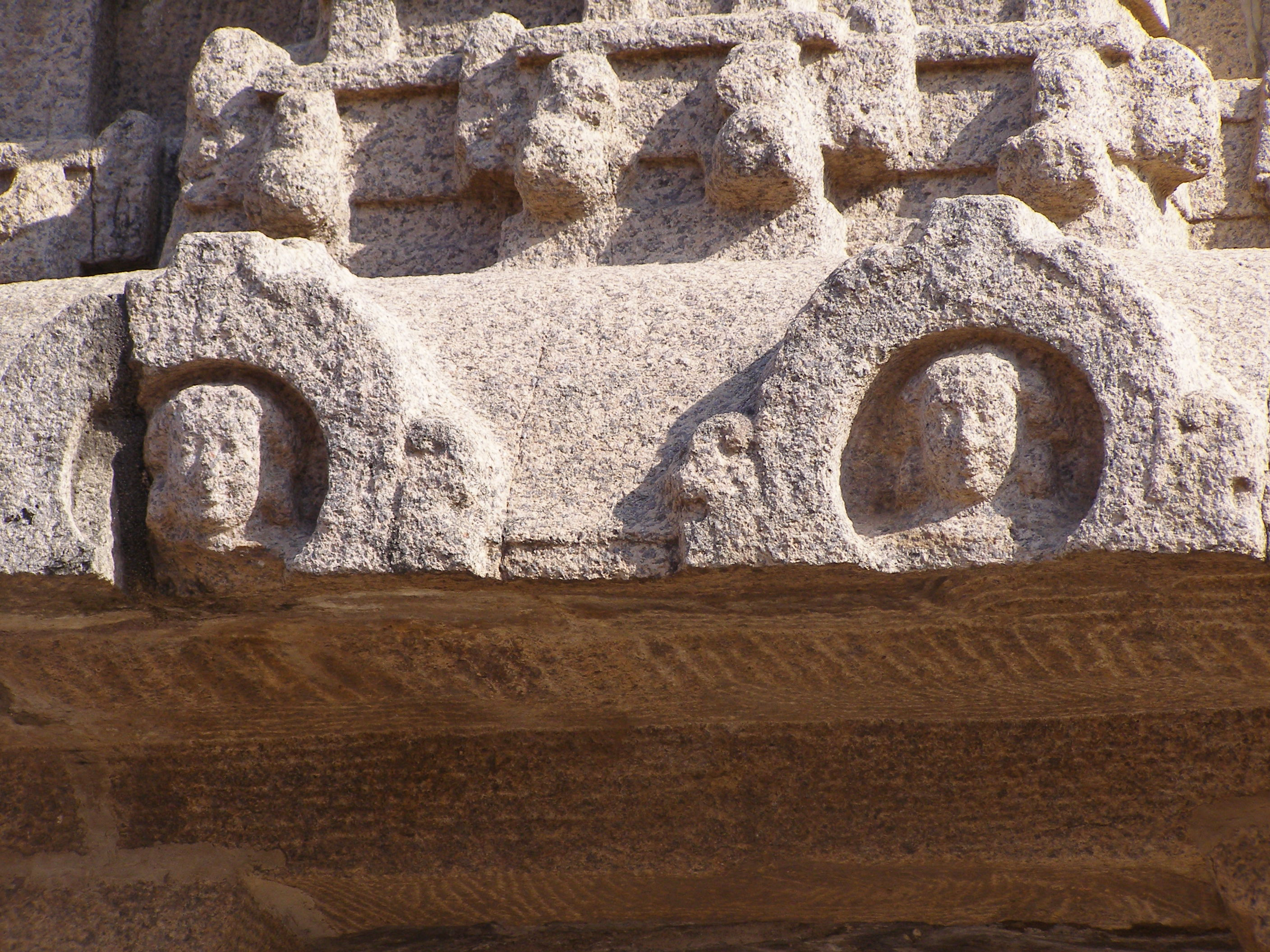
Kudus (Horse-shoe shaped dormer windows) carved on the cornices for the entire length, above the pillars

It is built to a rectangular plan which measures 20 by 11.5 feet (6.1 m × 3.5 m), and is 28 feet (8.5 m) in height on the exterior. The interior rectangular chamber measures 7 by 4 feet (2.1 m × 1.2 m), and is 7 feet (2.1 m) in height. The ratha is three tiered and studded with images and other architectural features which are found in other South Indian temples. The facade is a columned verandah flanked by sculptures of dwarapalakas (guardians). The columns are mounted on seated lions which are the typecast design of Pallava architecture. There are also two pilasters, which are also lion mounted, and they face each other. It is a rock cut structure. The cornices above the pillars have Kudu (Horse-shoe shaped dormer windows) depictions along its entire length and these kudus are also depicted at the gable ends of the roof. Below the gabled roofs, on both long ends windows are carved in horseshoe shape with three doors, the central door has a sculpture of a human head with a trident akin to Shiva. At the other end of the gable, this sculpture is missing. In the back wall between the pilasters, images are not carved. The roof covering above the top floor is large, vaulted, and wagon-shaped, with arches at the corners. The top of the vaulted roof is fitted with a series of nine vase-shaped finials each consisting of a pot and trident.

=== Features ===
There are 18 inscriptions in Grantha and Nāgarī scripts of the Sanskrit language inscribed on its west portico. Out of the fourteen verses in these inscriptions, the twelfth verse is ascribed to Narasimhavarman I's grandson, Paramesvaravarman I, surnamed Atyantakama, who as the Pallava king was known as Atyantakama, Atyantakama-Pallaveshvara-Griham. Other verses are in praise of Shiva.
