= Pallava art and architecture =

Architectural style in 7th-century India

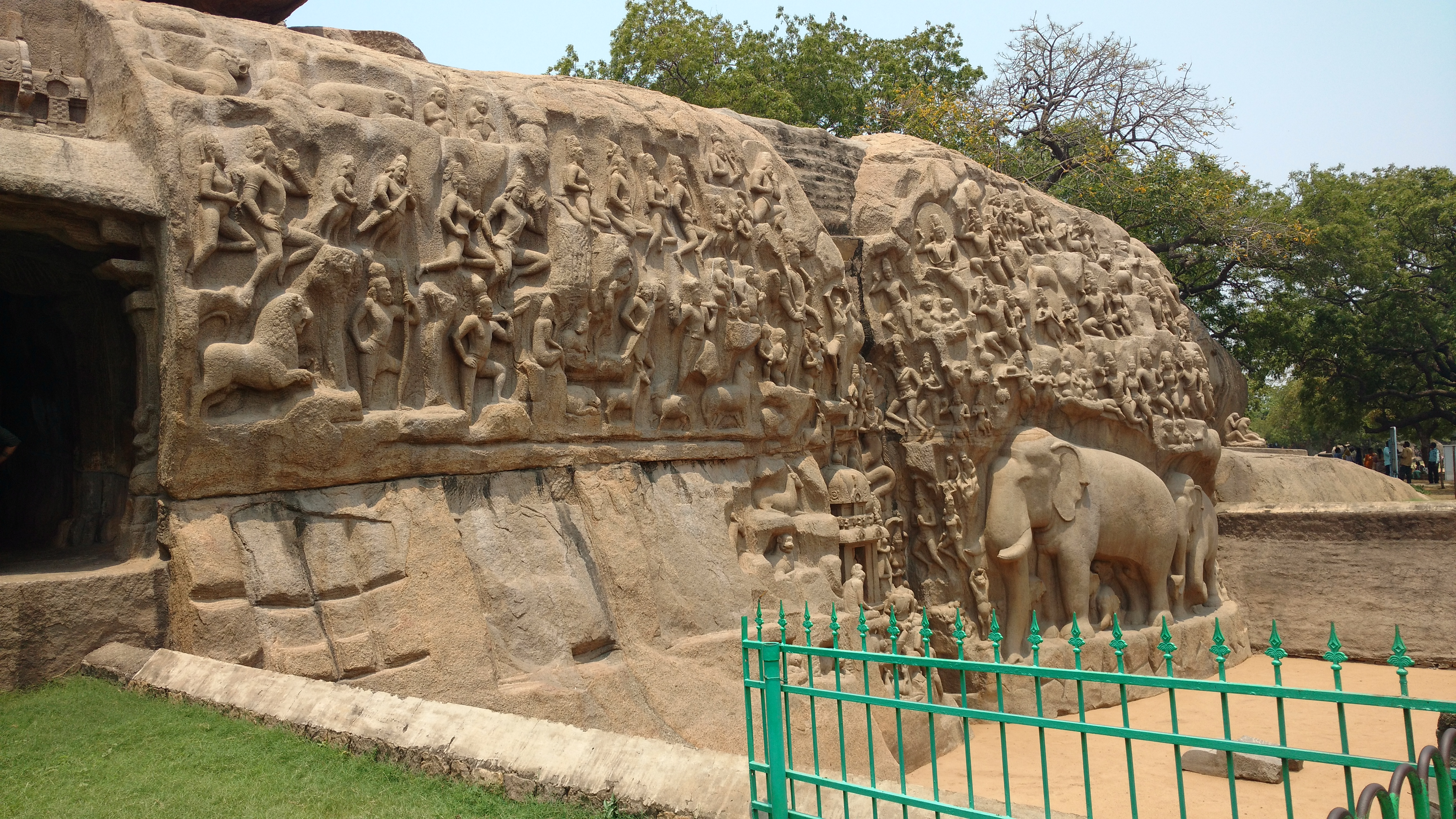
Descent of the Ganges rock carvings at Mamallapuram.

Pallava art and architecture represent an early stage of Dravidian architecture which blossomed to its fullest extent under the Chola Dynasty. The first stone and mortar temples of South India were constructed during Pallava rule and were based on earlier brick and timber prototypes.

Starting with rock cut temples, built between 695AD and 722AD, and archaeological excavations dated to the 6th century and earlier. Pallava sculptors later graduated to free-standing structural shrines which inspired Chola dynasty's temples of a later age. Some of the best examples of Pallava art and architecture are the Vaikuntha Perumal Temple at Kanchipuram, the Shore Temple and the Pancha Rathas of Mahabalipuram. Akshara was the greatest sculptor of their time.

== History of Pallava architecture ==
Pallava architecture was sub-divided into two phases: the rock cut phase and the structural phase. The rock cut phase lasted from the 610 AD to 668 AD and consisted of two groups of monuments, the Mahendra group and the Mamalla group. The Mahendra group is the name given to monuments constructed during the reign of Mahendravarman I (610 AD- 630 AD). The monuments of this group are invariably pillared halls hewn out of mountain faces. These pillared halls or mandapas follow the prototype of Jain temples of the period. The best examples of Mahendra group of monuments are the cave temples at Mandagapattu, Pallavaram and Mamandur.

The second group of rock cut monuments belongs to the Mamalla group from 630 to 668 AD. During this period free-standing monolithic shrines called rathas (chariots) were constructed alongside pillared halls. Some of the best examples of this style are the Pancha Rathas and Arjuna's Penance at Mahabalipuram.

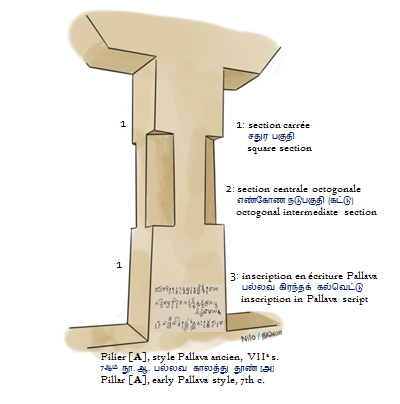
Pallava Pillar Mandagappattu, 7th century

The second phase of Pallava architecture is the structural phase when free-standing shrines were constructed with stone and mortar brought in for the purpose. Monuments of this phase are of two groups—the Rajasimha group (690 to 800 AD) and the Nandivarman group (800 to 900 AD). The Rajasimha group encompasses the early structural temples of the Pallavas when a lot of experimentation was carried out. The best examples of this period are the Shore Temple at Mahabalipuram and the Kanchi Kailasanathar Temple at Kanchipuram both constructed by Narasimhavarman II who was known as Rajasimha. The best example of the Nandivarman group of monuments is the Vaikunta Perumal Temple at Kanchipuram. During this period, Pallava architecture attained full maturity and provided the models upon which the massive Brihadeeswarar Temple of the Cholas at Thanjavur and Gangaikonda Cholapuram and various other architectural works of note were constructed.

== Gallery ==
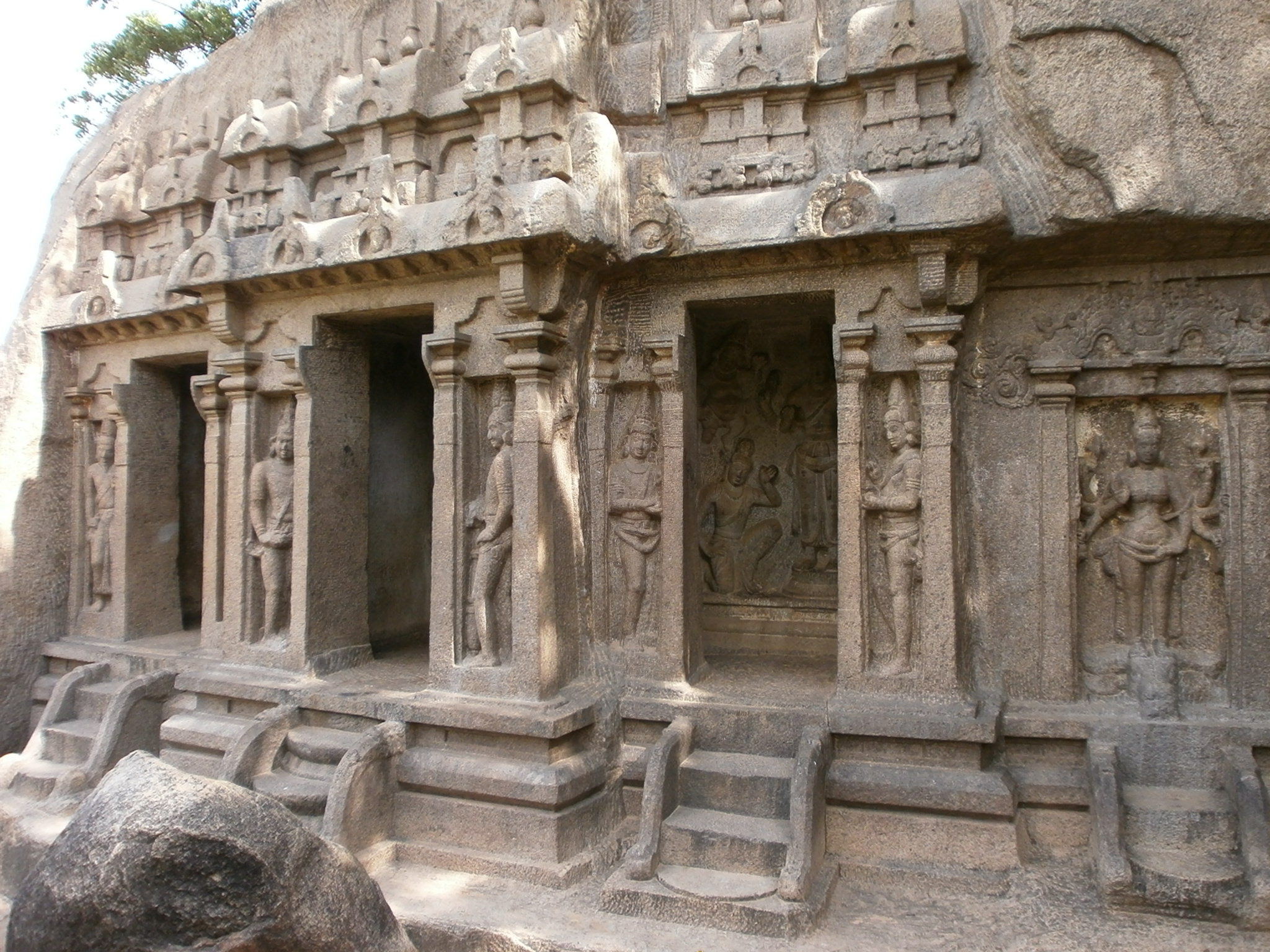
Trimurthi cave

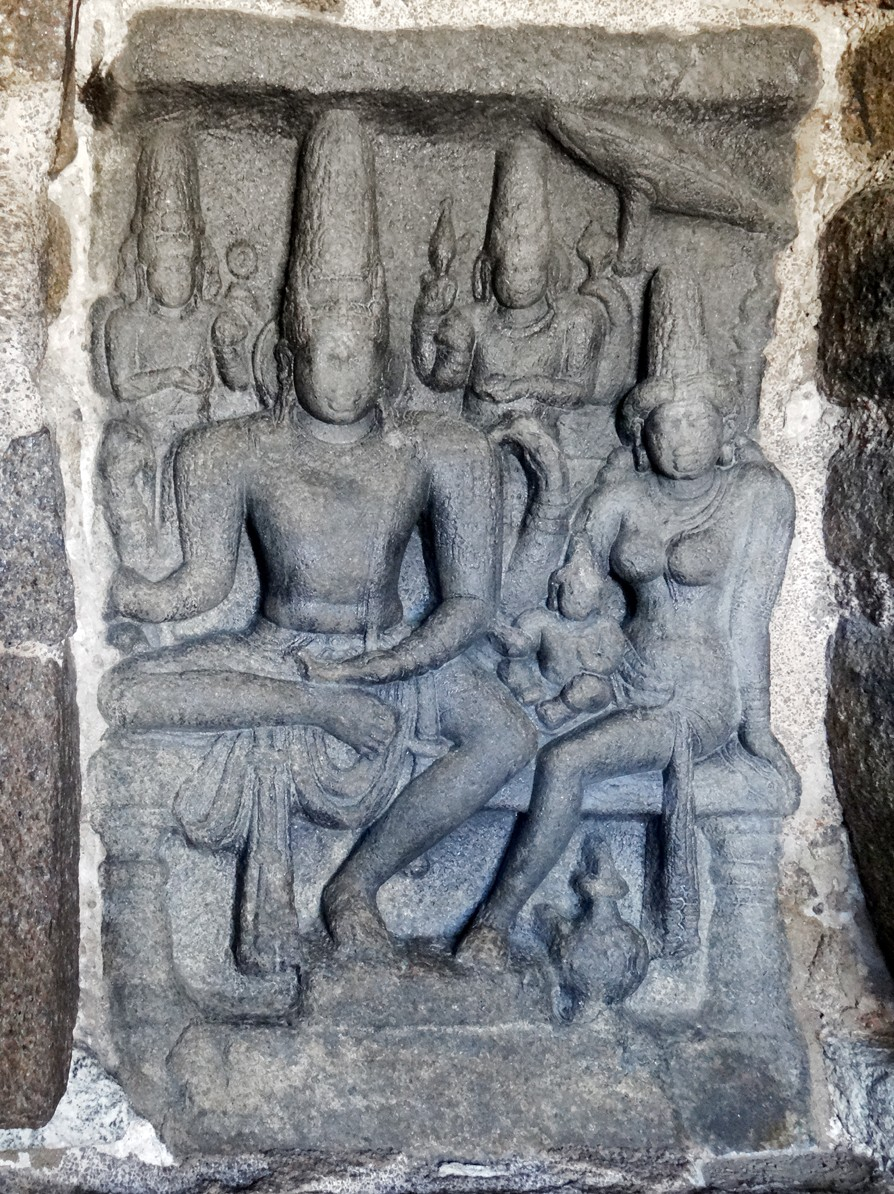
Somaskanda Panel

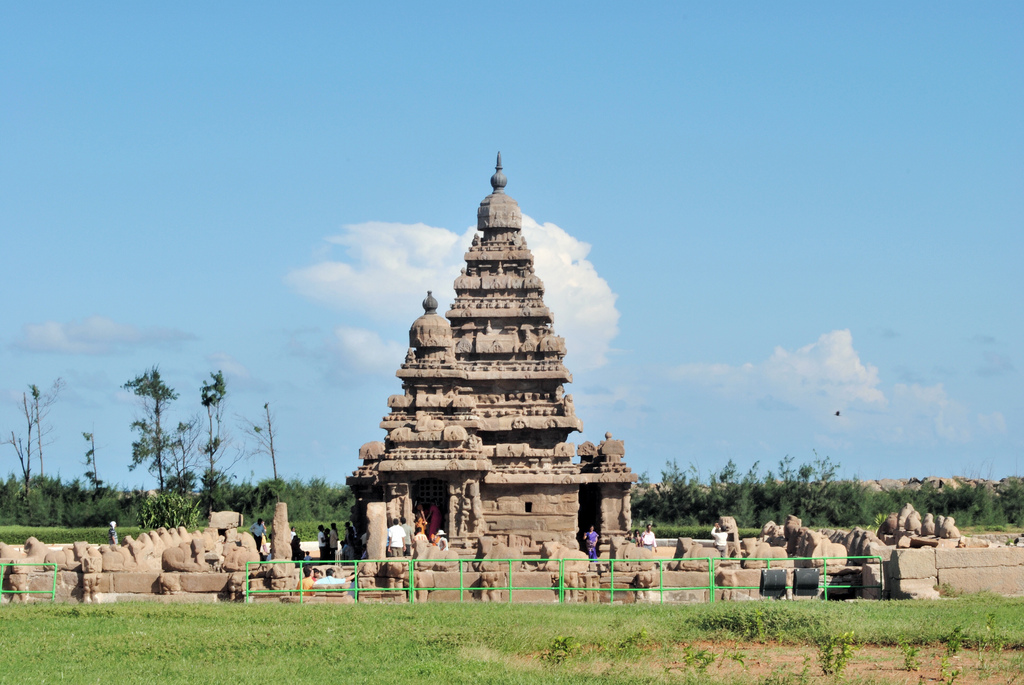
Shore Temple

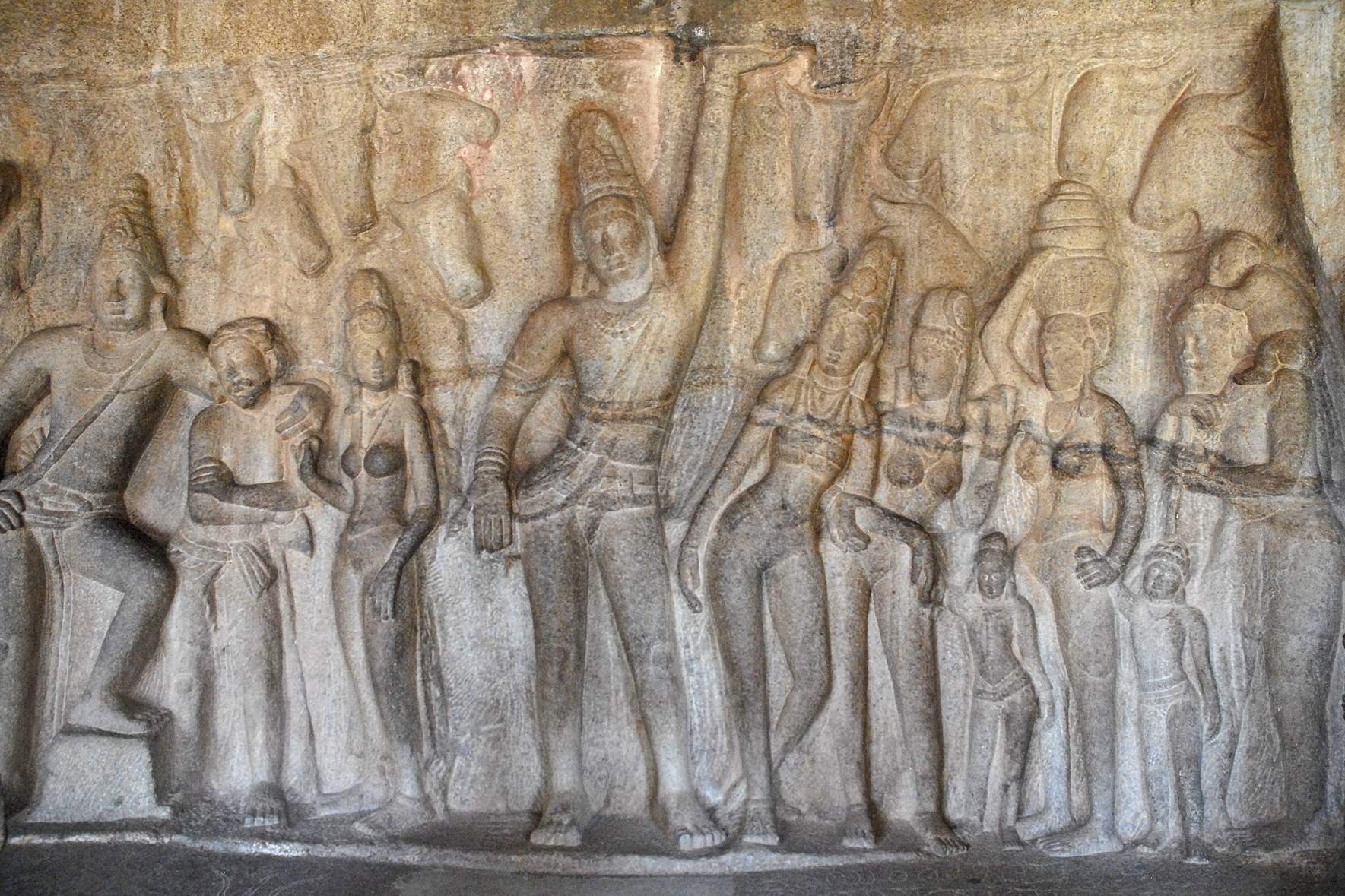
Krishna holding Govardhana giri

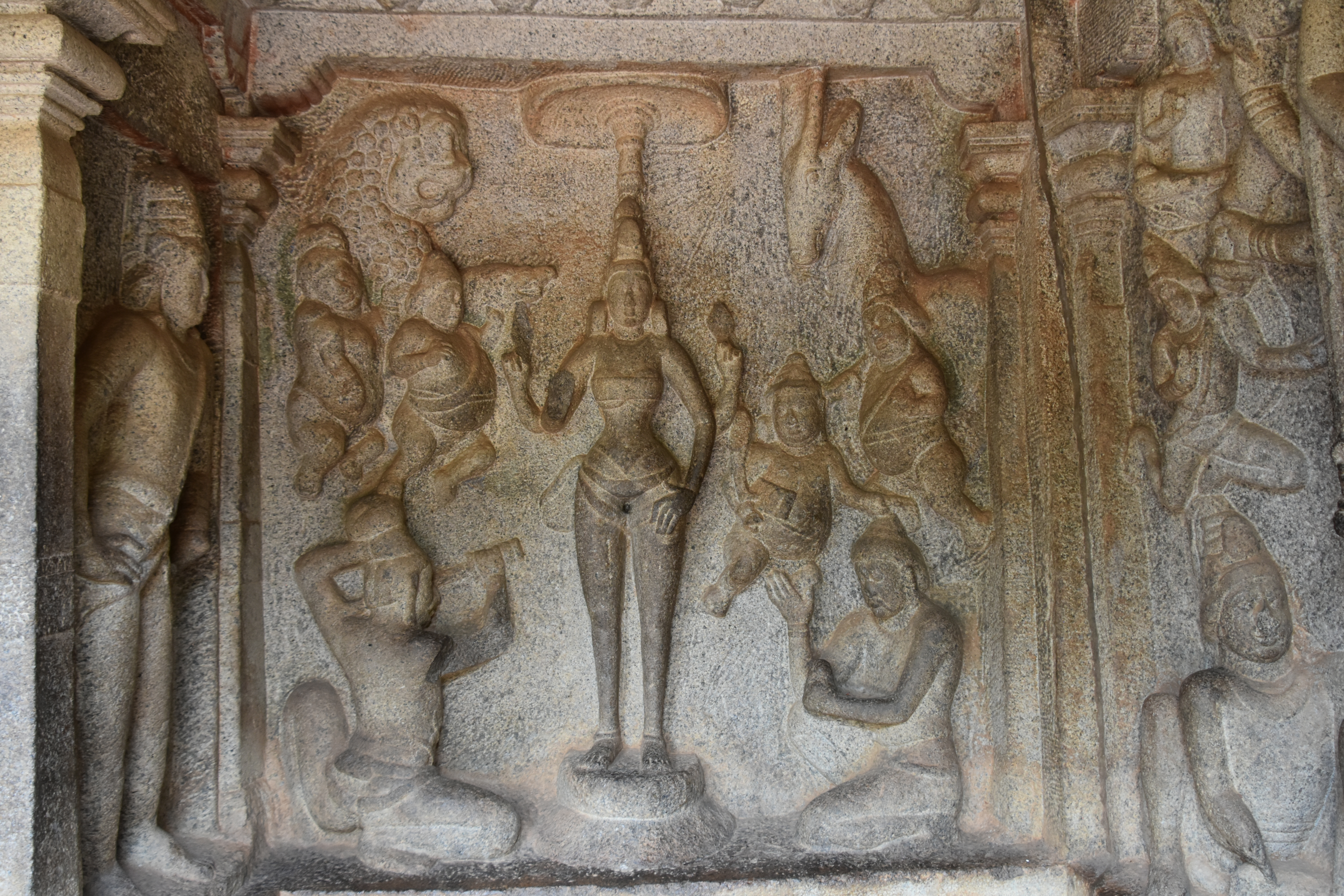
Durga Panel

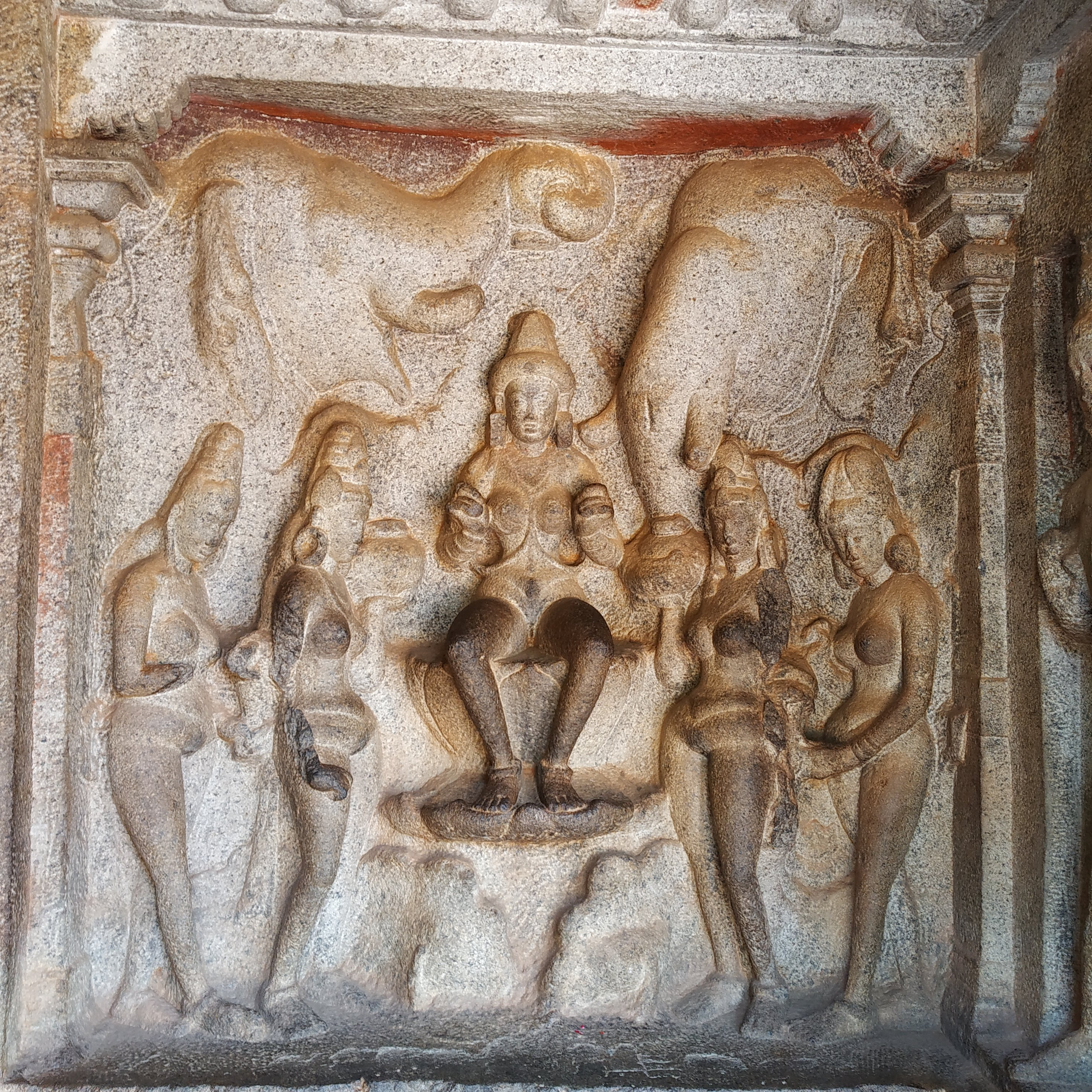
Gajalakshmi Panel

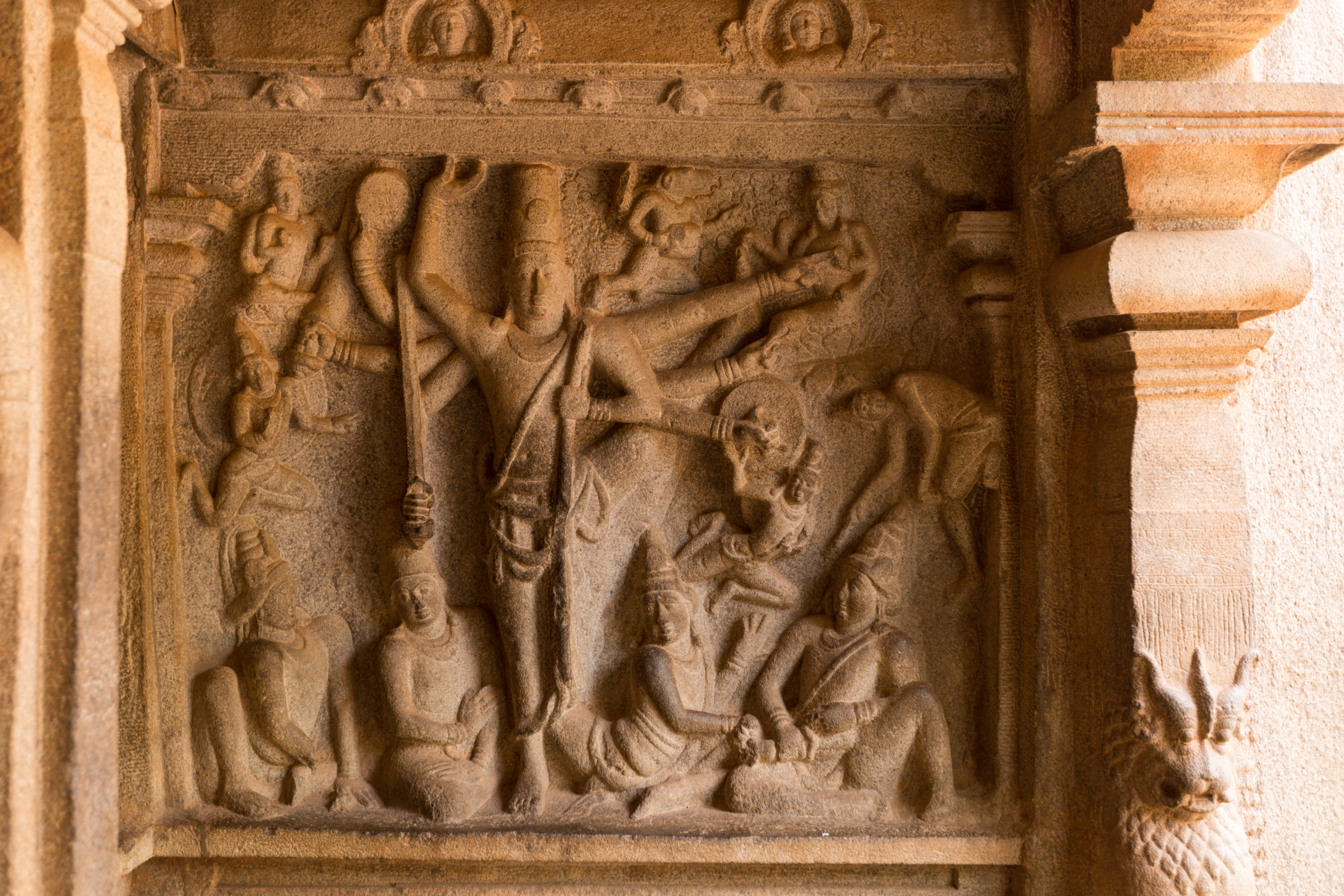
Thrivikrama Panel

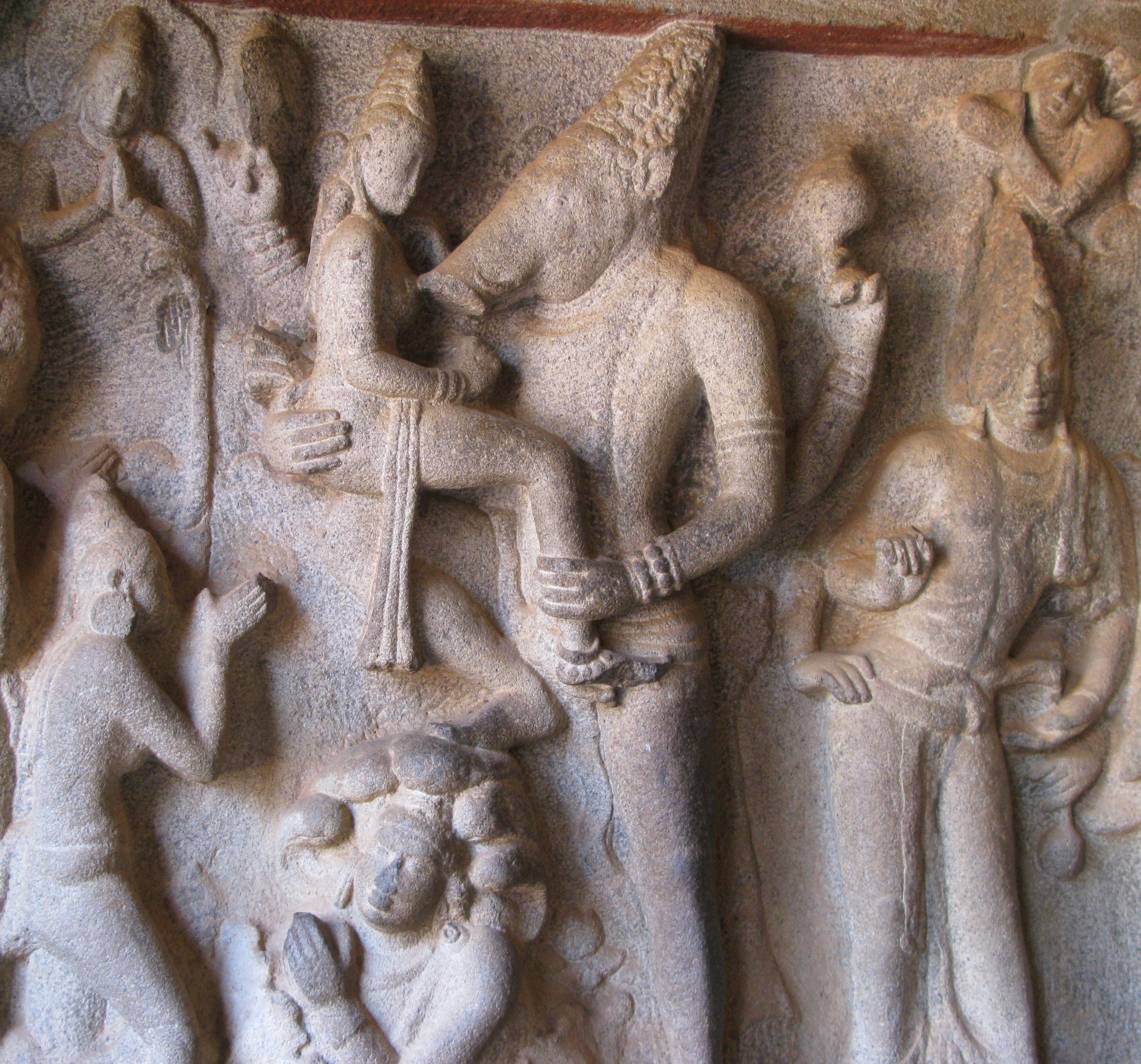
Varaha Panel

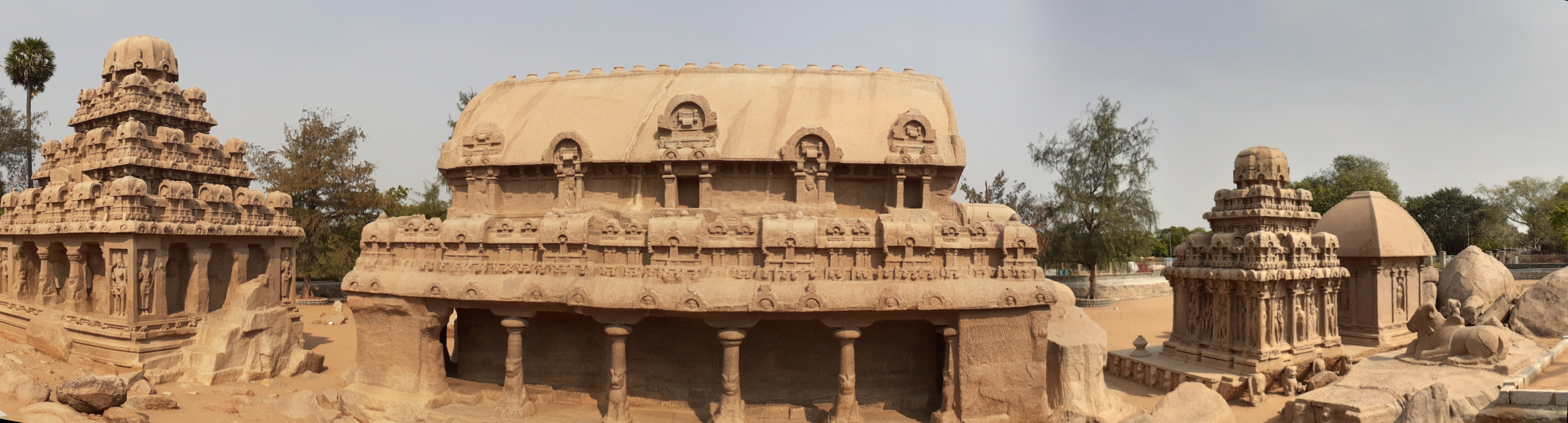
Paranomic view of the Pancha Ratha Temple

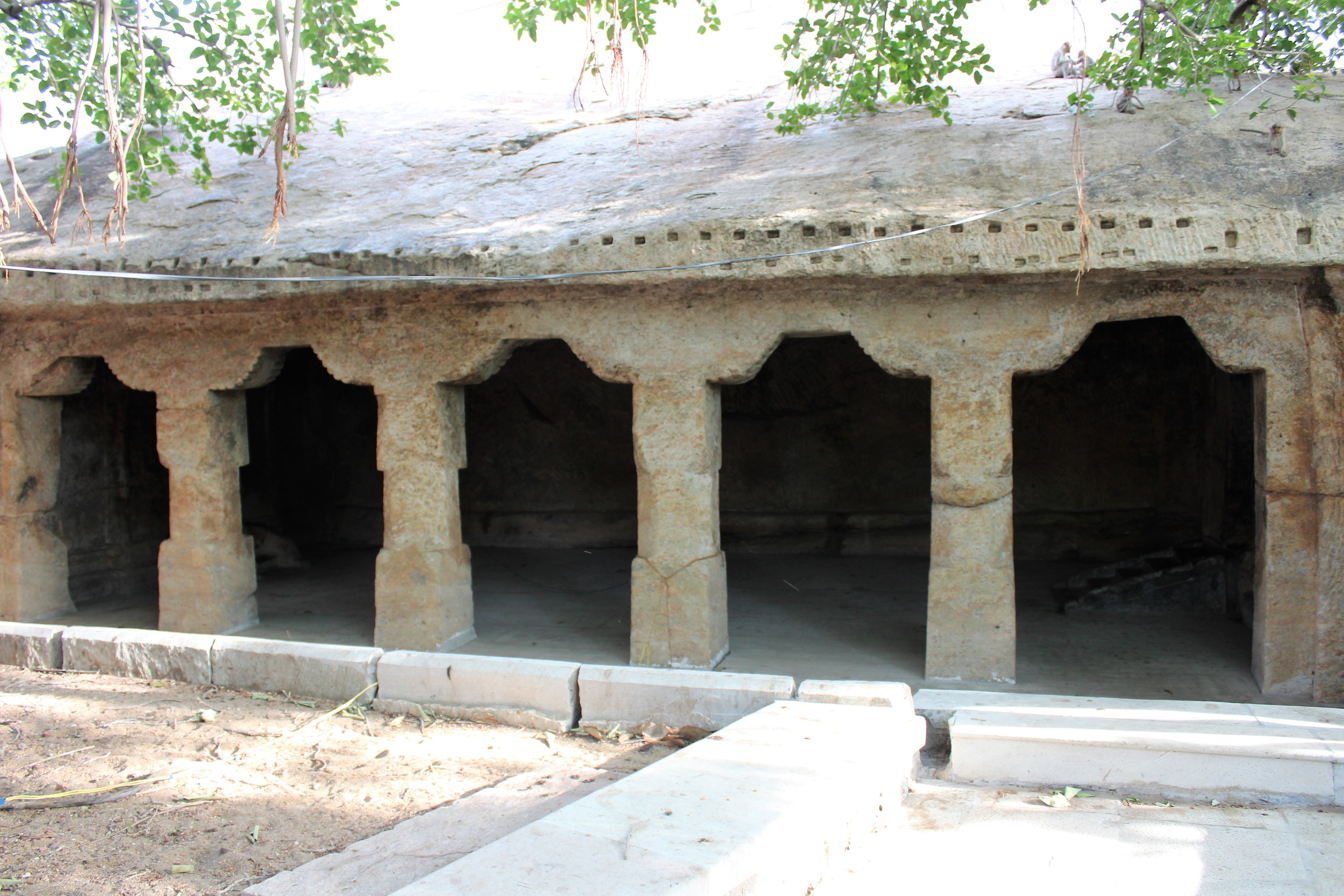
Rock Cut Mandapam by Pallavas at Pundarikakshan Perumal Temple

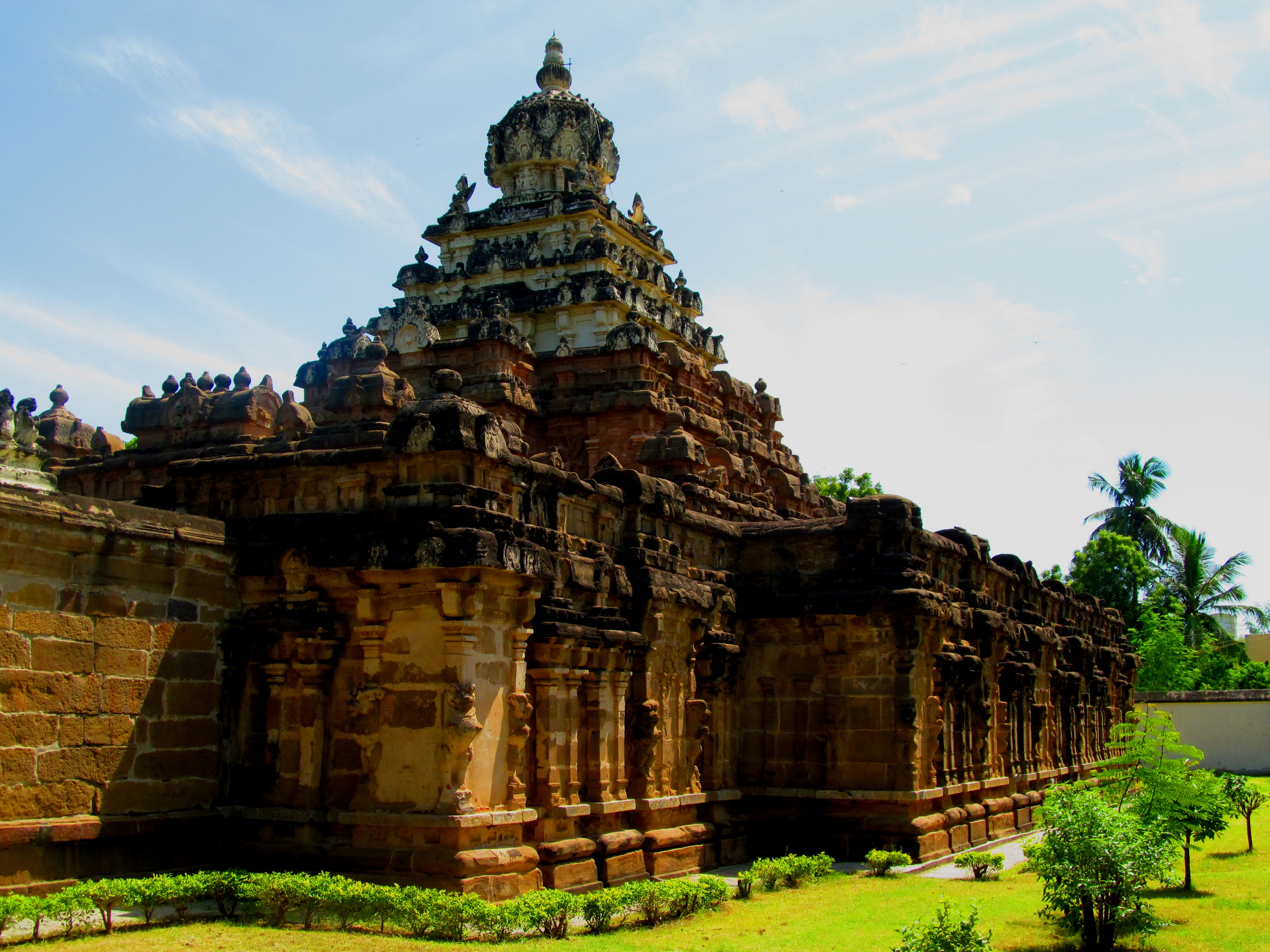
Vaikuntha Perumal Temple

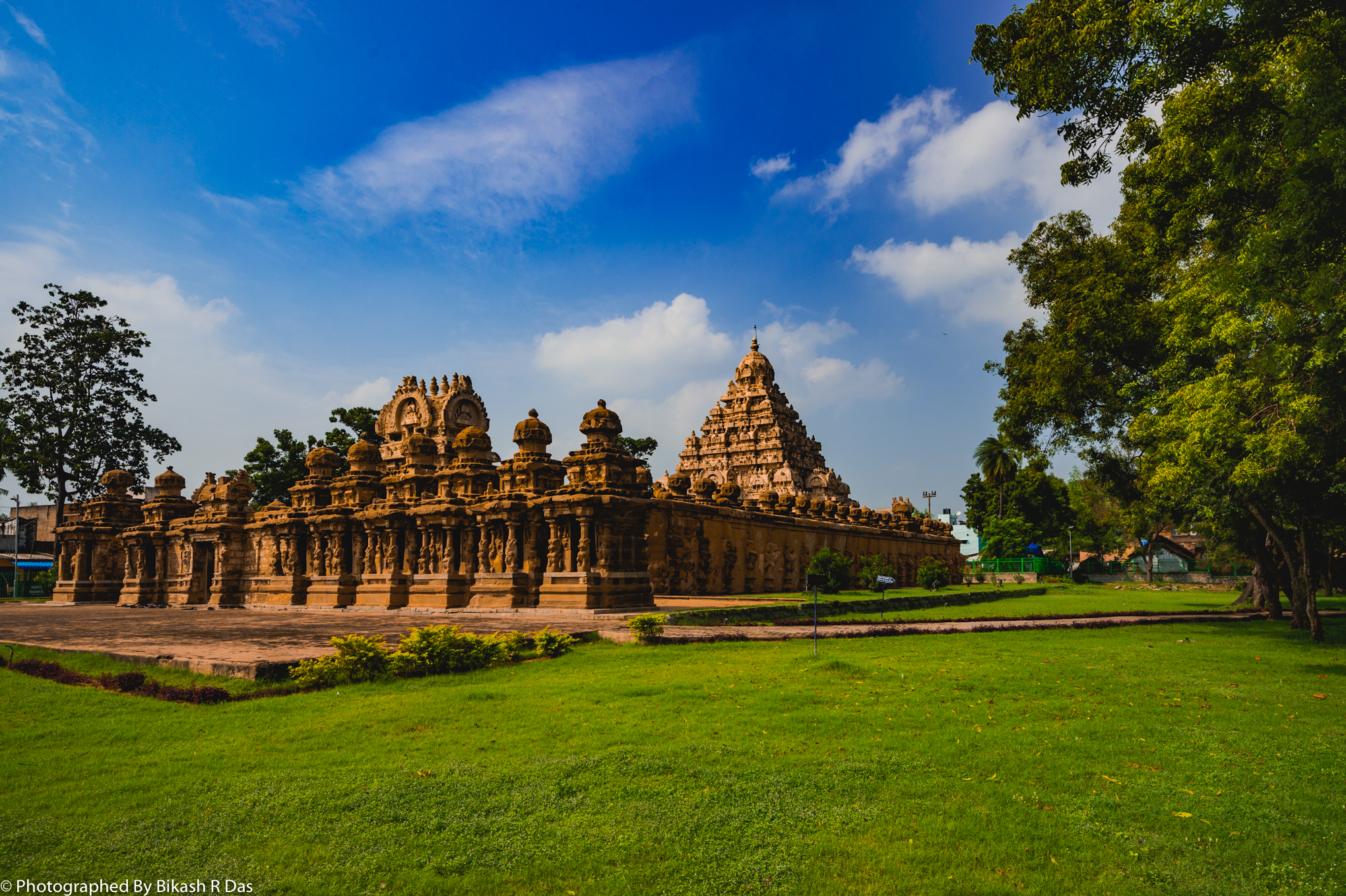
Kailasanathar Temple, Kanchi

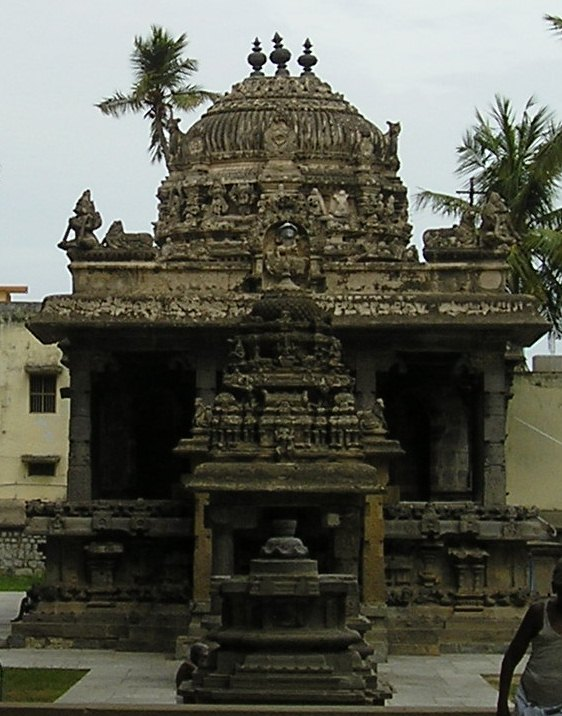
Iravatanesvara Temple

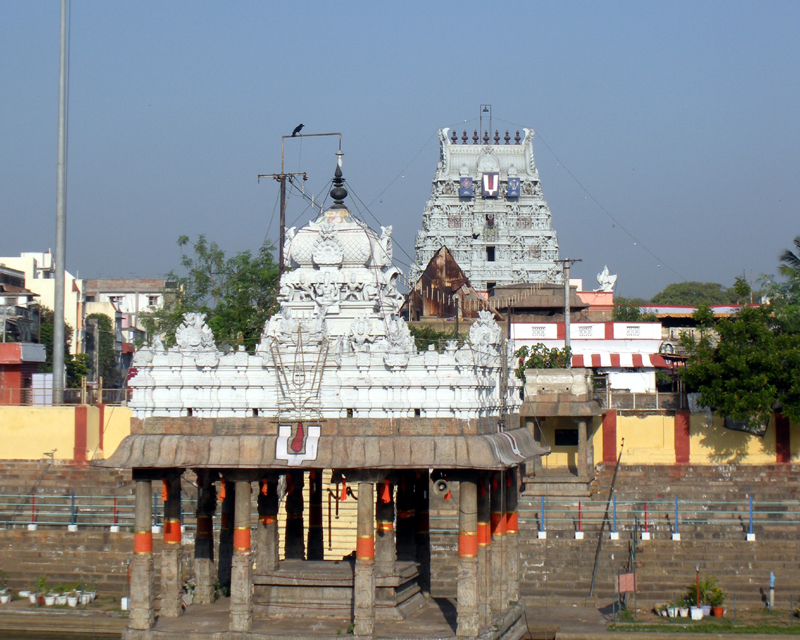
Parthasarathy Perumal Temple, Chennai
