= Art and architecture integration policy =

Art and Architecture Integration Policy (French: Politique d'intégration des arts à l'architecture) is a policy of the Quebec Ministry of Culture and Communications of reserving part of the budget for construction or expansion of a government building or public place to the commission or purchase of artwork for these places.

The budget allocated to the commission of artworks is calculated for each construction project, depending on the cost. It usually equals approximately 1% of the construction cost (which is why the policy is sometimes called the 1% policy).

The Ministry of Culture and Communications implements and coordinates the policy.

== Objectives ==
The objectives of the policy are:

- Commission or purchase of artworks for permanent integrate into buildings or public places.
- Increase the dissemination the work of artists from Quebec and encourage collaboration with architects and users, enriching life by the presence of art.
- Raise awareness of the contemporary art and its various trends and forms of expression.

== See also ==
- Art and architecture of the Pallavas
- Arts & Architecture
