= Paramesvaravarman II =

Pallava emperor from 725 to 731

Pallava emperor
- Reign: c. 725 – c. 731
- Predecessor: Narasimhavarman II
- Successor: Nandivarman II
- Died: 731
- Dynasty: Pallava
- Religion: Hinduism

Pallava Monarchs (3rd–9th Century CE)
- Virakurcha: (Unknown)
- Vishnugopa I: (Unknown)
- Vishnugopa II: (Unknown)
- Simhavarman III: (Unknown)
- Simhavishnu: 575–600
- Mahendravarman I: 600–630
- Narasimhavarman I: 630–668
- Mahendravarman II: 668–670
- Parameswaravarman I: 670–695
- Narasimhavarman II: 695–728
- Paramesvaravarman II: 728–731
- Nandivarman II: 731–795
- Dantivarman: 795–846
- Nandivarman III: 846–869
- Nriputungavarman: 869–880
- Aparajita Varman: 880–897

Paramesvaravarman II was a Pallava Monarch who reigned from 725 to 731. He was slain in battle by the Gangas leaving no heirs to the Pallava throne.

== Reign ==
Paramesvaravarman succeeded his father Narasimhavarman II in 725 and reigned till 731. During his reign, the Pallava capital Kanchi was attacked by the Chalukyas and their Ganga allies and Paramesvaravarman had to surrender and accept humiliating conditions. To avenge this humiliation, Paramesvaravarman subsequently attacked the Gangas but was defeated and killed in battle. Ugrodhaya (A neck ornament) was taken from him and the Ganga King assumed the title Permanadi. Following Paramesvaravarman's death in 731, the Simhavishnu line of Pallavas became extinct.

A hero-stone inscription attributed to his reign indicates that he ruled at least for 6 years. After that Dantidurga helped Nandivarman successor of Parameswaran II to recover Kanchi by warring against the Chalukyas.

Paramesvaravarman II Pallava dynasty
Preceded by Narasimhavarman II	Pallava dynasty 728–731	Succeeded by Nandivarman II
