= Narasimhavarman II =

Pallava emperor from 695 to 728

- Rajaraja; Rajasimha; Rajamalla; Kala Kalan, Kala Vikraman

Pallava emperor
- Reign: c. 695 – c. 728 CE
- Predecessor: Paramesvaravarman I
- Successor: Paramesvaravarman II
- Spouse: Rangapataka; Lokamadevi
- Issue: Mahendravarman III, Paramesvaravarman II
- Dynasty: Pallava
- Father: Paramesvaravarman I
- Religion: Hinduism

Pallava Monarchs (3rd–9th Century CE)
- Virakurcha: (Unknown)
- Vishnugopa I: (Unknown)
- Vishnugopa II: (Unknown)
- Simhavarman III: (Unknown)
- Simhavishnu: 575–600
- Mahendravarman I: 600–630
- Narasimhavarman I: 630–668
- Mahendravarman II: 668–670
- Parameswaravarman I: 670–695
- Narasimhavarman II: 695–728
- Paramesvaravarman II: 728–731
- Nandivarman II: 731–795
- Dantivarman: 795–846
- Nandivarman III: 846–869
- Nriputungavarman: 869–880
- Aparajita Varman: 880–897

Narasimhavarman II, popularly known as Rajasimha and Rajamalla, was a Pallava emperor who reigned from 695 CE to 728 CE. He is credited with the construction of the Shore Temple Complex, the Isvara and Mukunda Temples in Mamallapuram, the Talagirisvara Temple in Panamalai, and the Kailasanathar Temple in Kanchi. He is further credited with the construction of a Buddhist Vihara at Nagapattinam, which is commonly known as the "China Pagoda".

Narasimhavarman's reign was a period of great literary and architectural advancements. He is often grouped by historians with Mahendravarman I and Narasimhavarman I as one of the greatest Pallava rulers.

== Accession to the throne ==
By the time Narasimhavarman II ascended the throne, the Pallavas were by large the most powerful military force in the subcontinent. His father Parameswaravarman I was among the greatest of warrior monarchs of ancient India, the Amaravati Pallava inscription praises him of being: "As vigorous and strong as lord Sambhu (Shiva)".

Parameswaravarman I had subdued all his formidable rivals to extend the Pallava empire far and away. Narasimhavarman II followed up very well. The Vayalur inscription of Pallavas issued on the eve of the coronation of Narasimhavarman II, gives a lineage of 54 rulers through the epochs of Krita, Dvapara and Kali up to Emperor Narasimhavarman II, this includes 47 kings after Aswattaman, the legendary warrior ancestor of the Pallavas.

== Reign ==
Narasimhavarman II, like of most of Pallava monarchs before him, was a great militarist. That the Pallavas were recognized as a major power during his period is testified by the fact that he had a close relationship with Tang China. Mentions of Dvipalaksam indicate Pallava influence in the Lakshadweep during his reign. In general, his period was relatively free from major wars and Pallava domination of Southeast Asia continued.

== Foreign relations ==
=== Relations with Tang China ===
In the 8th century, the Tang dynasty under Emperor Xuanzong, forged a military alliance with the Pallavas under Narasimhavarman II and made the latter the General of South China to safeguard Chinese territories and interests from the expanding Tibetan Empire.

Narasimhavarman II sent an embassy to Tang China to inform the Chinese Emperor Xuanzong of his intention to employ his war elephants and his cavalry to chastise the Ta-che (Arabs) and T’ou-po (Tibetans) and request the emperor to give a name to his army, as sign of friendly gesture. The emperor praised it greatly and named his army, ‘the army which cherished virtue’. This embassy was sent in about 720 CE. The historian Nilakanta Sastri states that this embassy was definitely led by the venerated Southern Indian Buddhist Monk Vajrabodhi. The Chinese emperor also sent an ambassador to confer by brevet the title of General of South China on the 'King of the kingdom of South India', Che-li-Na-lo-seng-k’ia pao-to-pa-mo (Sri Narasimha Potavarman). It is also noteworthy that Narasimhavarman II built a temple in the honor of the Tang Chinese emperor and asked a name for this temple from the emperor. He was sent an inscribed tablet reading Koei-hoa se, meaning 'which cause to return virtue’. This temple could be the Buddhist Vihara, commonly known as 'China-pagoda' constructed by him at Nagapattinam.

The historian Nilakanta Sastri states that "Separately or allied together, the Arabs and the Tibetans were more the enemies of China in this period than of any Indian state, least of all a Southern Indian state, and one Tibetan power may reasonably surmise that it was the Chinese court which, being impressed by the political power of Narasimhavarman in India, was anxious to enlist his support in its plans against the Tibetans".

== Contributions to literature ==
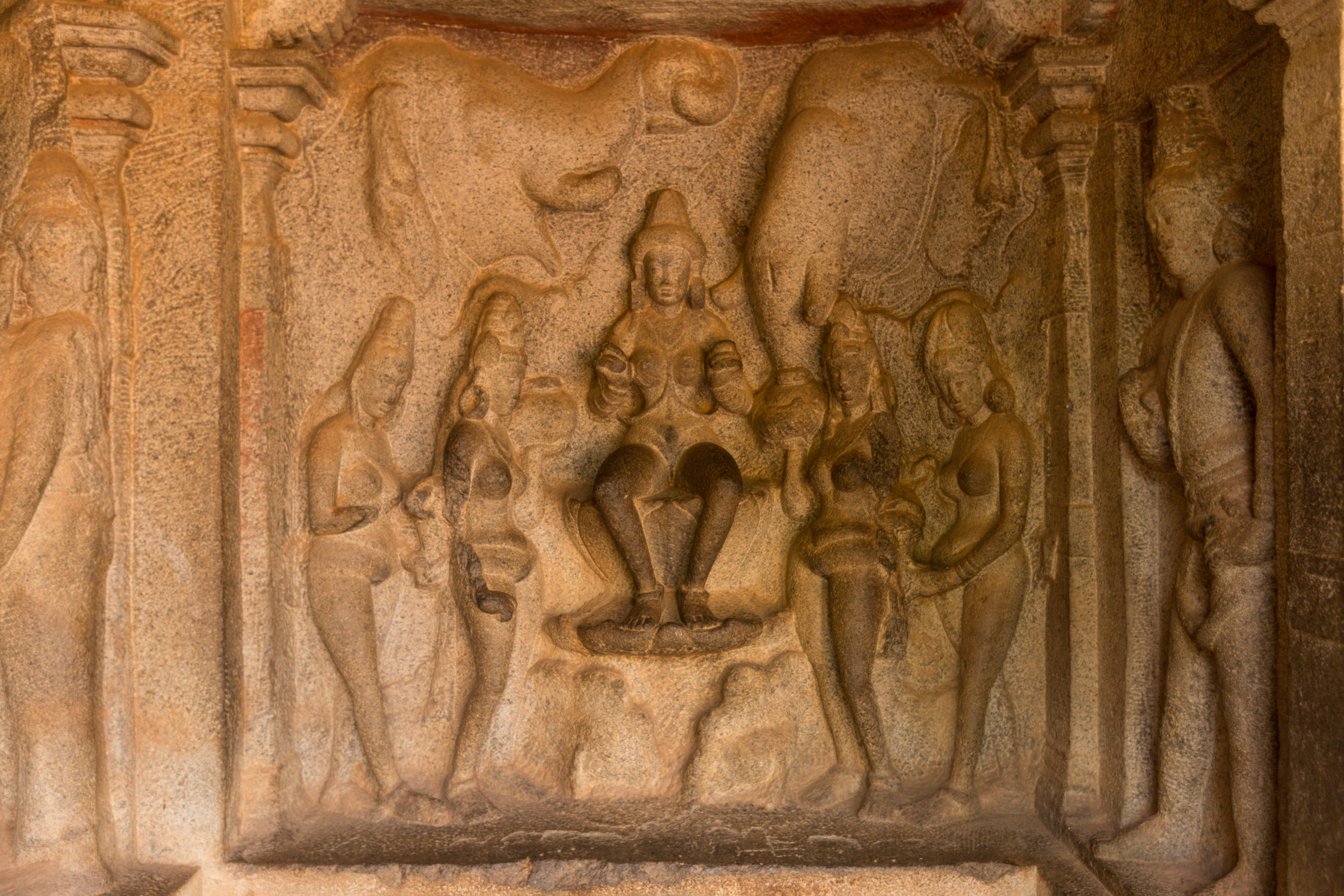
Rock cut of Varaha and Vamana.

Rock cut depicting Durga fighting Mahishasura.

Narasimhavarman was a skilled dramatist and poet. He wrote many works in Sanskrit. Most of these are missing. His Sanskrit plays had themes from Ramayana, the Mahabharatha and the Puranas. Kutiyattam, which is considered as the most ancient available form of dance drama and is still in vogue in Kerala, uses some of his plays (like Kailasodharanam) for subject matter and so does Chakyar koothu, another ancient Tamil dramatized worship service. Another play titled Kamsavadham dealing with the Lord Krishna's slaying of Kamsa also was written by him.

The Sanskrit litterateur Dandin spent several years in his court and was patronized by the monarch, but we do not know about his standing as the inscriptions denote considerable level of erudition. Narasimhavarman himself was a great devotee who was credited for having mastered the great agamic worship rituals like his preceptor Drona.

Narasimhavarman II is mainly remembered as a devotee of the Hindu God Shiva and a relentless warrior king who made sure that the Pallava power remained dominant in the subcontinent. Shiva is said to have appeared in the monarch's dream and ordered him to delay his coronation as he wanted to first bless an impoverished saint in Pusalar. This account is mentioned in many Pallava grants of Narasimhavarman as well as those of his successors.

== Religious endowments ==
In the Kasakudi plates of Nandivarman Pallavamalla, Narasimhavarman II is said to have bestowed his wealth on temples and Brahmanas. He was devout worshiper of Shiva, Vishnu and Subramanya as per his Reyuru grant. All of the temples he commissioned are dedicated to Shiva which suggests that he was more inclined to Shiva worship. He commissioned the Kailasanathar Temple Complex in the Pallava capital of Kanchipuram. The main shrine is titled "Rajasimhesvara". The complex also houses a smaller shrine commissioned by his pious Maharani Rangapataka and a frontal shrine named "Mahendresvara" which was commissioned by his son Mahendravarman III. Narasimhavarman II is generally identified with as Kalarsinga Nayanar (meaning "one who is lion to crowd of evil kings"), one of the 63 Nayanars and also a contemporary to many Nayanar saints like Sundarar, Dandi Adigal Nayanar, Pusalar.

== Patronage of architecture ==
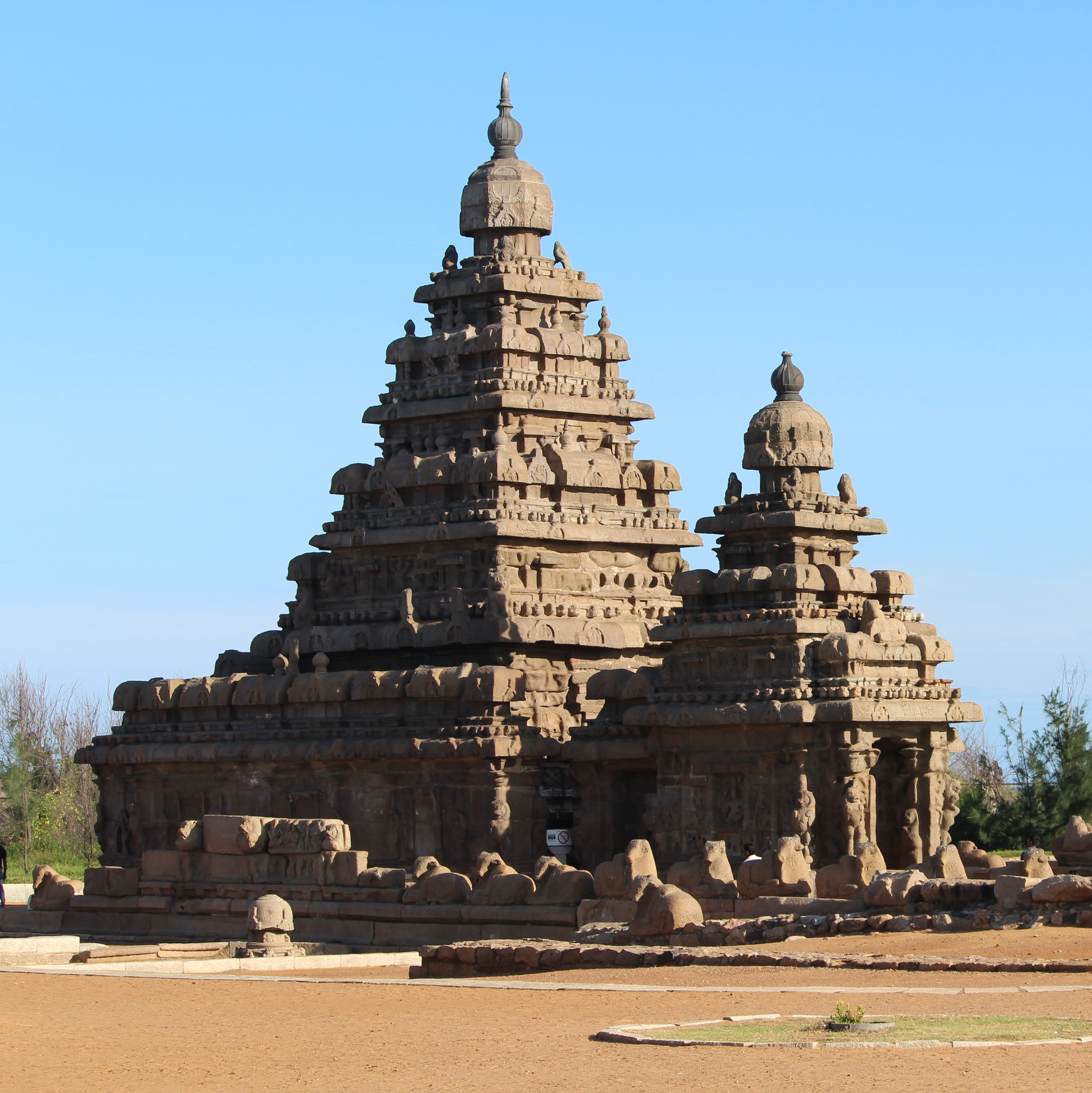
The Shore Temple at Mahabalipuram built by Narasimhavarman II

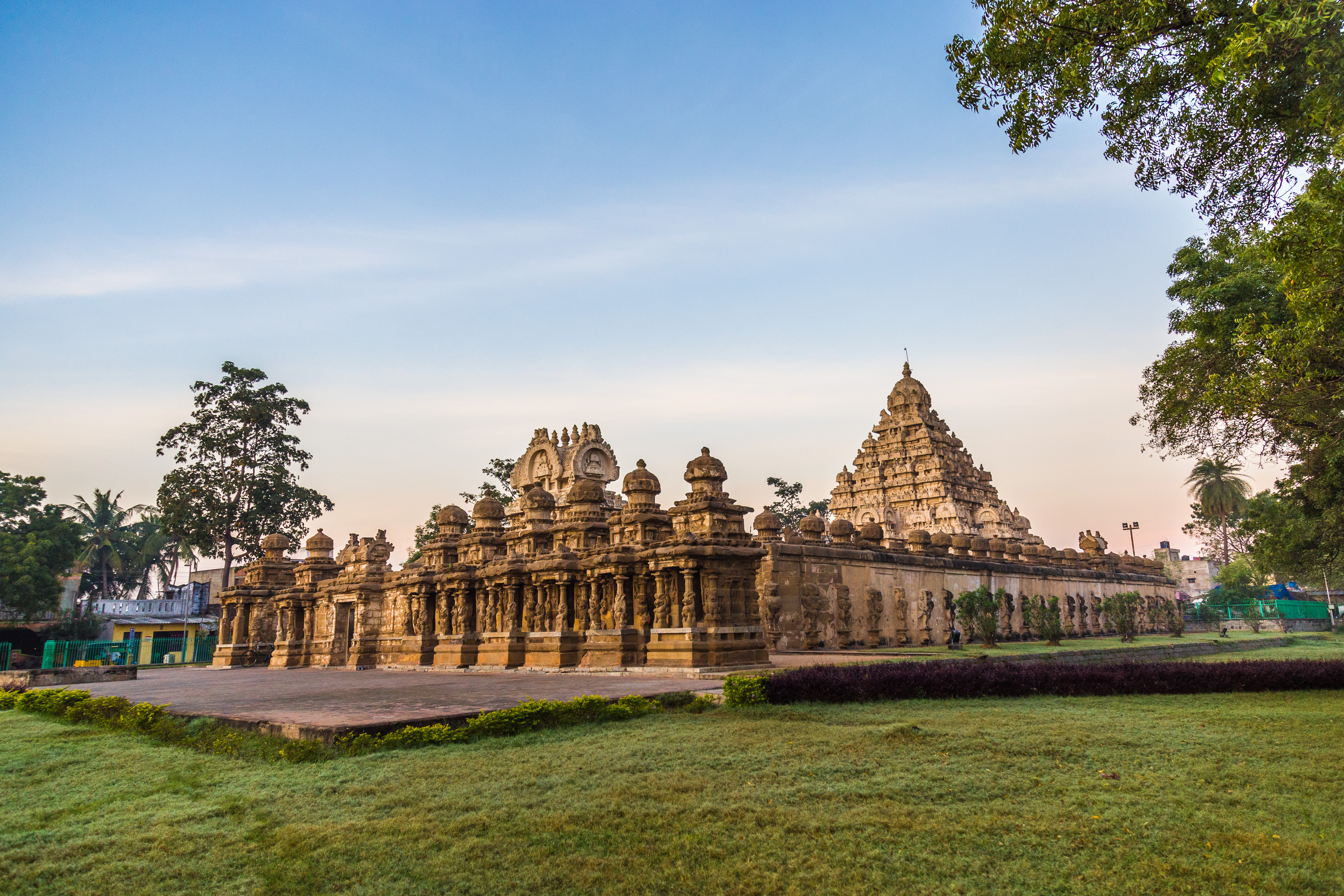
Kailasanathar temple built in Kanchipuram.

Narasimhavarman's reign was marked by peace and prosperity, and he constructed several beautiful temples. Apart from the Kailasanathar Temple at Kanchipuram, Narasimhavarman II also built several other temples, including the Shore Temple at Mahabalipuram. He is also credited with building the Iravatanesvara Temple at Kanchipuram and the Talagirisvara Temple at Panamalai.

== Successor ==
Narasimhavarman's had two sons – Mahendravarman III and Paramesvaravarman II. However, Mahendravarman III predeceased his father, and Paramesvaravarman II succeeded to the throne.

== Footnotes ==
Narasimhavarman II Pallava dynasty
Preceded by Paramesvaravarman I	Pallava dynasty 695–722	Succeeded by Paramesvaravarman II
