= Bali pitha =

Sacrificial altar of a Hindu temple

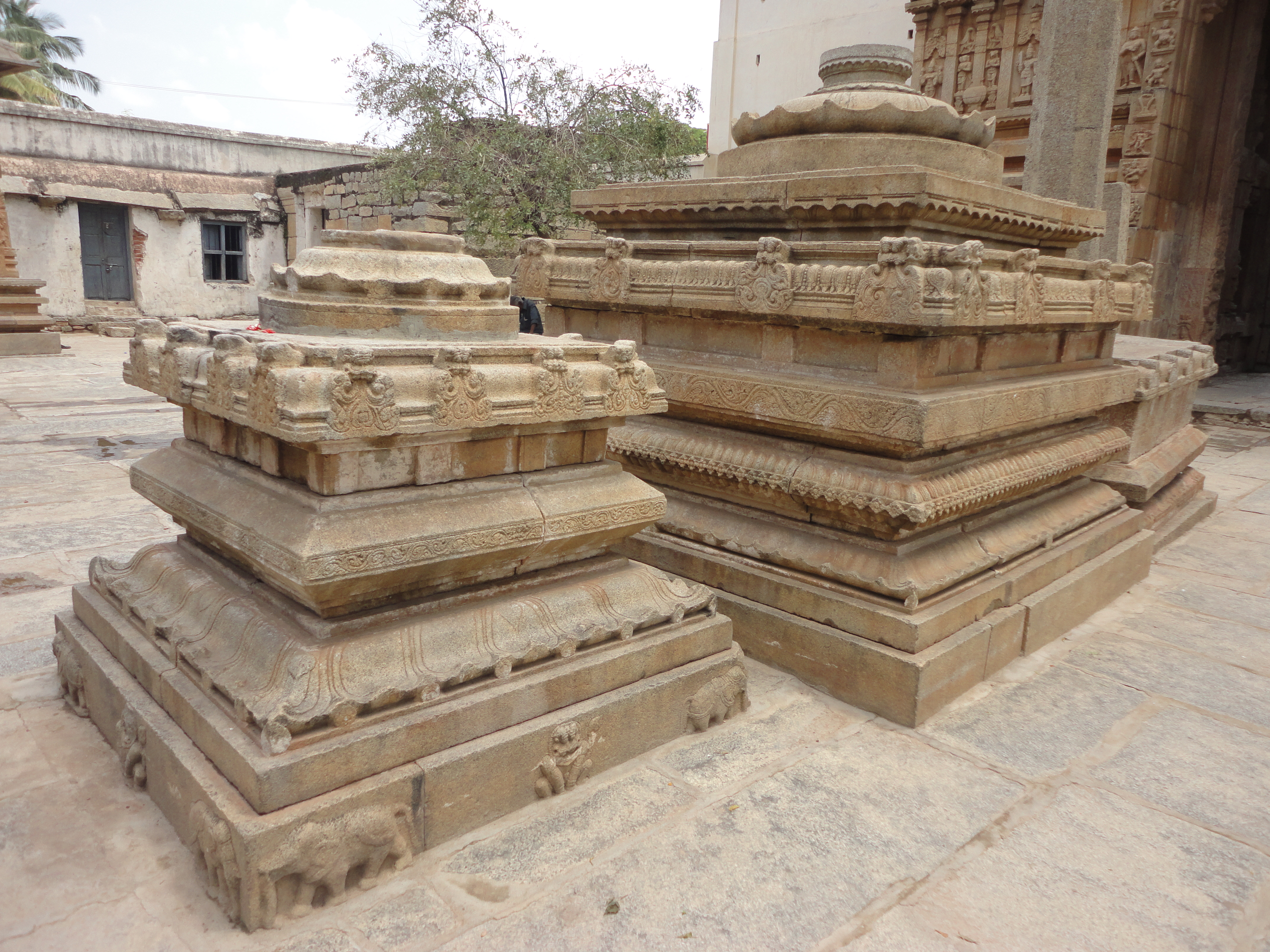
The bali pithas of the Someshwara Temple, Kolar

A bali pitha (Sanskrit: बलिपीठम्, romanized: balipīṭham) is the sacrificial altar of a Hindu temple. It is generally built in the shape of a blossoming lotus, erected near the main entrance of a temple. Offerings of riceballs, referred to as pinda, are usually made by adherents upon a bali pitha.

== Etymology ==
Bali pitha is a Sanskrit compound word: bali refers to the ritual offering made to propitiate a given deity, whereas pīṭham means seat.

== Description ==
After the emergence of Puranic Hinduism, the size of Hindu temples expanded to include the bali pitha, accompanied by a dhvajastambha (flagstaff) located at the porch. A bali pitha is commonly constructed with a lotiform altar placed upon a stone platform. The lotiform altar is also made of stone. It comprises a square base upon which a structure resembling an inverted cup with lotus markings stands, bearing eight petals that widen towards the base, along with a flattened round top. The bali pithas of temples that adhere to Brahmanical traditions conventionally receive offerings of rice and flowers from adherents, whereas those of temples that hold festivals that involve animal sacrifices receive the heads of animals such as goats.

=== Symbolism ===
A bali pitha is conceived as a metaphorical seat where a given deity resides, and is sometimes imprinted by the footprints of a given deity. Sindura (vermillion powder) is placed upon the structure during the performance of rituals, representing the ceremonial feeding of attendant deities. The altar is also regarded to symbolise the sacrifice of an adherent's ego and desires before their entrance within the temple.
