= Simhavishnu =

Pallava emperor (c. 575 – 600 CE)

- Avanisimha
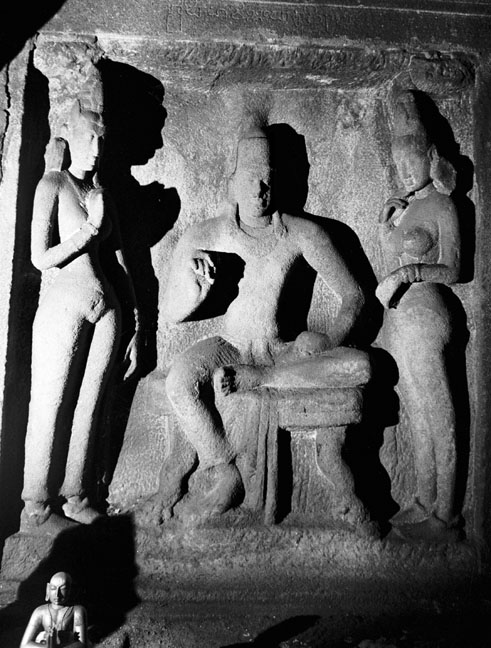
- Simhavishnu with his queens: sculpture found in Adivaraha mandapam in Mahabalipuram. This is dated to the reign of his grandson, Narasimhavarman I (630–668).

Pallava emperor
- Reign: c. 575 – 600 CE (disputed)
- Predecessor: Simhavarman III
- Successor: Mahendravarman I
- Spouse: Daughter of Vikramendra Varma II
- Issue: Mahendravarman I
- Dynasty: Pallava
- Father: Simhavarman III

Simhavishnu (IAST: Siṃhaviṣṇu), also known as Avanisimha, son of Simhavarman III, was a king of the Pallava dynasty responsible for its revival. He was the first Pallava monarch whose domain extended beyond Kanchipuram (Kanchi) to the south. He is portrayed as a great conqueror in Mattavilasa Prahasana, a drama written by his son Mahendravarman I.

== Reign ==
There is no exact academic consensus regarding the period of Simhavishnu's reign. Different scholars propose the following timelines:

- K. A. Nilakanta Sastri: 555–590 CE
- Sailendra Nath Sen: 575–600 CE
- T. V. Mahalingam: 575–615 CE

Based on available Hero stones, he ruled for at least 33 years.

== Expansion of kingdom ==
When Simhavishnu ascended the throne, the Pallava dynasty was beginning to reassert its supremacy. At that time, the southern peninsula of India was ruled by five dynasties: the Pallavas, Cholas, and Pandyas in Tamil Nadu and Andhra Pradesh; the Cheras in Kerala; and the Chalukyas in Karnataka.

Simhavishnu overthrew the Kalabhras and conquered the region up to the Kaveri River, where he came into conflict with the Pandyas and Ceylon. He is also credited with establishing Kanchipuram as a powerful capital. The presence of Pallava influence in Southeast Asia—attested by art and Grantha script inscriptions in countries like Thailand, Laos, and Cambodia—is often traced back to the maritime foundations laid during this period.

The struggle between the Pallavas and the Chalukyas, which would last for more than two centuries, began during his reign.

== Contribution to literature ==
Simhavishnu was a patron of the Sanskrit poet Bharavi, author of the epic Kiratarjuniya, which depicts the duel between Shiva and Arjuna. The structure of the work suggests it was intended for Koodiyattam performances during temple festivals, a tradition that continues to this day.

== Religious affiliation ==
Simhavishnu was a follower of Vaishnavism, as evidenced by the Udayendiram copper plates of Nandivarman II. This is significant as his son, Mahendravarman I, was initially a follower of Jainism before converting to Shaivism.

A portrait of Simhavishnu can be seen in the stone engravings at the Varaha Cave Temple (Adivaraha Mandapam) in Mahabalipuram, a UNESCO World Heritage Site that stands as a testament to Pallava art.

== Notes ==
Simhavishnu Pallava dynasty
Preceded by Simhavarman III	Pallava King c. 575 – 600 CE	Succeeded by Mahendravarman I
