= Vaikunda Perumal Temple =

Vaikunda Perumal Temple may refer to several places:

- Tiru Parameswara Vinnagaram, a temple in Kanchipuram, Tamil Nadu, India
- Vaikunda Perumal Temple, Uthiramerur, a temple in Uthiramerur, Tamil Nadu, India
- Vaikunta Perumal Mangadu, a temple near Mangadu, Tamil Nadu, India
- Srivaikuntanathan Permual Temple, at Srivaikuntam, Tamil Nadu, India
