= Ammaiyappanallor =

- village
- Interactive map of Ammaiyappanallor
- Coordinates: 12.606222°N 79.7048431°E
- Country: India
- State: Tamil Nadu
- District: Kancheepuram

Population (2001)
  - Total: 842

Languages
  - Official: Tamil
- Time zone: UTC+5:30 (IST)

Ammaiyappanallor is a village in Kancheepuram District, Tamil Nadu, India near Uthiramerur. The population was 842 with 240 households as of 2001 Indian census.
