= Sundaravarada Perumal temple =

Perumal temple in Kanchipuram district, Tamil Nadu, India

Sundaravarada Perumal Temple
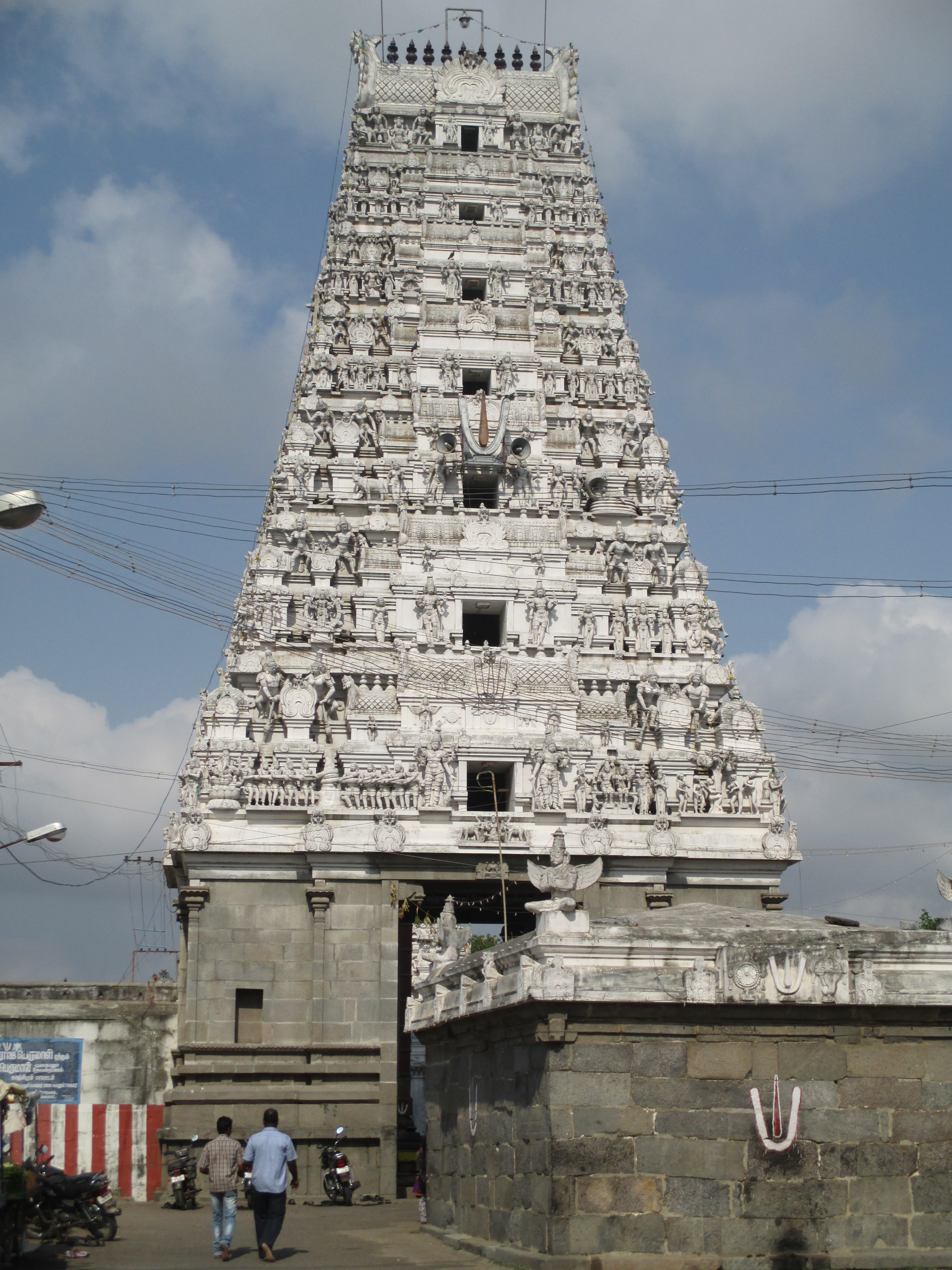

- Location in Tamil Nadu

Religion
- Affiliation: Hinduism
- District: Kanchipuram
- Deity: Sundaravarada Perumal (Vishnu) Anandavalli (Lakshmi)

Location
- Location: Uthiramerur
- State: Tamil Nadu
- Country: India
- Interactive map of Sundaravarada Perumal Temple
- Coordinates: 12°36′53″N 79°45′18″E

Architecture
- Type: Dravidian architecture

The Sundaravarada Perumal Temple in Uthiramerur, a village in the South Indian state of Tamil Nadu, is dedicated to the Hindu god Vishnu. Constructed in the Dravidian style of architecture, the temple. Vishnu is worshipped as Sundaravarada Perumal and his consort Lakshmi as Anandavalli. The temple was originally built by Pallavas, with later additions from the Cholas, Pandyas, Sambuvarayas, Vijayanagara Rayas and the Nayaks.

A granite wall surrounds the temple, enclosing all its shrines. The temple has a five-tiered rajagopuram, the gateway tower. The temple tank is located adjacent to the temple, outside the main entrance. Unlike other temples, the temple has three sanctums in a two tiered structure and three shrines in three cardinal directions in the lower level.

Sundaravarada Perumal is believed to have appeared for Arjuna, Nakula and Sahadeva, the Pandava princes in Mahabharata, while Anandavalli for their wife Draupadi. The temple follows Vadakalai tradition of worship. Six daily rituals and many yearly festivals are held at the temple, of which the Brahmotsavam during the Tamil month of Chittirai (April - May), Pavitrotsava during Adi (July - August) and Sri Jayanti in Avani (August - September) being the most prominent. The temple is maintained and administered by the Hindu Religious and Endowment Board of the Government of Tamil Nadu.

== Legend ==
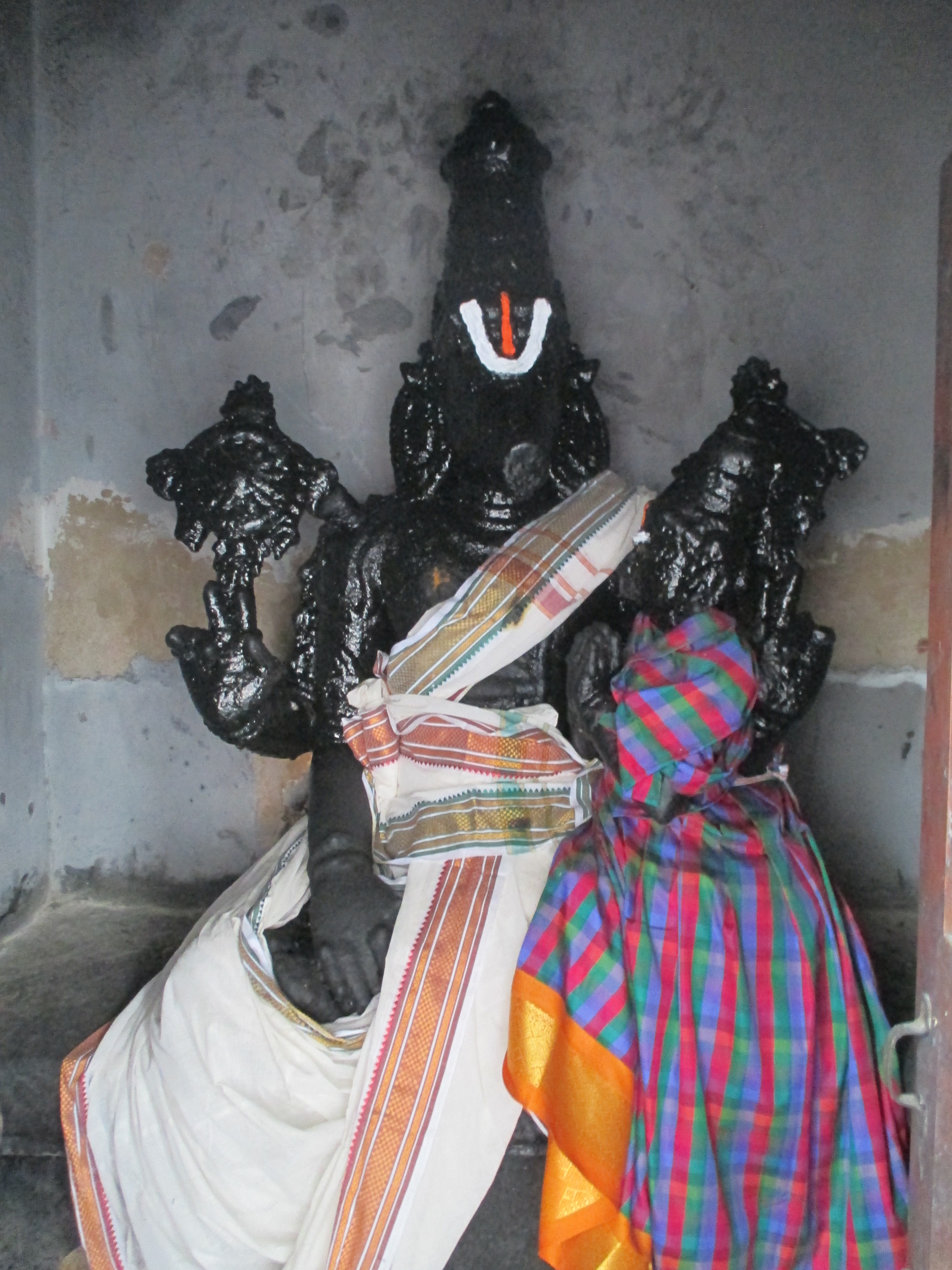
Varaha Perumal

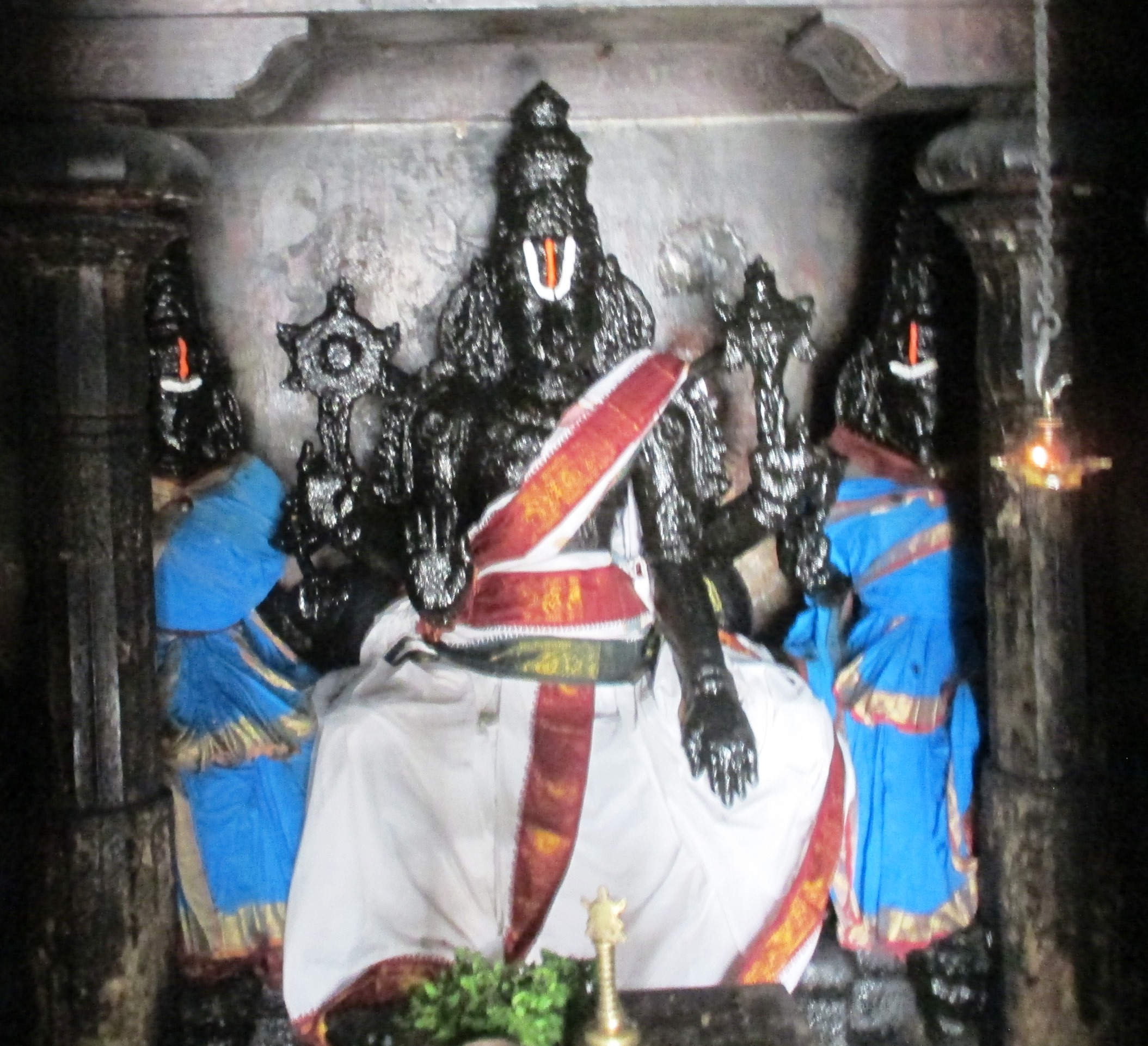
Vaikunta Perumal

As per Hindu legend, Sundara Varada Perumal temple is closely associated with Mahabharata, an epic. Bhima, the Pandava prince in Mahabharata worshipped Vishnu at this place. There are three Varadas around the main sanctum in the ground floor namely Achyuta Varada, Anirudhha Varada and Kalyana Varada, who are believed to have given relief to Arjuna, Nakula and Sahadeva, the other three Pandava princes. The consort presiding deity, Anandavalli is believed to have appeared for Draupadi, the wife of the Pandavas. The images of the three Varadas are located around the sanctum in cardinal directions. A flight of steps lead to each of them. The temple was originally called Vellai Vishnugraham (place for the fair deity) and the presiding deity was called Vellaimurthi Embiran, Vellaimurthy Alvar, Rajendra Chola Vinnagar Alvar and Sokka Perumal.

== History ==
Uthiramerur was ruled by the Pallavas, Cholas, Pandyas, Sambuvarayas, Vijayanagara Rayas, and Nayaks. As per the inscriptions in the temple, the Pallava king Nandivarman II (720–796 CE) established the village around 750 CE. It is believed that he donated the village to Vedic Brahmins from Srivaishanva community. There is a mention about four Pallava kings up to 900 CE. There are a total of 25 inscriptions from the Pallava period. The temple was built by Nandivarman II modeled from the Vaikuntantha Perumal temple in Kanchipuram. From the inscriptions, it is also learnt that the temple was built according to Agamic principles by the architect Takshaka of Pataka and with expert consultation with the Agamic tradition in the village.

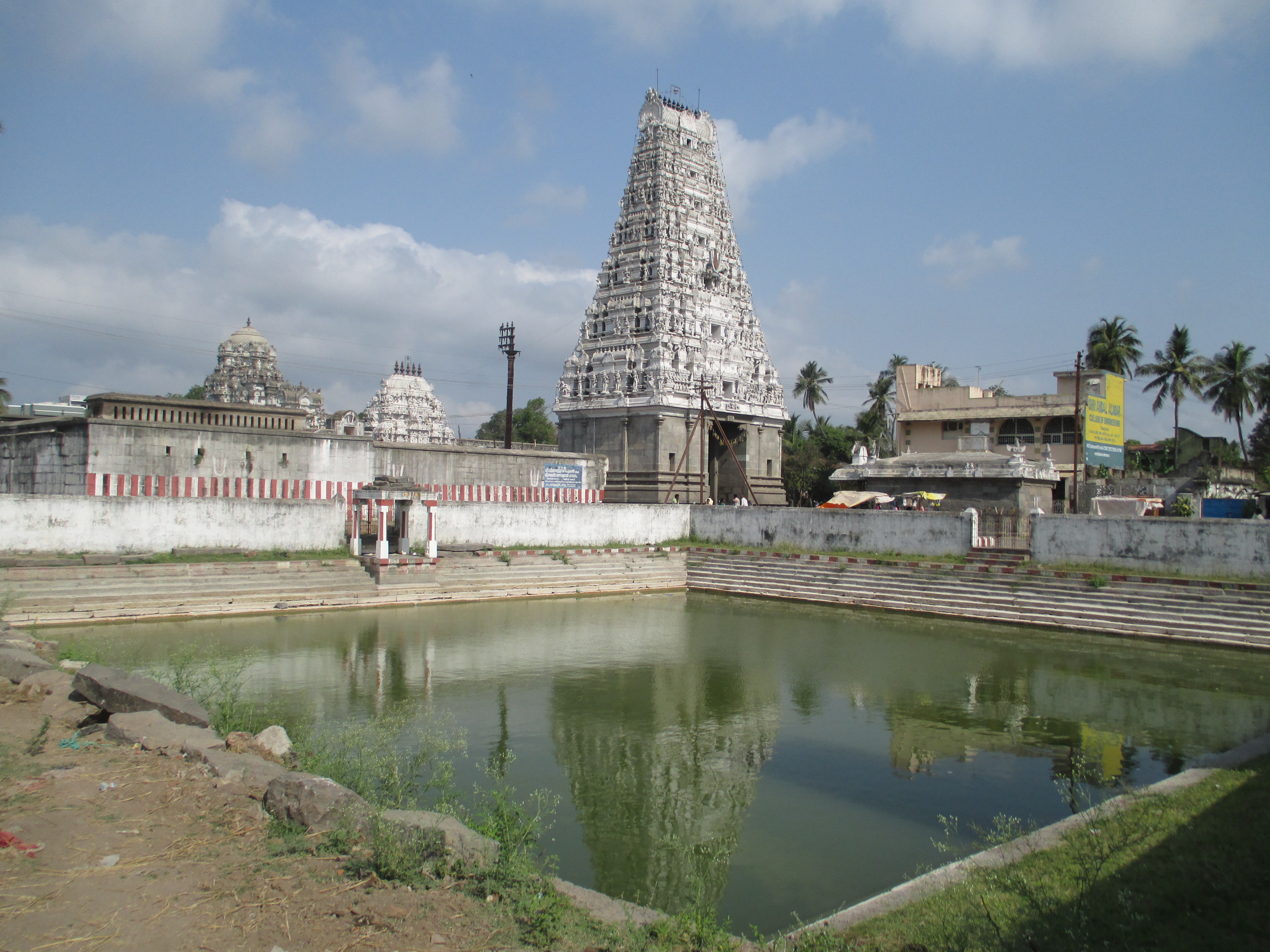
Image of the temple tank

The Cholas captured the region and it came under their dominion during the later part of 9th century. There are inscriptions from the period of Parantaka Chola I (907–950), Rajaraja Chola I (985–1014), Rajendra Chola I (1012–1044) and Kulothunga Chola I (1070–1120) indicating various gifts to the temples. The process of democratically electing the local representatives through a system called Kudavolai during the Chola regime is documented in the inscriptions.

The region and the village went under the sway of Pandyas during the 13th century and subsequently to the Chalukya Chola ruler Vijaya Gandagopala. He renamed the village of Gandagopala Chaturvedhi Managalam. During the later period, the village switched hands to Pallava chieftains, Chalukya Cholas, Samburavarayars and Kumara Kampana of The Vijayanagara emperor and Krishnadevaraya (1502–29) and Nayak kings made contributions to the Sundaravarada temple, Subhramanya temple and Kailasanatha temple in the village. The village was the scene of war between Lingma and Yachama during the 17th century. The Carnatic Wars were fought in the nearby Vandavasi between the British and the French during the 18th century. The temple is maintained and administered by the Hindu Religious and Endowment Board of the Government of Tamil Nadu. Based on the inscriptions, the temple has been addressed by many names, like Vellai Vishnugraham, Vellai Murthi Emperan, Vellaimurthi Alvar, Rajendra Chola Vinnagar Alvar and Sokka Perumal.

== Architecture ==
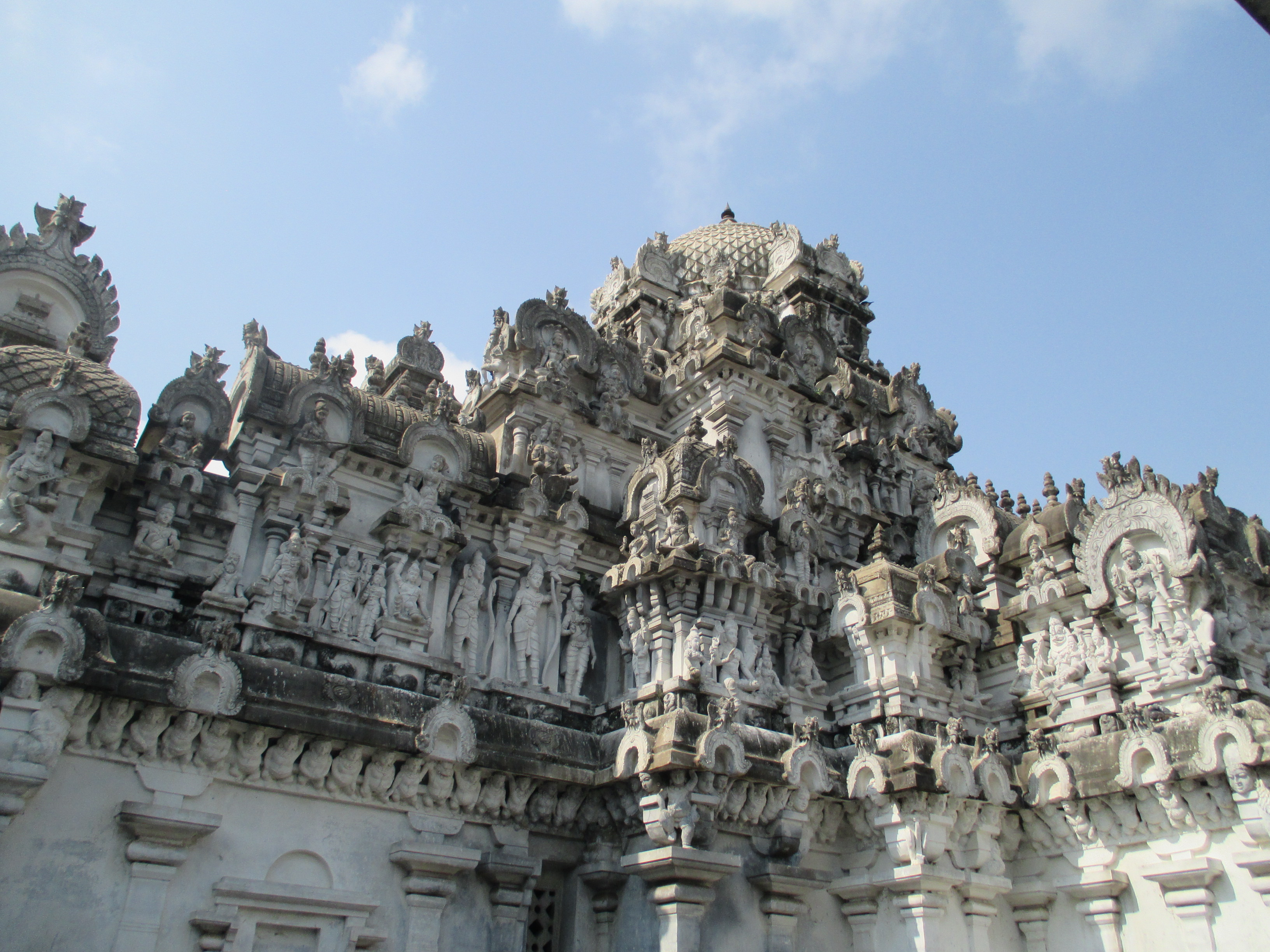
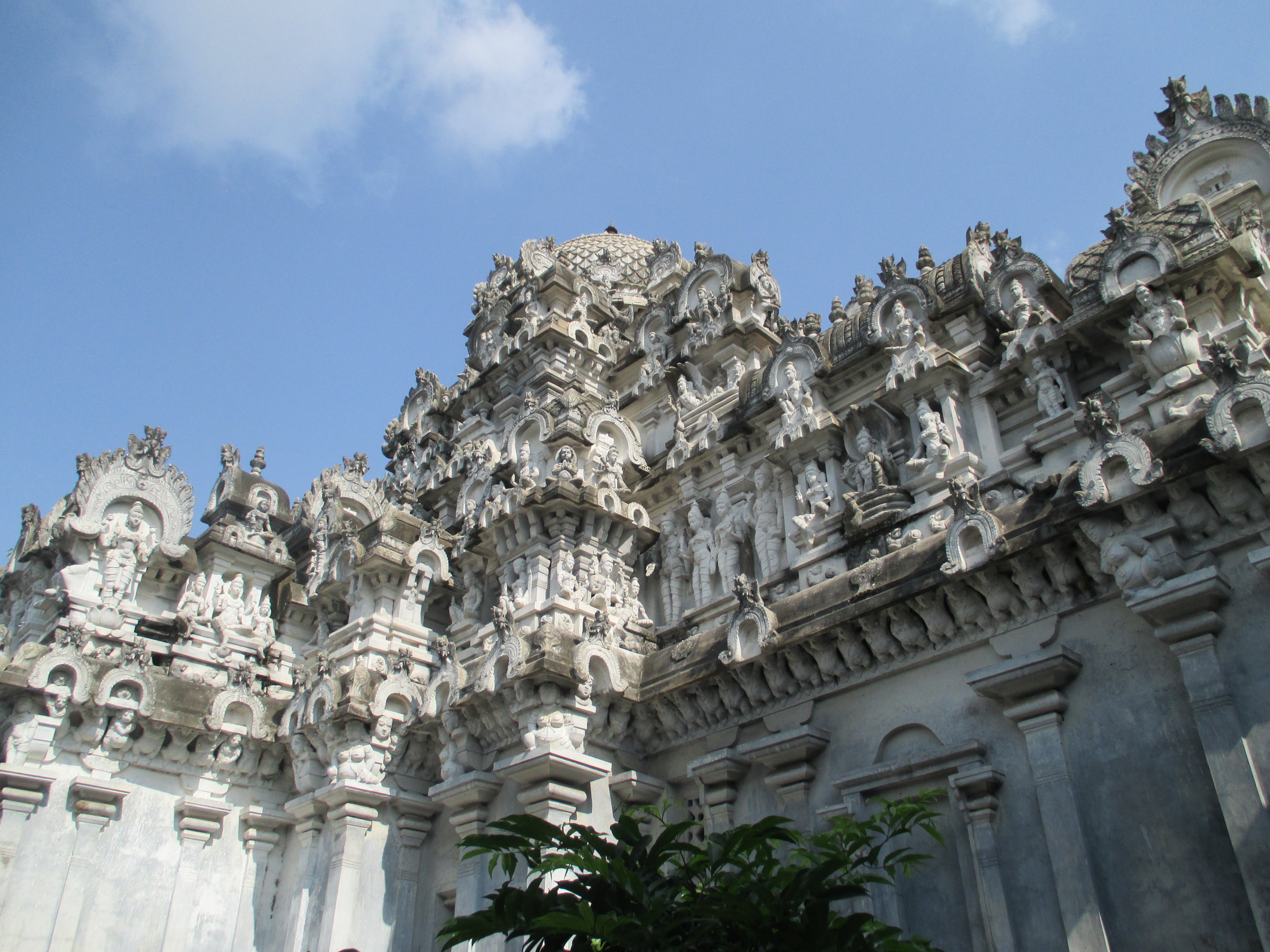
The stucco images in the vimana

Sundaravarada Perumal temple covers an area of about 2 acres (0.81 hectares) and has a five-tiered gopuram (gateway tower). The temple in enclosed in a rectangular enclosure with huge granite walls. Unlike other South Indian temples where there in only one sanctum housing the presiding deity, Sundaravarada temple has a two storied sanctum and three shrines in cardinal directions around the sanctum.

The sanctum at the lower level houses the image of Chaturbhujanga Vishnu sported with four arms. Two of his hands hold the conch and chakra, while the third is depicted with Abhaya hasta (guarding sign) and the fourth with kati hasta (resting on thigh). The image is depicted in standing posture and commonly called as the Sundaravarada Perumal. The sanctum also houses the images of Sridevi and Bhudevi on either sides of Sundaravarada. The festival image of Sundaravarada is also housed in the same sanctum. The walls around the sanctum have panels in each direction that house the images of Achyutha Varada (facing South), Anirudda Varadha (facing West) and Kalyana Varada (facing North), who are believed to have offered relief to Arjuna, Nakula and Sahadeva. The first tier is approached by a flight of steps on either side, usually one is used for ascending and other for descent. The sanctum first tier houses the image of Vaikuntavarada in seated posture with Sridevi and Bhudevi on either of his sides. The sanctum is made of wood and has a narrow precinct around the sanctum. There are shrines of Arjuna, Krishna and Yoga Narasimha around the sanctum. Another set of steps leads to the top floor leading to the sanctum of Ananda Padmanabha in reclining posture in his serpent bed of Adisesha. The images of Bhudevi and sage Markendeya are seen in the sanctum. The roof of the sanctum is called Padma Kosthta Ashtanga Vimana, which has sculptural depiction of the nine different forms of Vishnu.

The shrine of the consort of Sundaravarada Perumal, Anandavalli, is located to the south of the main shrine in the lower level. There are smaller shrines of Lakshmi Narasimha, Rama, Andal, Narasimha and Vedanta Desika are found in separate shrines around the first precinct. The temple tank, called Vairamegha tataka, located to the west of the temple, is mentioned in a lot of inscriptions.

The Sundaravarada Perumal temple is said to have been constructed by the mason Paramesa Vathan, who was extremely skilled in Vastu shastra. The main deity in this temple is Lord Sundara Varada Perumal. This temple has numerous inscriptions — those of the great Raja Raja Chola (985-1015 A.D.), his able son, Rajendra Chola and the Vijayanagar emperor Krishnadevaraya. Both Rajendra Chola and Krishnadeva Raya visited Uthiramerur. The rituals in this temple are performed as per Vikhanasa Aagama following the Krishna Yajurveda. This temple's gopuram is seen to have rebuilt in 1998. The rebuilt Galigopuram showcases the rich sculptures of some of the Hindu gods (mostly the reincarnations of Vishnu). It showcases Kshira Sagara Madhanam, Sri Vikhanasa Acharya with his four disciples (Bhrigu, Marichi, Atri, Kashyapa), Andal, Sudarshana, Rama, and many other sculptures resembling vikhanasa sutra. Another special thing about this temple is that there will be 9 Mula Virats (main deities) under the same vimanam. Four Perumal vigrahas facing in four different directions around mula virat along with four more Perumal statues one stair up.

== Religious practices and festival ==
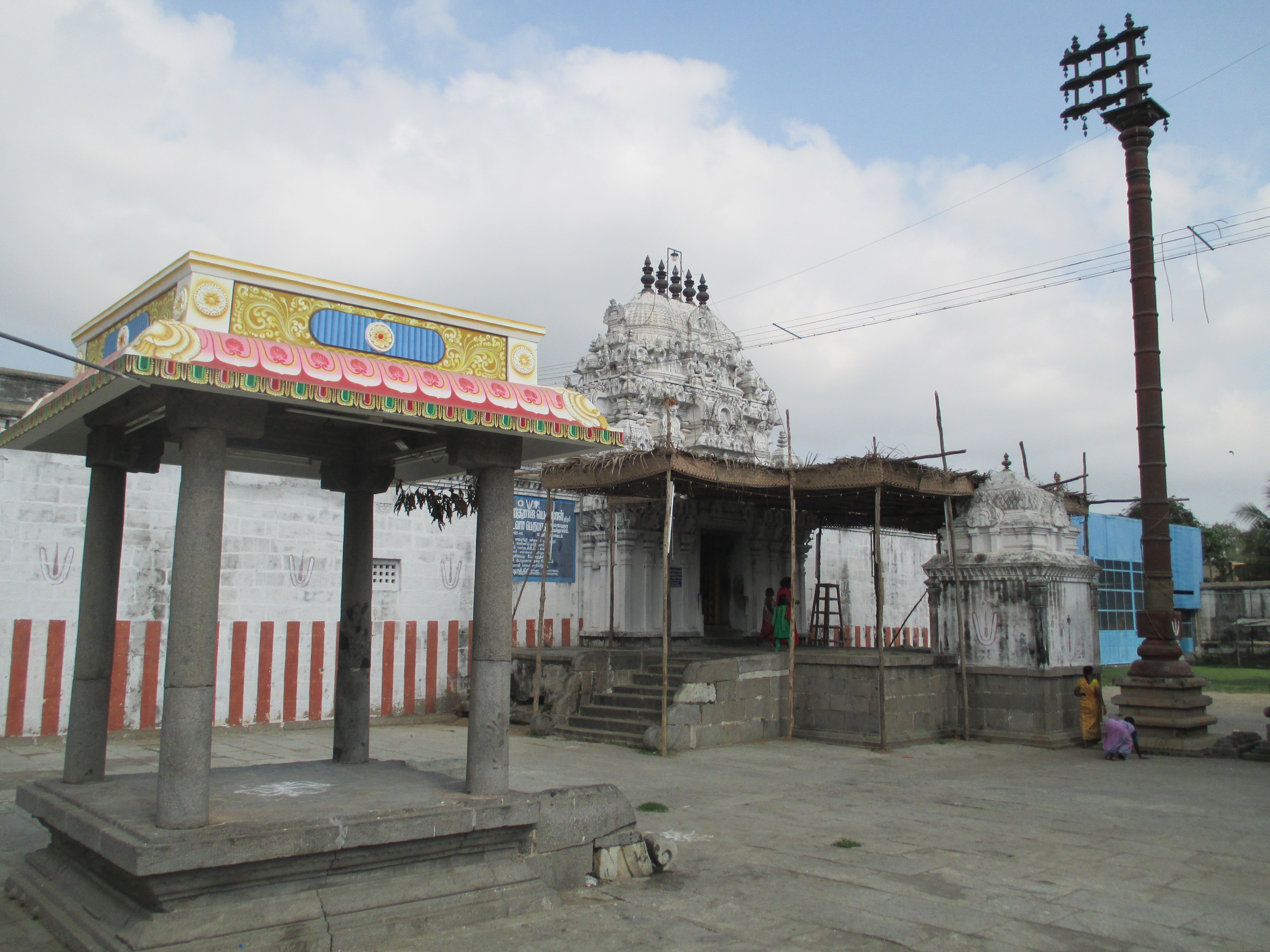
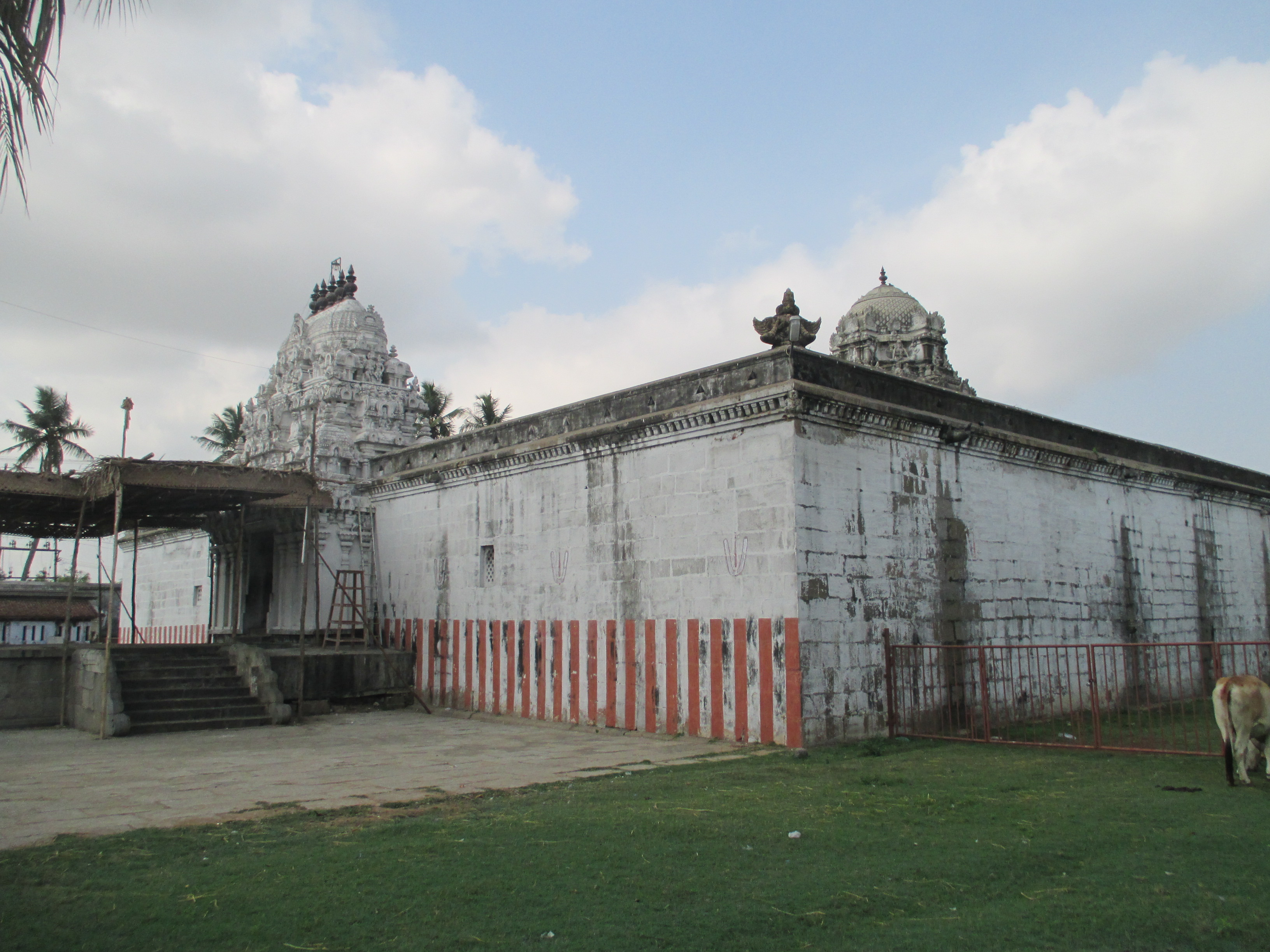
The entrance and shrines of the temple

The temple follows the traditions of the Vadakalai sect of Vaishnavite tradition and follows Vaikasana aagama. In modern times, the temple priests perform the pooja (rituals) during festivals and on a daily basis. As at other Vishnu temples of Tamil Nadu, the priests belong to the Vaishnavaite community, a Brahmin sub-caste. Four daily rituals are held at various times of the day and many yearly festivals are held at the temple, of which the Brahmotsavam during the Tamil month of Chittirai (April - May), Pavitrotsava during Adi (July - August) and Sri Jayanti in Avani (August - September) being the most prominent. There are weekly, monthly and fortnightly rituals performed in the temple.
