= Tiru Parameswara Vinnagaram =

Perumal temple in Kanchipuram district, Tamil Nadu, India

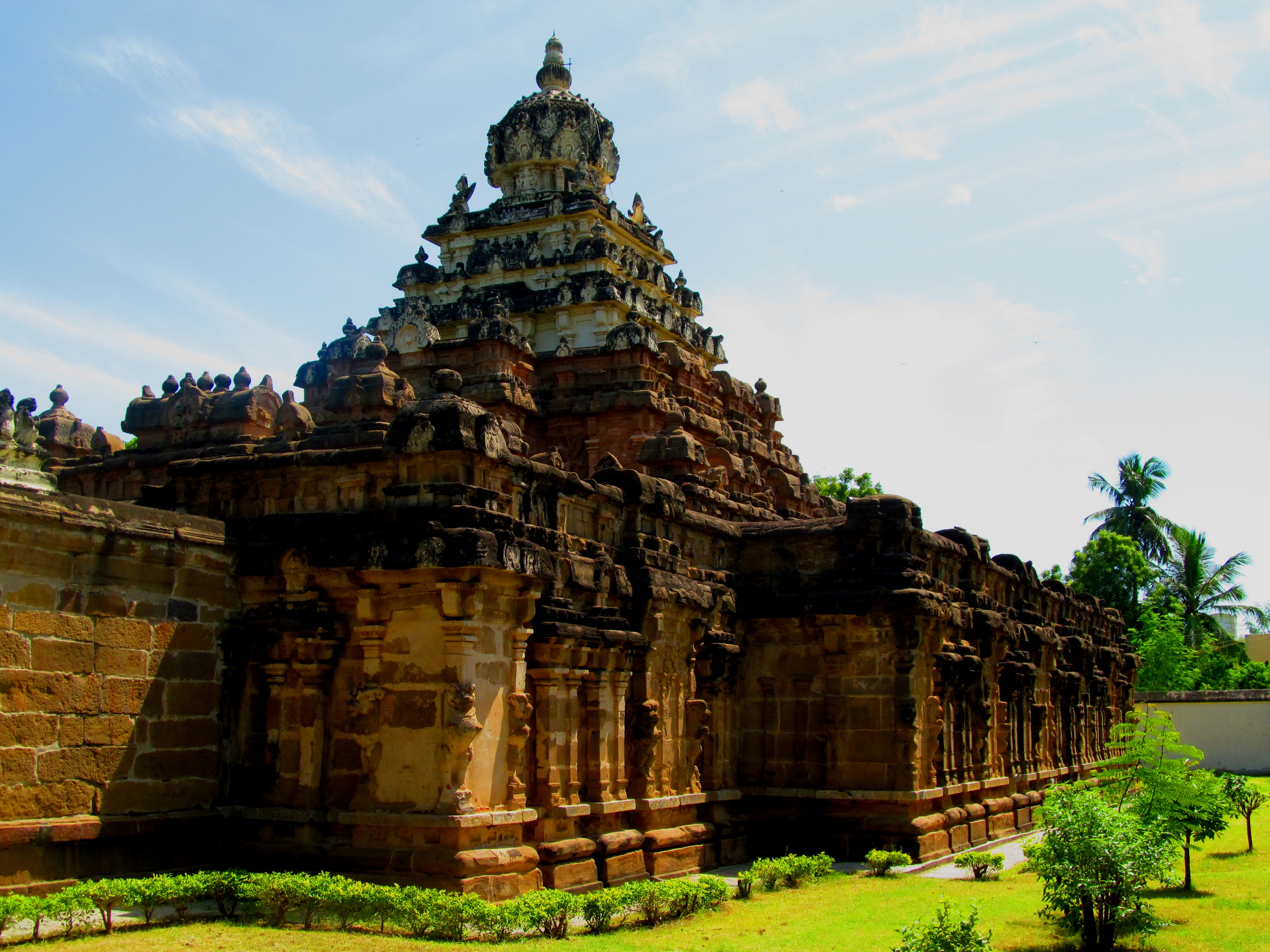

- Location in Tamil Nadu

Religion
- Affiliation: Hinduism
- District: Kanchipuram
- Deity: Vaikunta Perumal (Vishnu) Vaikunthavalli Thayar

Location
- State: Tamil Nadu
- Country: India
- Coordinates: 12°50′13″N 79°42′36″E

Architecture
- Type: Dravidian architecture
- Creator: Pallava
- Inscriptions: Tamil

Tiru Parameswara Vinnagaram also known today as the Vaikunta Perumal Temple is a Hindu temple dedicated to the deity Vishnu (or Krishna), located in the ancient Pallava capital city of Kanchipuram in the present-day South Indian state of Tamil Nadu. Built by the emperor Nandivarman II Pallavamalla, the 8th century stone temple was originally known as Paramechuravinnagaram in Tamil and Vishnugriha in Sanskrit, meaning "Vishnu-house", signifying a royal palace for Parameshvara, an epithet of the deity.

Study of the Vaikunta Perumal Temple has contributed to dating portions of the Bhagavata Purana, one of the eighteen major Puranas and an influential text in Hindu religious tradition. The temple is the subject of a detailed analysis by historian D. Dennis Hudson, whose monograph is dedicated to decoding its iconography and layout as an architectural summa of the Bhagavata Purana.

The temple is one of the prominent tourist attractions in the city.

== Legend ==
According to local tradition, the sage Bharadvaja was doing penance at the site of the unbuilt temple and was attracted by a celestial nymph. The sage married her and they had a son. The sage returned to his penance and the nymph returned to svarga, but the child remained on Earth. Shiva and Vishnu undertook the protection of the child. Vishnu one day took the form of a hunter to give the child to an heirless Pallava king who had been praying for a son; the child would later ascend the throne, construct the temple in honor of Vishnu, and according to legend, also become the temple's namesake: Paramesvaravarman II. Notably, this legend departs from mainstream historical consensus that the temple was built by Nandivarman II).

== History ==
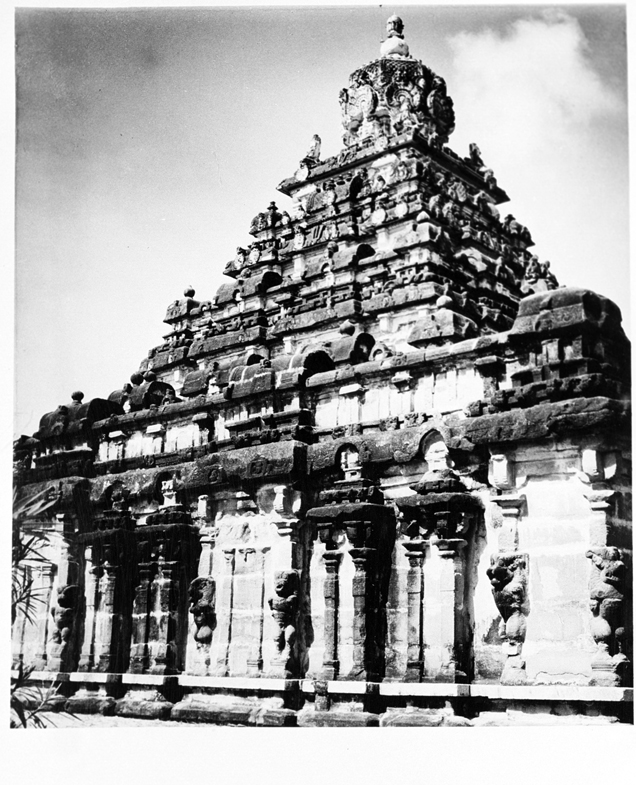
The Tiru Parameswara Vinnagaram in Kanchipuram, photographed in 1956.

According to Hultzh, the Parameswara Vinnagaram was constructed by the Pallava Monarch Nandivarman II in 690 CE, while other scholars place it in the late 8th century. Rhie stylistically dates the temple to approximately 770–775 CE, believing that the temple's construction was a Vaishnava response to the grand Shaiva Kailasanatha Temple built fifty years earlier by Nandivarman II's predecessor, Rajasimha. The great Vaishnava saint Thirumangai Alvar was Nandivarman II's contemporary, and established a chronological anchor for the temple by composing a poem about it, found in the Periya Tirumoli, some time between the temple's completion and the Pallava king's death, likely around 790 CE.

There are various inscriptions in the temple that provide insight into the socio-economic and political situation of the country during the Pallava reign and also confirm the temple's continued royal patronage into the 9th century. Around the sanctum sanctorum in the first precinct, there is an inscription dated to the 8th century which records a golden vessel weighing ten thousand kalanju gifted to the temple by Nandivarman II's son, Dantivarman I in 813 as well as an image made of gold measuring 1,000 sovereigns by King Abhimanasiddhi. There was another gift of 3,000 kalanju of gold to meet daily expenses of the temple. A record of gift of a devotee named Thiruvaranga Manickam to feed devotees of Vishnu is also seen in the temple. The temple is believed to have been constructed few years after the construction of Kanchi Kailasanathar Temple. The bas reliefs in the temple reveal the war between the Pallavas and Gangas and also with Chalukyas.

== Architecture ==
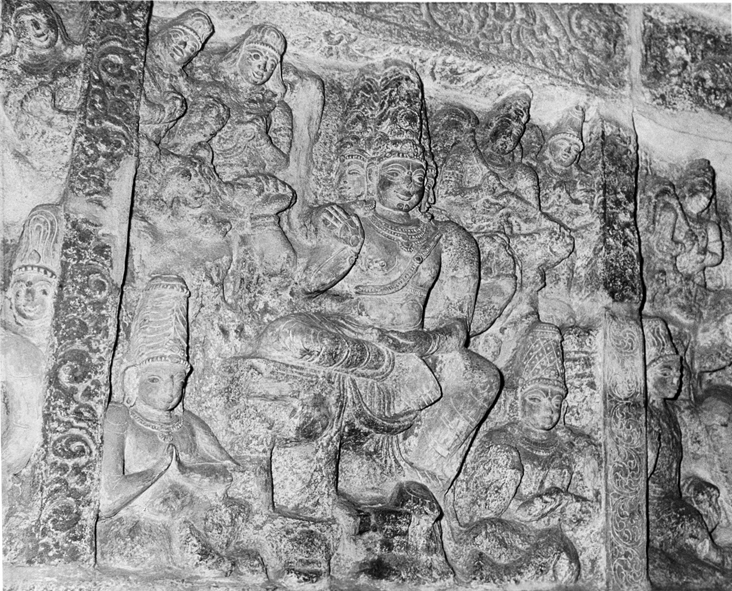
Sculptures on the panel depicting commemoration scenes of outstanding events in the reign of the Pallava king

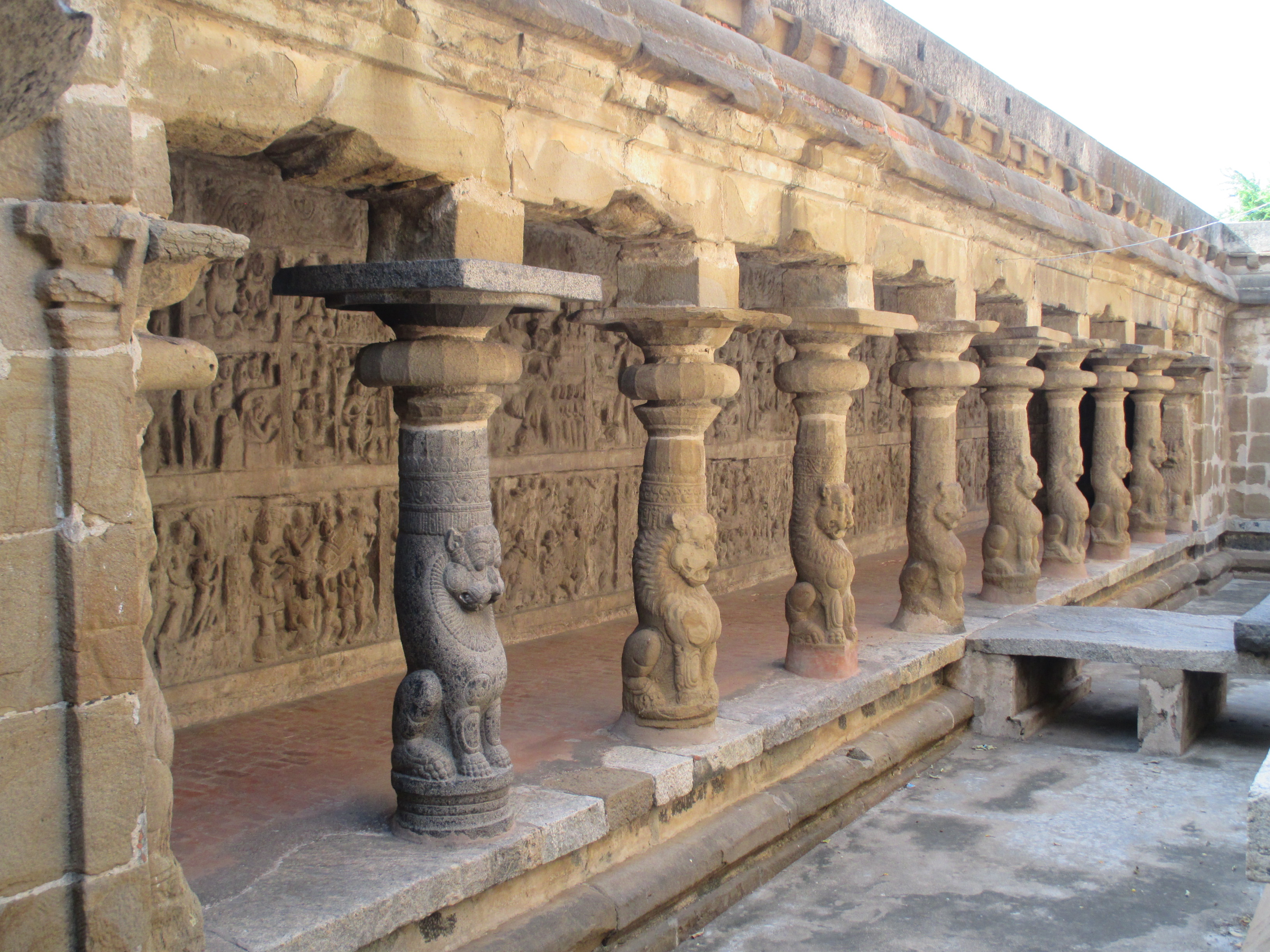
Sculptures on the panel

Paramesvara Vinnagaram is an early example of Dravidian architecture.

The temple takes the form of a three-dimensional chakrabja-mandala (mandala of the lotus and wheel). The vimana has a stepped pyramidal roof. The drainage moat surrounding the base of the vimana was symbolically designed to represent the primordial Kshira Sagara enclosing the celestial mountain of Vaikuntha. Three sanctuaries host the image of Vishnu in different postures - seated (ground floor), lying (first floor; accessible to devotees only on ekadashi days) and standing (second floor; inaccessible to devotees). The logical and complex plan of the temple provided a prototype for the much larger shrines to be constructed all over Tamil Nadu. The external cloisters, with their lion pillars, are predecessors of the grand thousand pillared halls of later temples. In modern times, the four lions have been replaced with Garuda (image of eagle mount of Vishnu).

The cloister walls have a sequence of relief sculptures depicting the history of the Pallava dynasty. The first set of panels show the supposedly divine lineage of the Pallavas starting from Brahma, followed by Angiras (sage), Bṛhaspati, Bharadvaja, Drona and Ashwatthama. These panels are followed by panels depicting the actual Pallava kings themselves. A typical panel shows the king on the left frame of the panel. In some cases, the coronation of the king is shown as can be seen by priests pouring sacred water on his head. The right side of the panel shows battle scenes or other events during that monarch's reign. The panels of Mahendravarman I and Narasimhavarman I show the battles with Pulakesin II of the Badami Chalukyas. Finally, there are panels that show the search and the finding of a successor after Paramesvaravarman II's early death. The successor was found and became Nandivarman II, who built this temple.

The niches on the walls around the sanctum are similar to the ones in Mahabalipuram. Some of the sculptures depict various events from the Mahabaratha, depicting the images of Dharmaraja, Arjuna and Bhima. The temple is built of granite with a mixture of sandstone. The three storied temple is the forerunner for various later built temples like Vaikunta Perumal temple at Uthiramerur, Koodal Azhagar temple at Madurai and Rajagopalaswamy temple at Mannargudi. The three stories are achieved with three concentric squares with a small passage in between with the top layer being closed by a filial.

== Festivals and religious practices ==
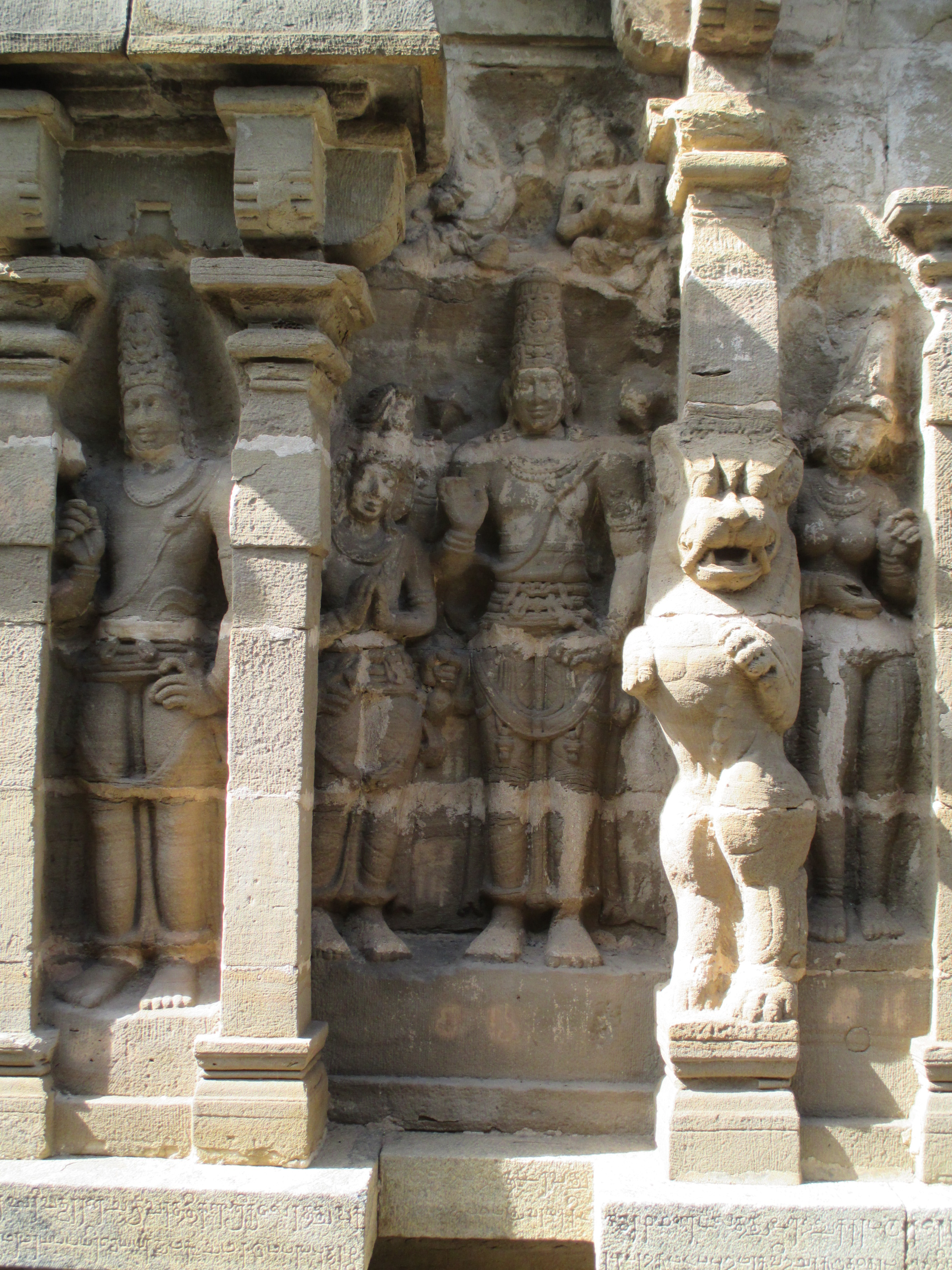
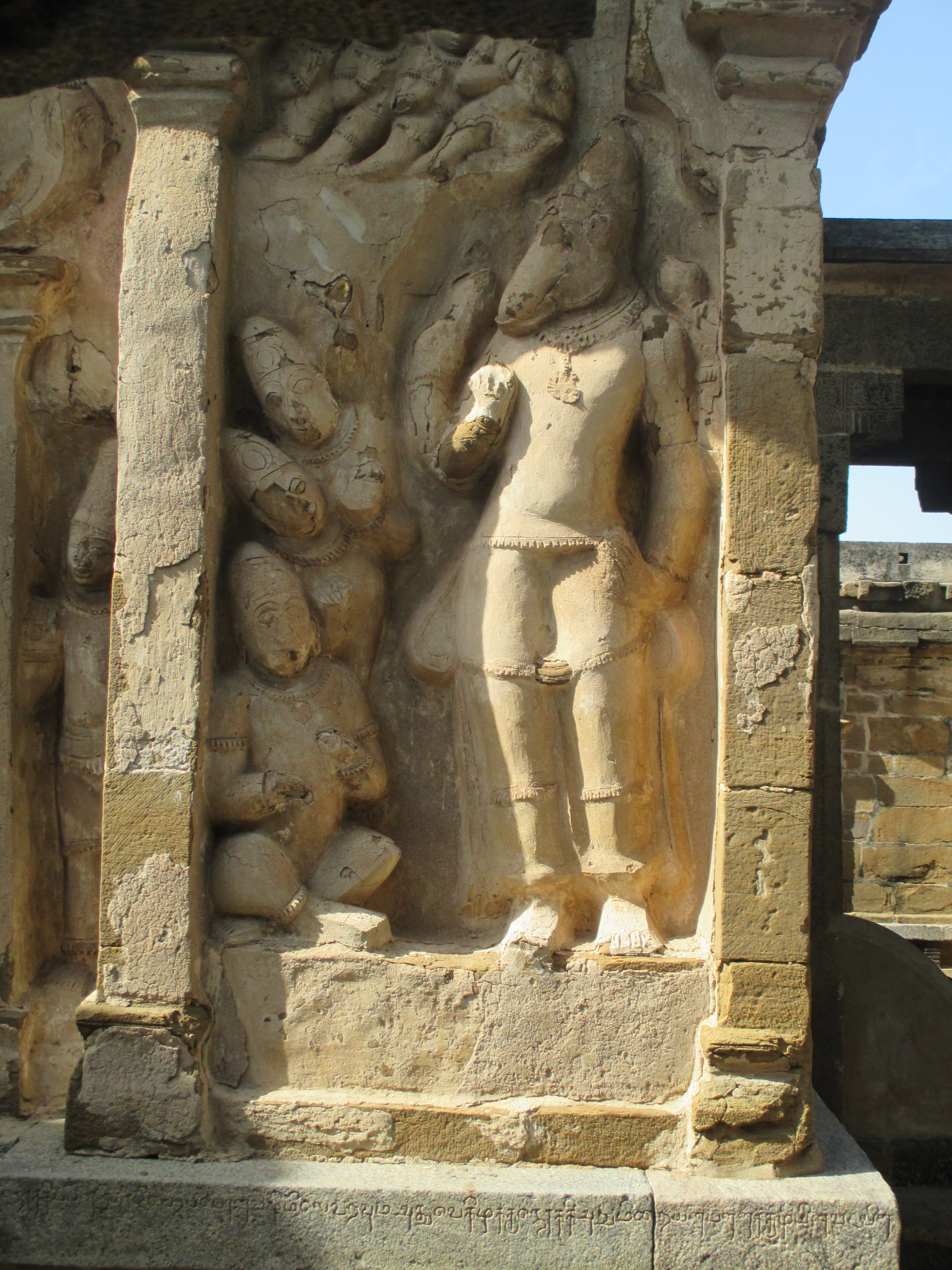
Stucco images of the legend of Narasimha

The temple follows Vaikasana Agama. The temple priests perform the pooja (rituals) during festivals and on a daily basis. Like other Vishnu temples of Tamil Nadu, the priests belong to the Vaishnavaite community, from the Brahmin varna. The temple rituals are performed six times a day: Ushathkalam at 7:30 a.m., Kalasanthi at 8:00 a.m., Uchikalam at 12:00 p.m., Sayarakshai at 5:00 p.m., Irandamkalam at 6:00 p.m. and Ardha Jamam at 7:30 p.m. Each ritual has three steps: alangaram (decoration), neivethanam (food offering) and deepa aradanai (waving of lamps) for both Vaikuntanathan and Vaikundavalli. During the last step of worship, religious instructions in the Vedas (sacred text) are recited by priests, and worshippers prostrate themselves in front of the temple mast. There are weekly, monthly and fortnightly rituals performed in the temple. The Vaikasi Brahmotsavam, celebrated during the Tamil month of Vaikasi (May–June), and Vaikunta Ekadashi celebrated during the Tamil month of Margaḻi (December–January) are the two major festivals celebrated in the temple. Verses from Nalayira Divya Prabandham are recited by a group of temple priests amidst music with nadasvaram (pipe instrument) and tavil (percussion instrument).

== Culture ==
This temple is revered in Nalayira Divya Prabandham, the 7th–9th century Vaishnava canon by Thirumangai Alvar in ten hymns. The temple is classified as a Divya Desam, one of the 108 Vishnu temples that are mentioned in the Sri Vaishnava canon. The temple is one of the fourteen Divya Desams in Kanchipuram and is part of Vishnu Kanchi, the place where most of the Vishnu temples in Kanchipuram are located. The temple is also revered in the verses of Divyakavi Pillai Perumal Iyengar.

The temple is declared as a heritage monument and administered by the Archaeological Survey of India as a protected monument.

== Gallery ==
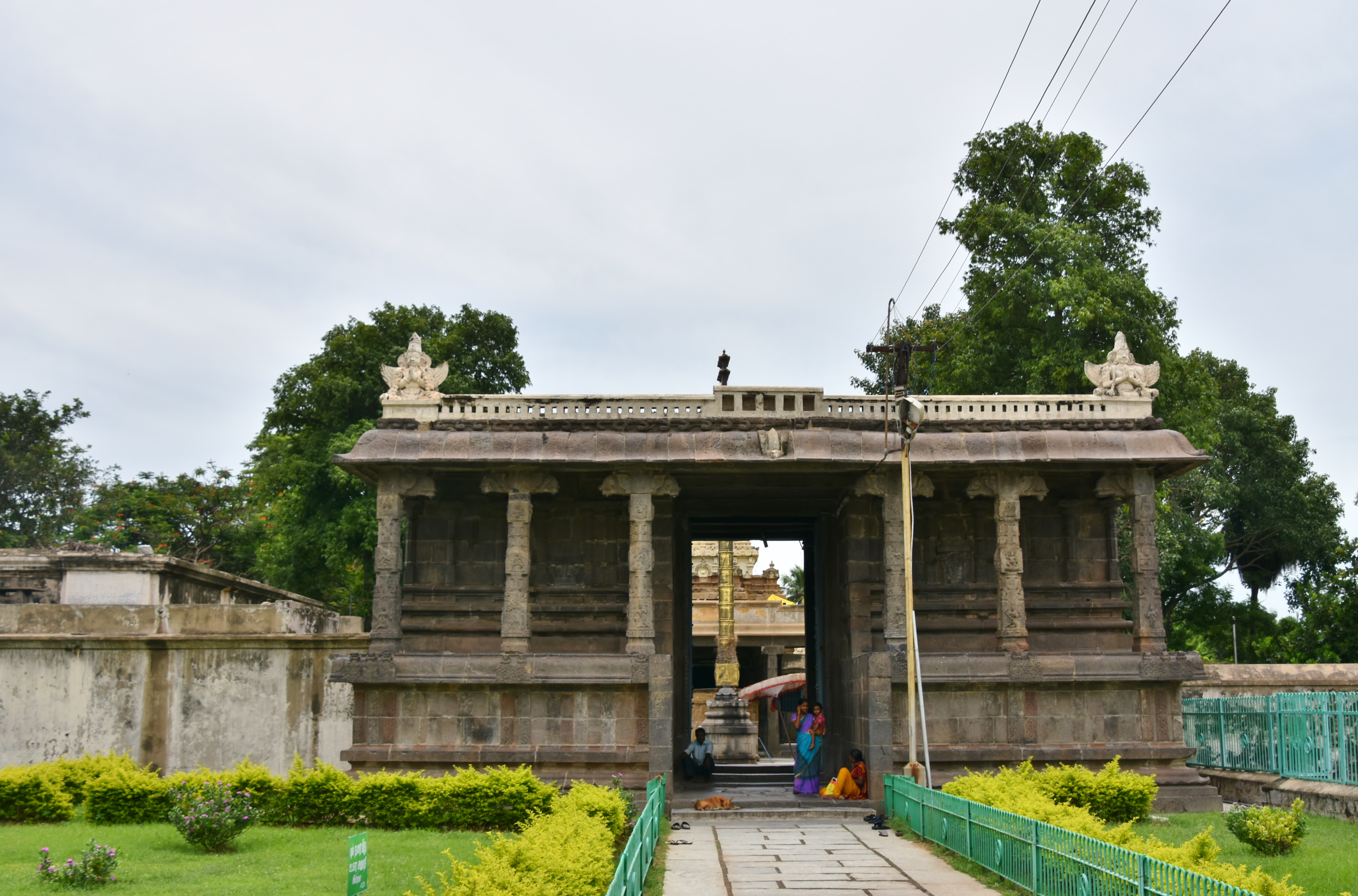
Entrance

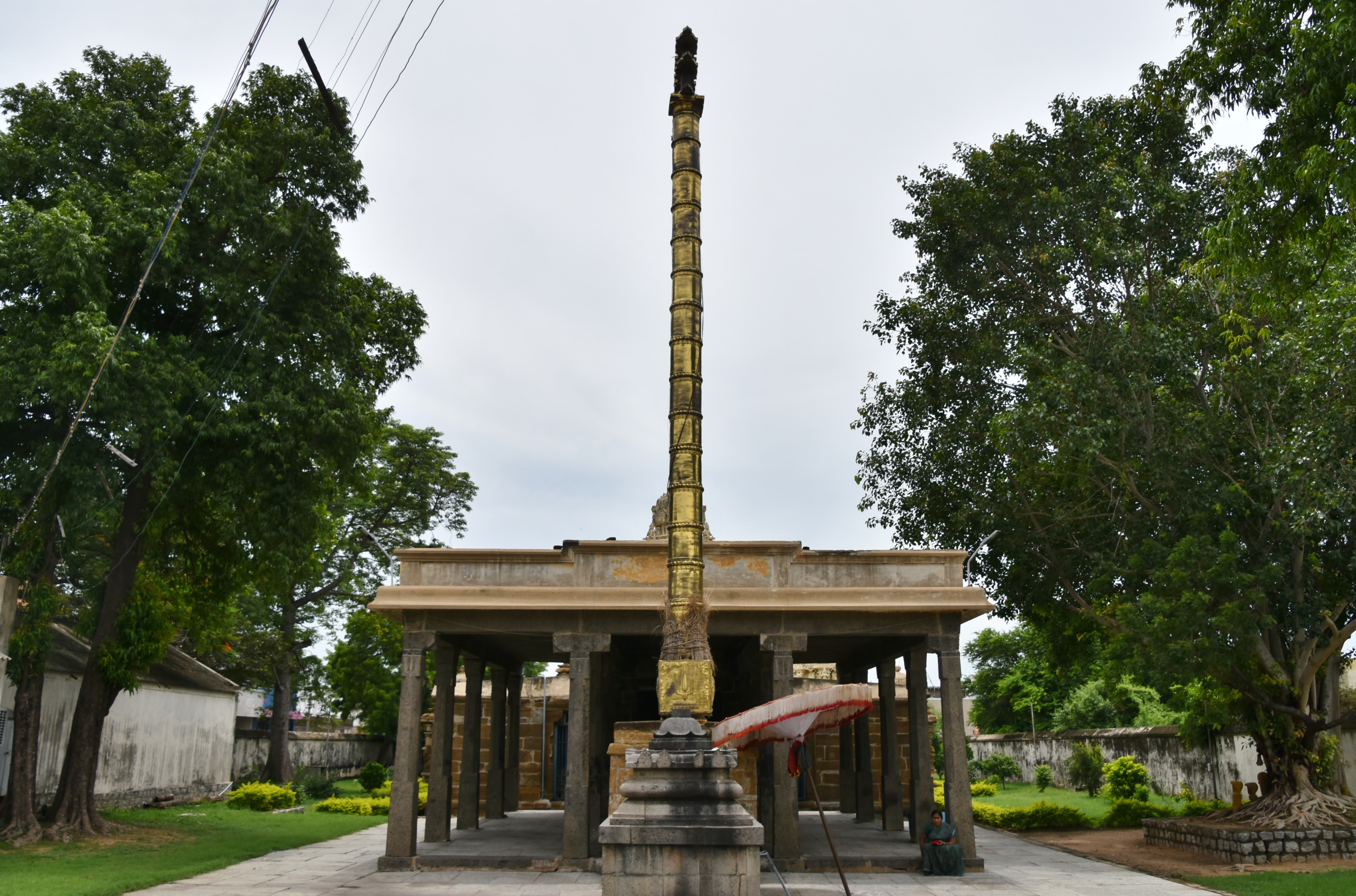
Flagpost

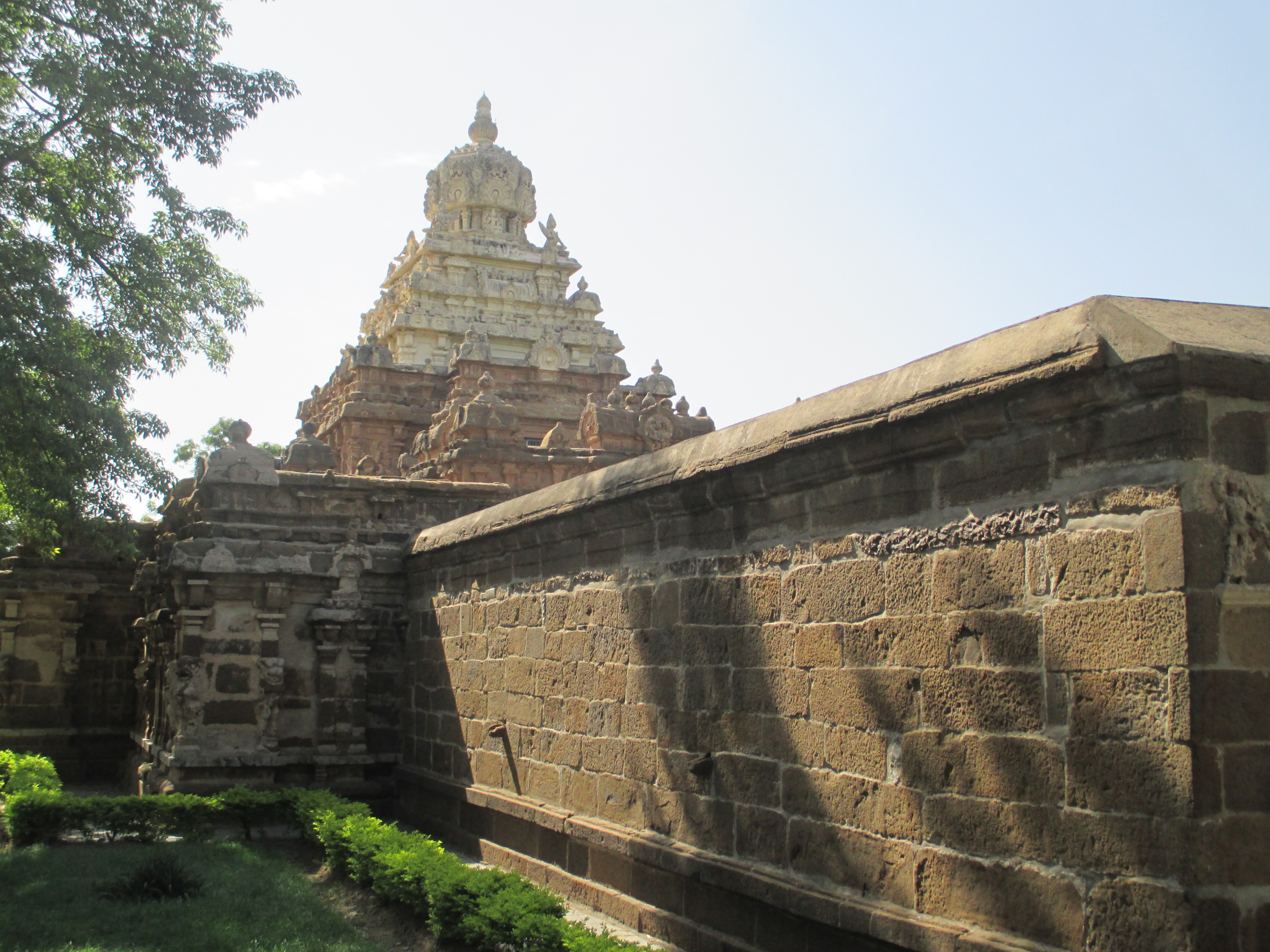
Outer prakara (right)

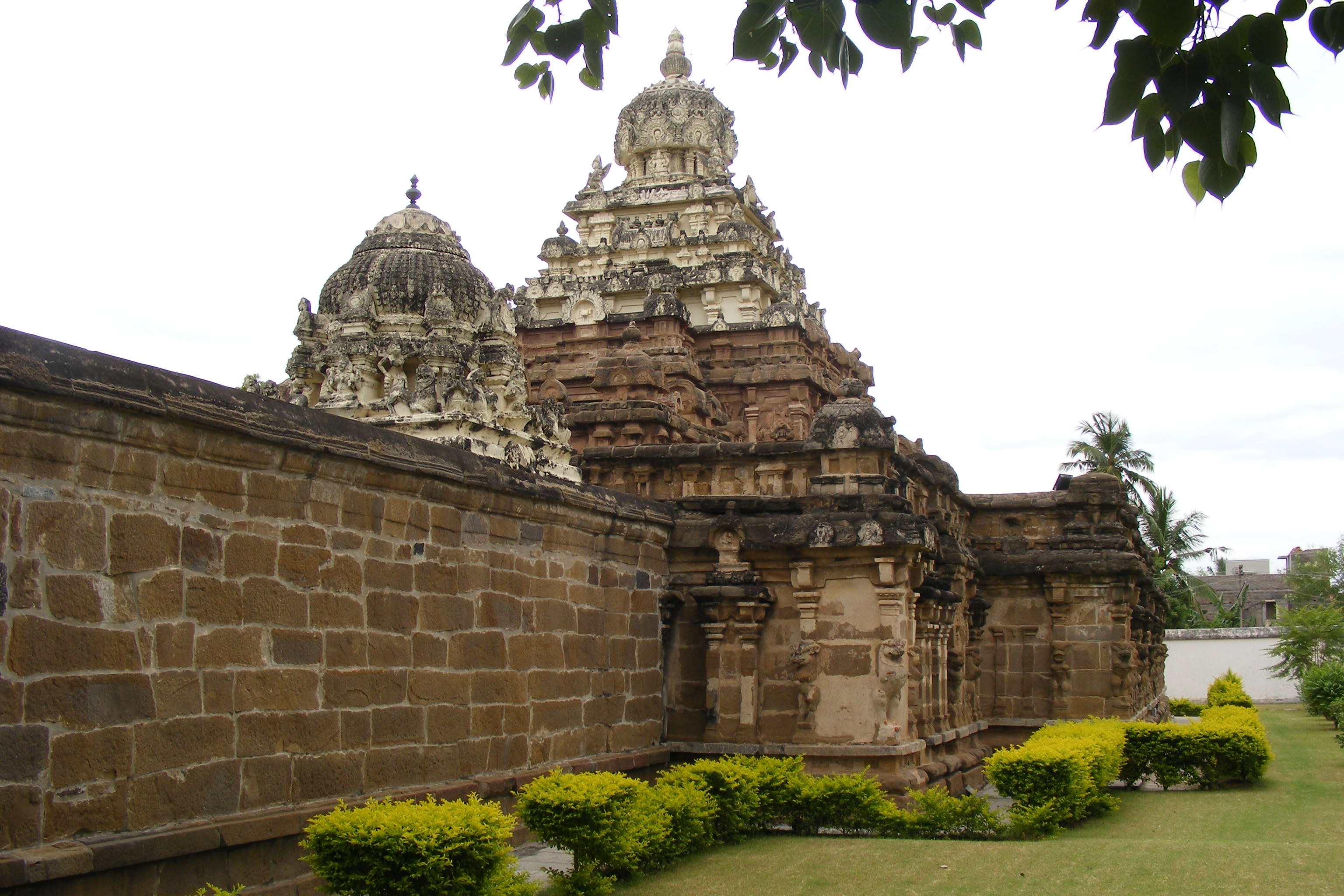
Outer prakara (left)

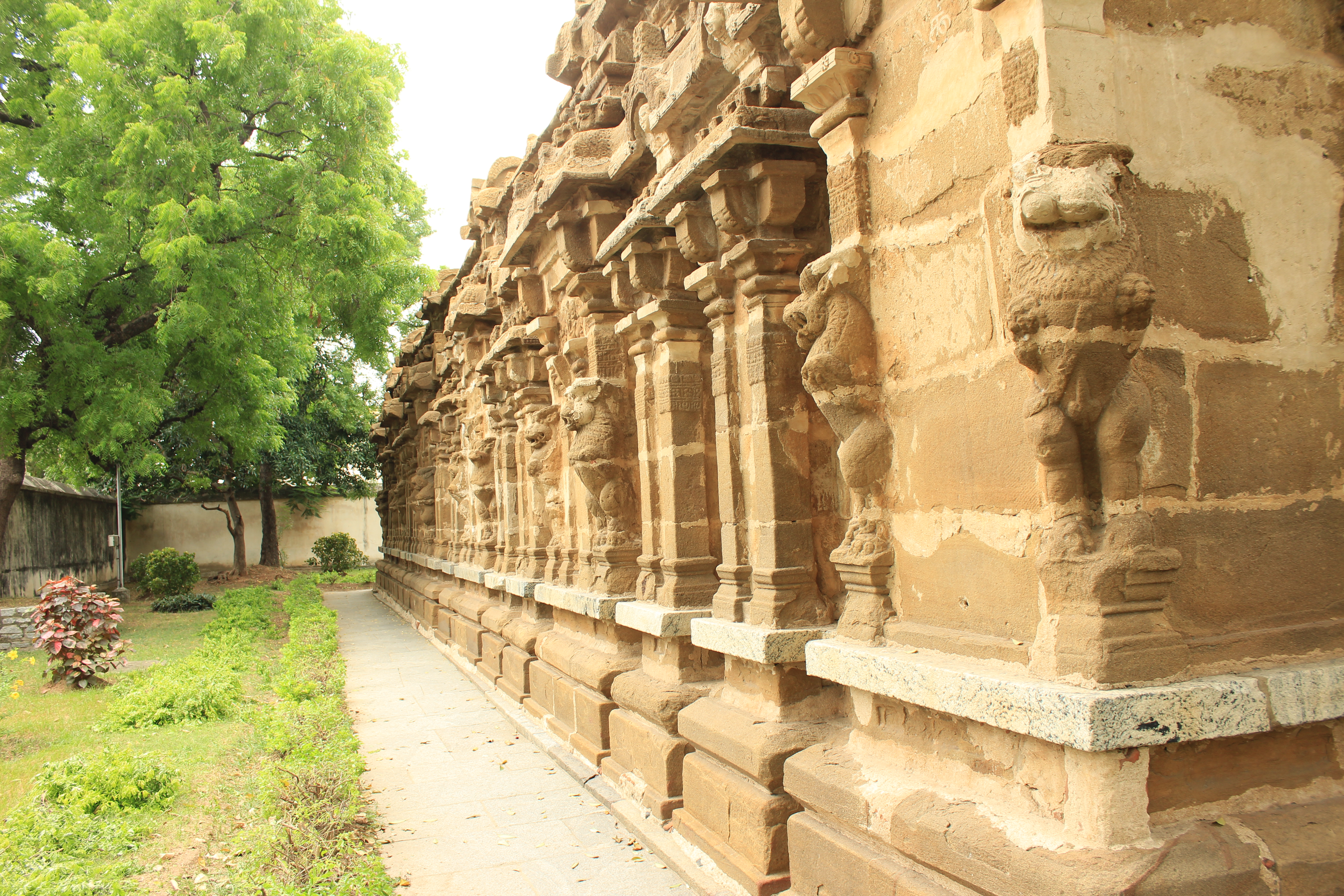
Outer prakara (right)

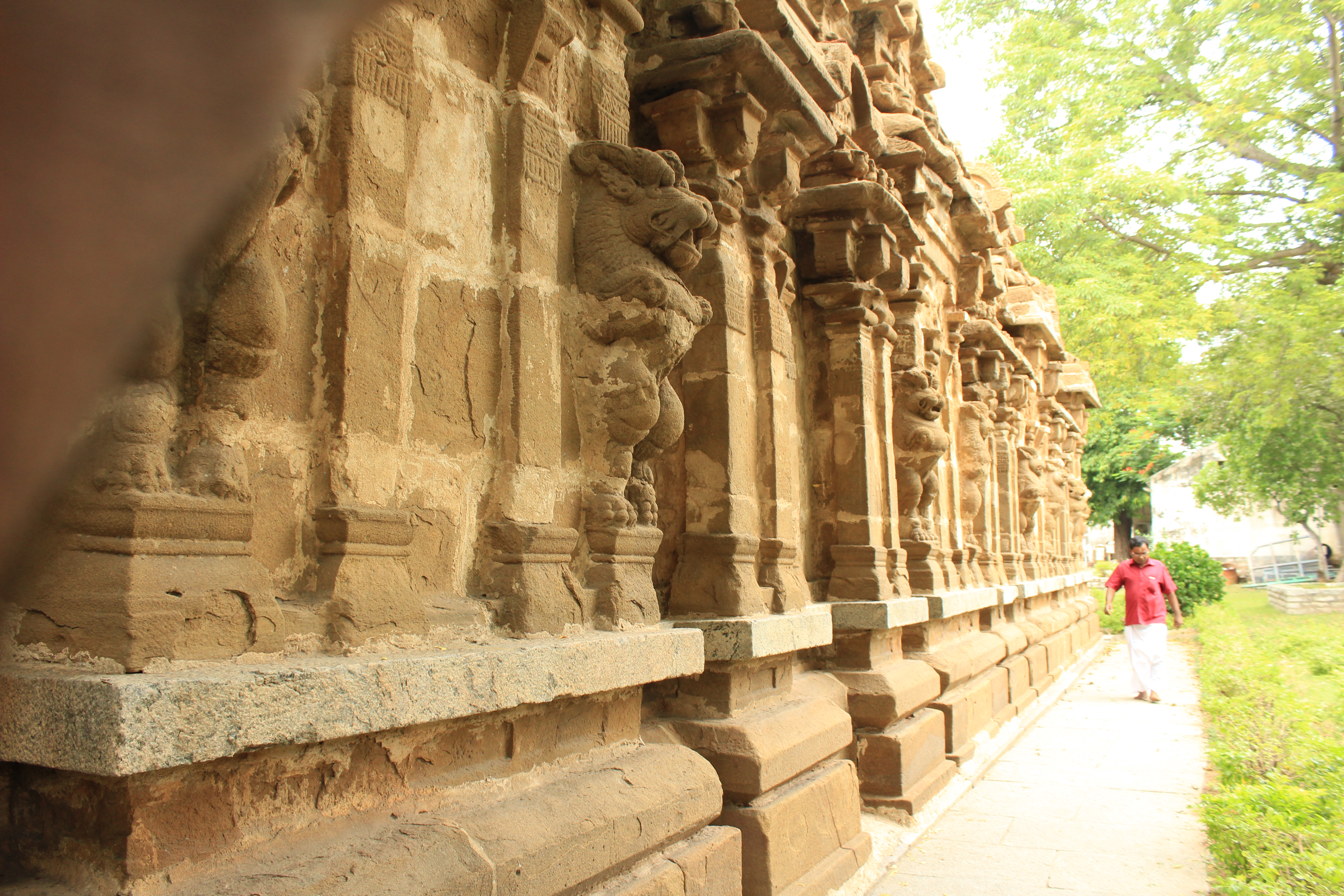
Outer prakara (left)

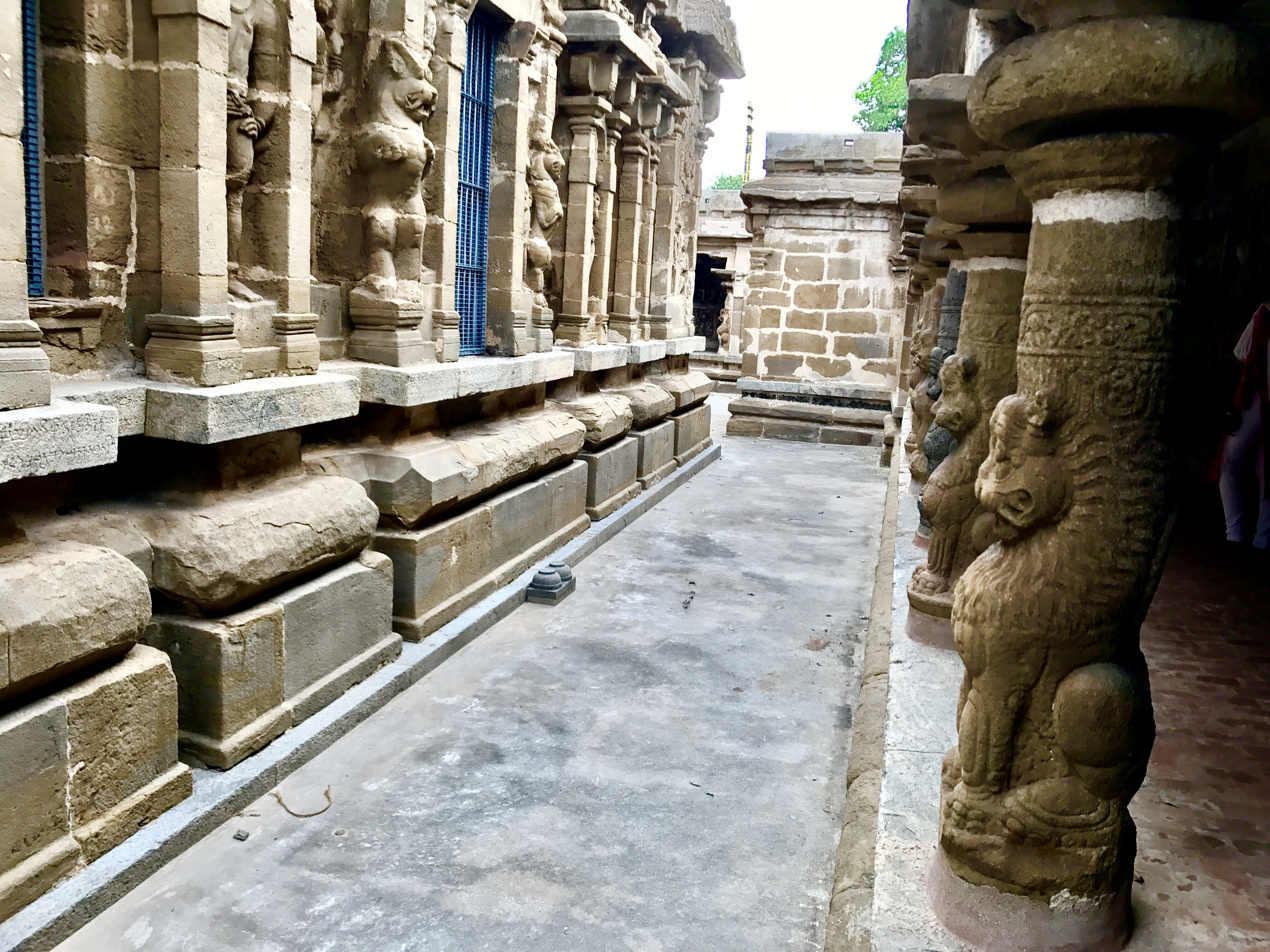
Inner prakara

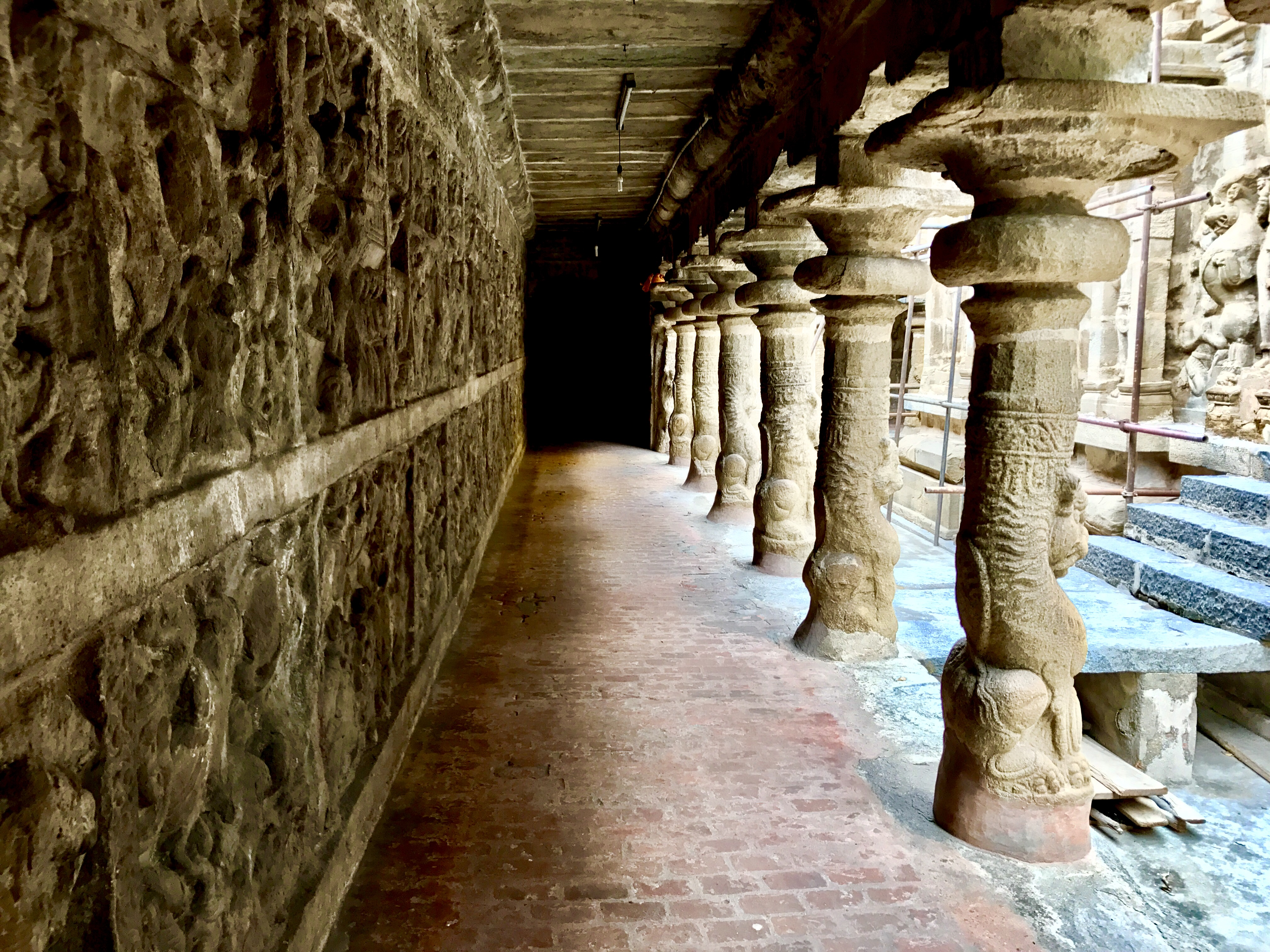
Inner prakara

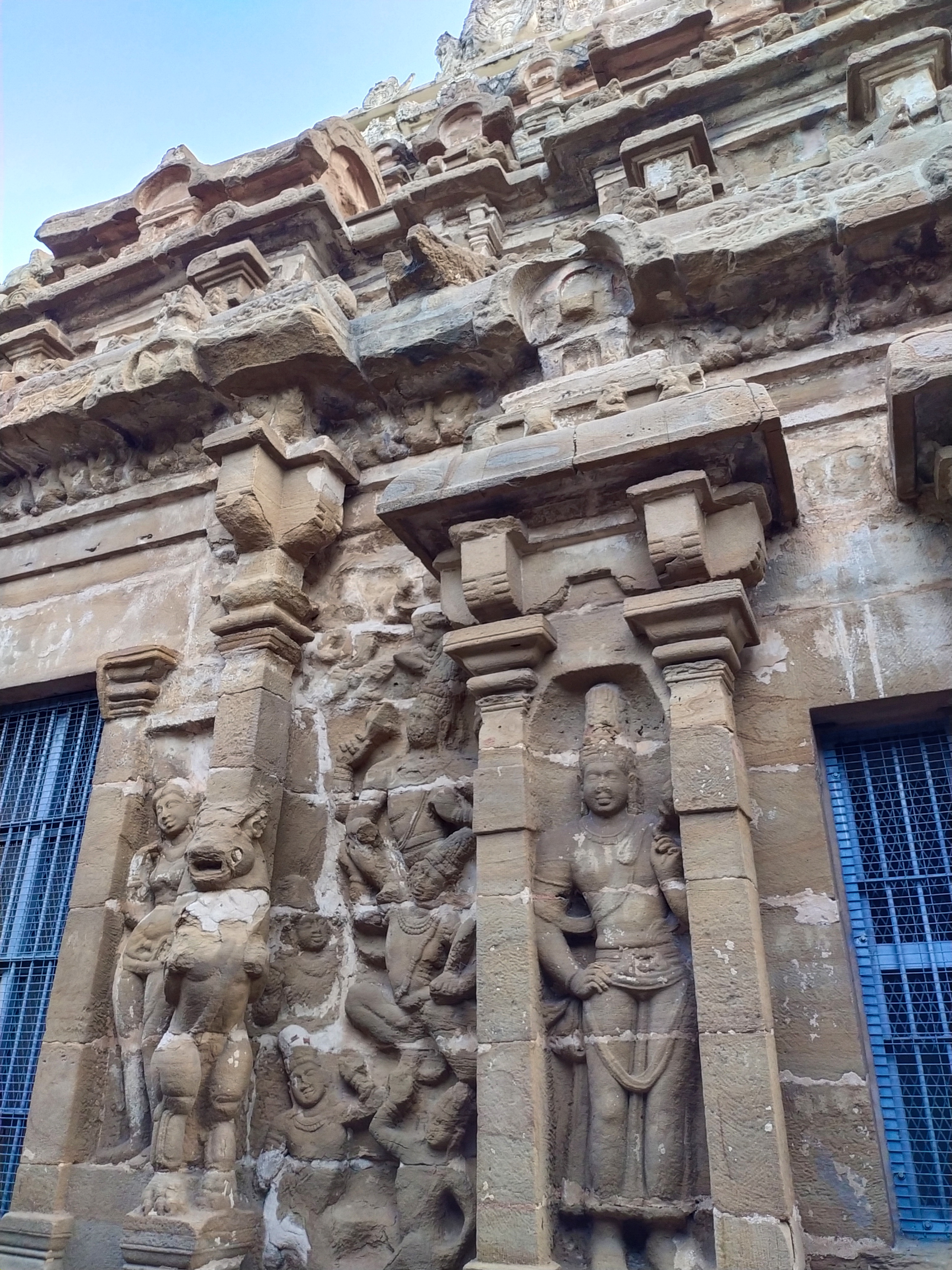
Vimana

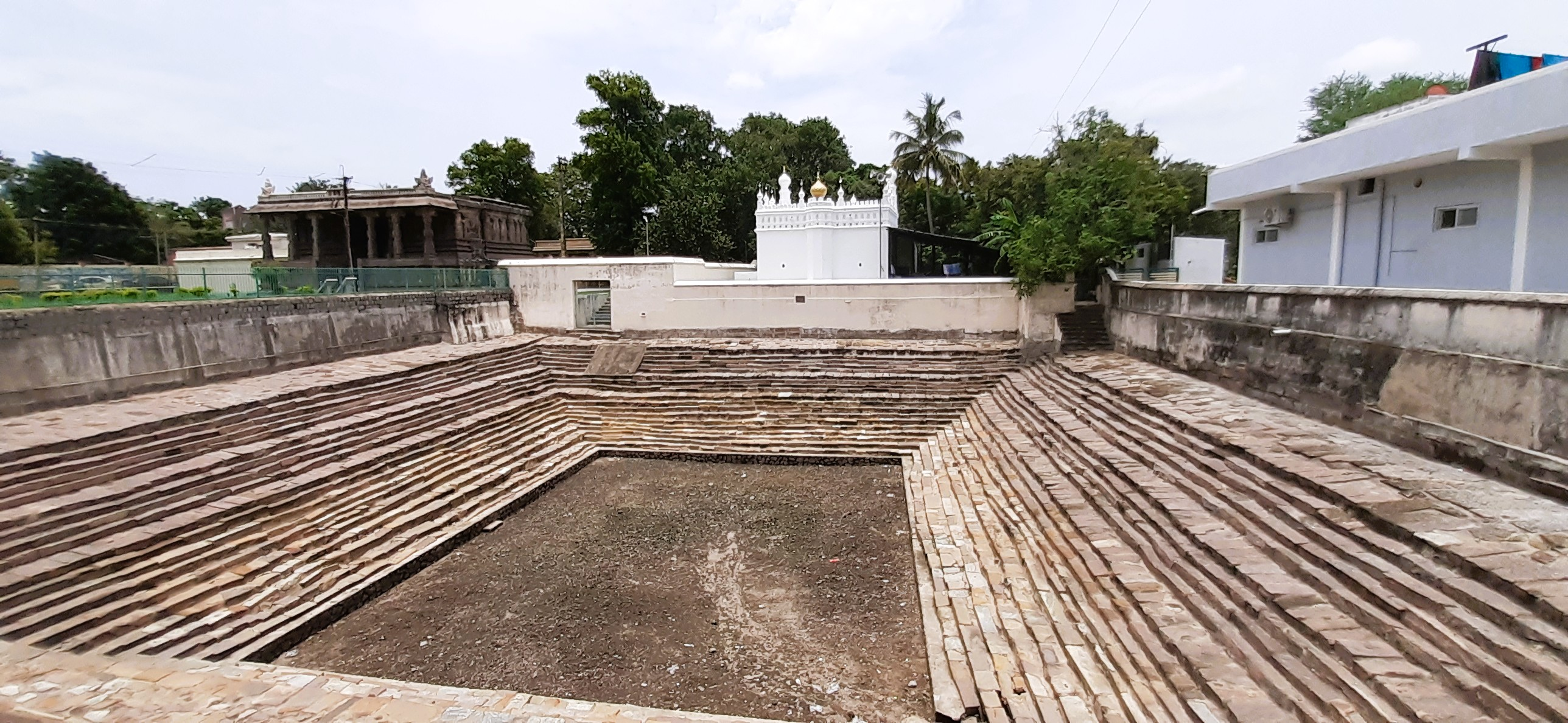
The temple tank

== Sources ==
- B.V., Ramanujam (1973). History of Vaishnavism in South India Upto Ramanuja. Annamalai University.
