= Vaikunta Perumal Mangadu =

Sri Vaikunta Perumal (Vaikunda Perumal) temple is a Vishnu temple situated about half a kilometer from the Kamakshi Temple Mangadu. It is administered by a trustee and the HR & CE departments of the Government of Tamil Nadu. The temple has a fairly large Ghoshala (Cow Care Center) housing more than 15 cows and calves. Daily poojas are conducted according to the Vaighanasa Agama as laid out by Sree Viganasha Acharya.

== Mythology ==
According to the mythology associated with the temple, Lord Vishnu accompanied by his consorts Sree Bhoodevi and Sree Shridevi visited this town to attend the purported marriage of Sree Kamakshi with Lord Shiva in his capacity as brother of Sree Kamakshi. He had to return as the scheduled marriage could not be solemnized in Mangadu. It is said that it is mandatory for Pilgrims visiting to Mangadu Kamakshi Amman Temple must also visit this Temple along with the Valleeswarar Temple and offer their prayers.

== The Temple ==
The Temple has a five Tier Vimana facing the Main road in the east direction. There is a Shrine for Thirukachi Nambi - Saint Philosopher and Guide to Sree Ramanujacharya in a seated posture. An idol of Sree Ramanujacharya has also been installed. Lord Vishnu is seen sporting a Ring that he had to present to Shri Kamakshi in his right palm. He is in a seated posture flanked by his consorts. Sage Markandeya Maharishi is seen in a seated posture meditating before the Lord. The Lord holds Chakra (Discuss) Shanku (Conch) in his upper arms. The Discuss and the Conch are carved out in a similar design to the Discuss and Conch in the Valleeswarar Temple, suggesting both the temples have origins around the same time. The Temple also houses separate shrines for Goddess Kanakavalli Thayar (Lakshmi) and Sree Andal. There are also separate shrines for Sree Chakarathalwar (Sudarshana) and Anjaneya.
