= Vaikunda Perumal Temple, Uthiramerur =

Vaikunta Perumal Temple
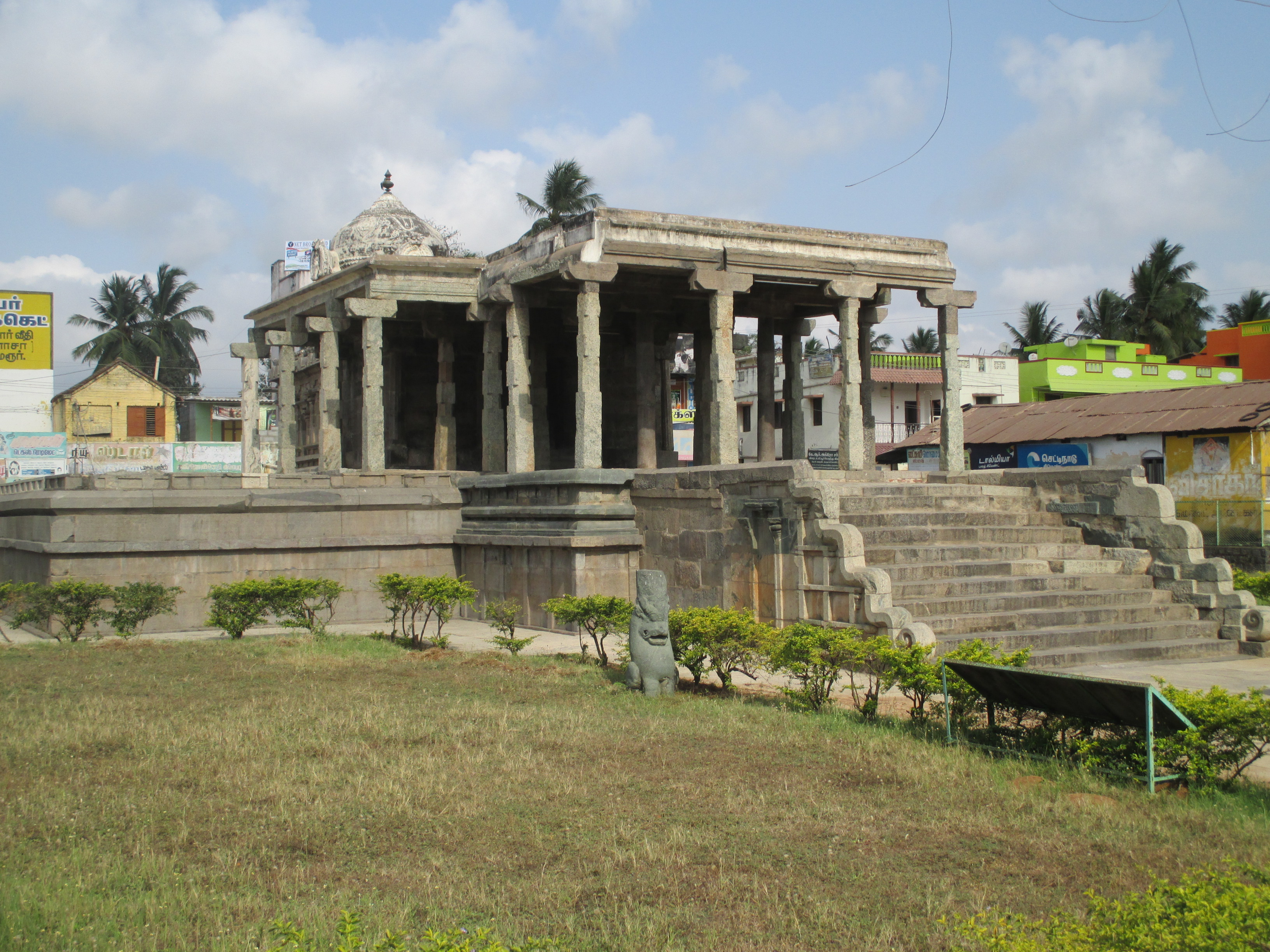

- Location in Tamil Nadu

Religion
- Affiliation: Hinduism
- District: Kanchipuram
- Deity: Vaikunta Perumal (Vishnu); Anandavalli (Lakshmi)

Location
- Location: Uthiramerur
- State: Tamil Nadu
- Country: India
- Coordinates: 12°52′49″N 79°42′45″E

Architecture
- Type: Dravidian
- Creator: Pallavan, Chola
- Inscriptions: Tamil

The Vaikunta Perumal Temple in Uthiramerur, a city in the Kanchipuram district of the South Indian state of Tamil Nadu, is dedicated to the Hindu god Vishnu. The temple is constructed in the Dravidian style of architecture. Vishnu is worshipped as Vaikunta Perumal and his consort Lakshmi as Anandavalli. The temple was originally built by the Pallavas, with later additions from the Cholas. The temple is known for the inscriptions indicating the democratic practices of electing representatives for the village bodies during the regime of Parantaka Chola (907–955 CE).This Vishnu Temple is mentioned in Narsingh Puran.

The building is declared as a heritage monument and administered by the Archeological Survey of India. Rajiv Gandhi, the then Prime Minister of India was inspired by the system after paying a visit to the temple and insisted on improving Panchayat Raj, India's system of local bodies in villages.

== History ==
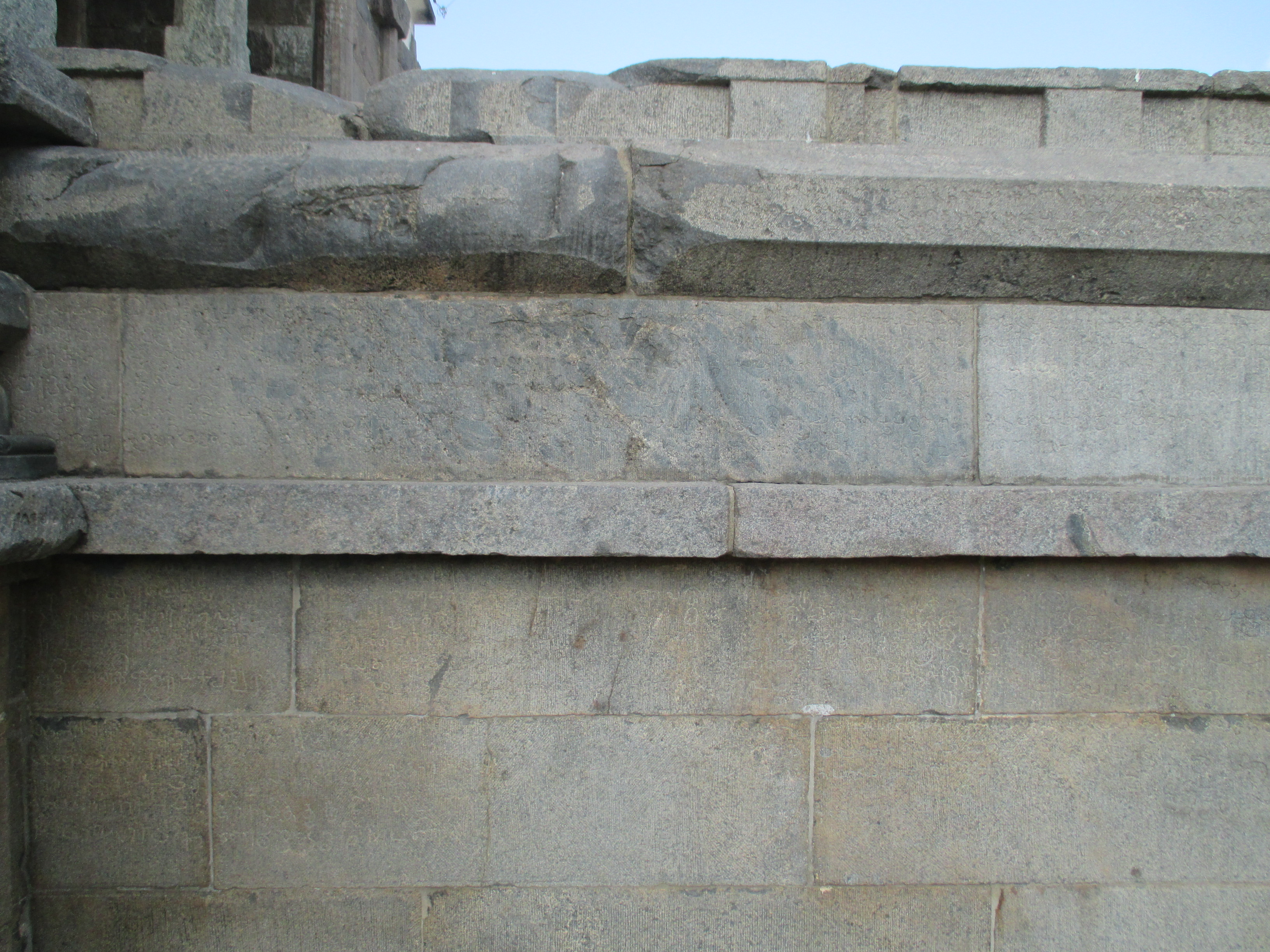
Inscriptions on the walls of the temple

Uthiramerur was ruled by the Pallavas, Cholas, Pandyas, Sambuvaraya, Vijayanagara Rayas and Nayaks. As per the inscriptions in the temple, the Pallava king Nandivarman II (Pallavamalla) 730–795 CE established the village around 750 CE. It is believed that he donated the village to the Vedic Brahmins from the Srivaishanva community.

The Cholas captured the region and it came under their dominion during the later part of 9th century. There are inscriptions from the period of Parantaka Chola I (907–950), Rajaraja Chola I (985–1014), Rajendra Chola I (1012–1044) and Kulothunga Chola I (1070–1120) indicating various gifts to the temples. The process of democratically electing the local representatives through a system called Kudavolai during the Chola regime is documented in the inscriptions. The temple is known for the inscriptions indicating the democratic practices of electing representatives for the village bodies during the regime of Parantaka Chola.

The region and the village went under the sway of the Pandyas during the 13th century and subsequently to the Telugu Chola ruler Vijaya Gandagopala. During the later period, the village switched hands to Pallava chieftains, Telugu Cholas, Samburavarayars and finally Kumara Kampana. The Vijayanagara emperor Krishnadevaraya (1502–29) made contributions to the Vaikunta temple, Subhramanya temple and Kailasanatha temple in the village. The temple is declared as a heritage monument and administered by the Archeological Survey of India.

== Architecture ==
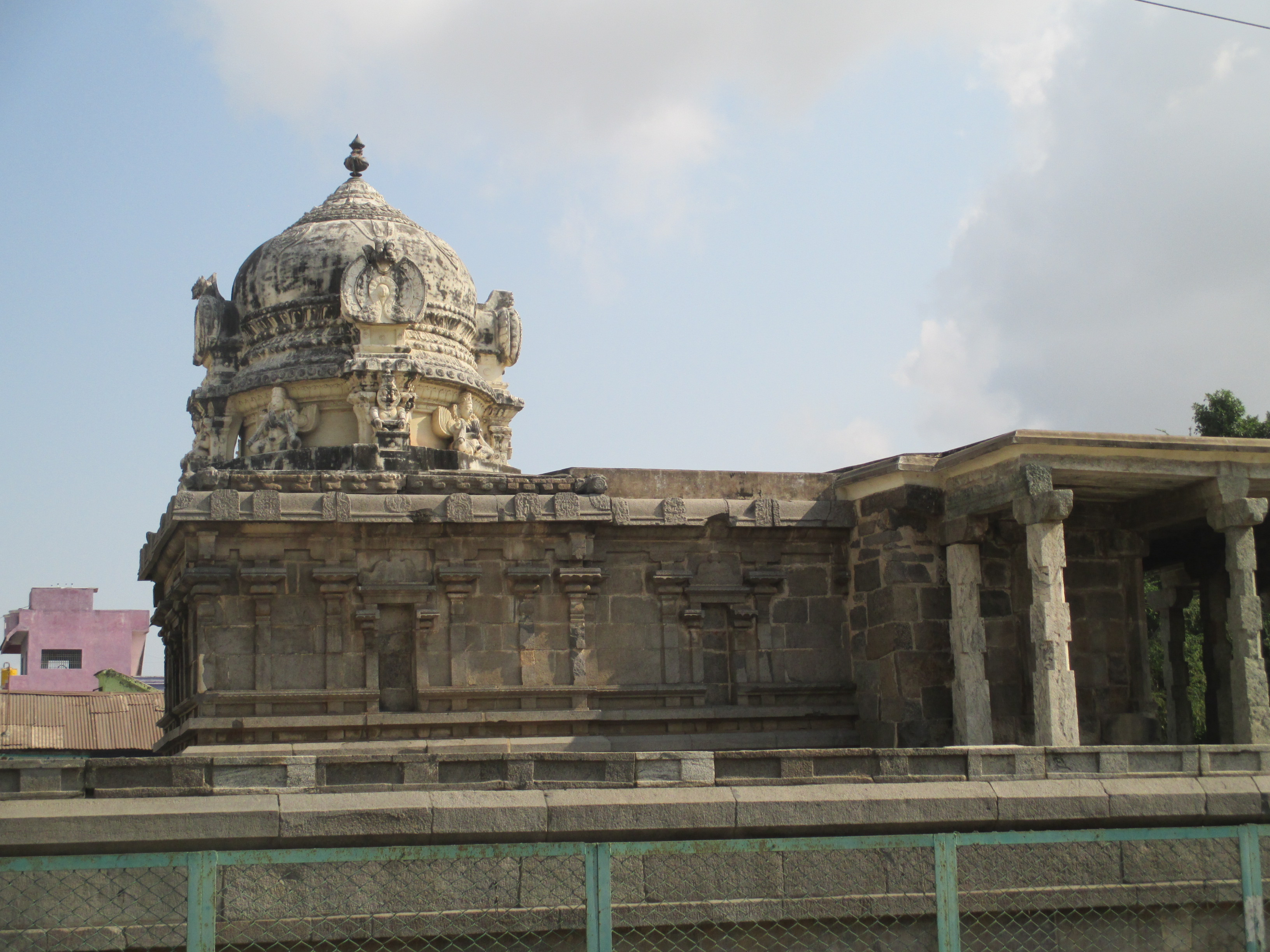
The main shrine of the temple

Vaikunta Perumal temple covers an area of about 0.5 acres (0.20 hectares). The sanctum houses the image of Vaikuntanatha in a seated posture with Sridevi and Bhudevi on either side. There is an assembly hall 2,500 sq ft (230 m^{2}). The roof of the temple rests on the walls and there are no pillars. The inscriptions from the Chola period are made on the walls of the assembly hall. Kulothunga Chola is believed to have built the roof of the assembly hall which made it an assembly hall along with the temple. As per another view, the entire structure was originally an assembly hall and it collapsed during the regime of Kulothunga Chola. He rebuilt the assembly hall along with the temple housing the image of Vaikunta Perumal in it. Some of the inscriptions also read that the village was planned as per Agamic texts with the assembly hall in the centre of the village and the temples of the village built around it.

== Kudavolai system ==
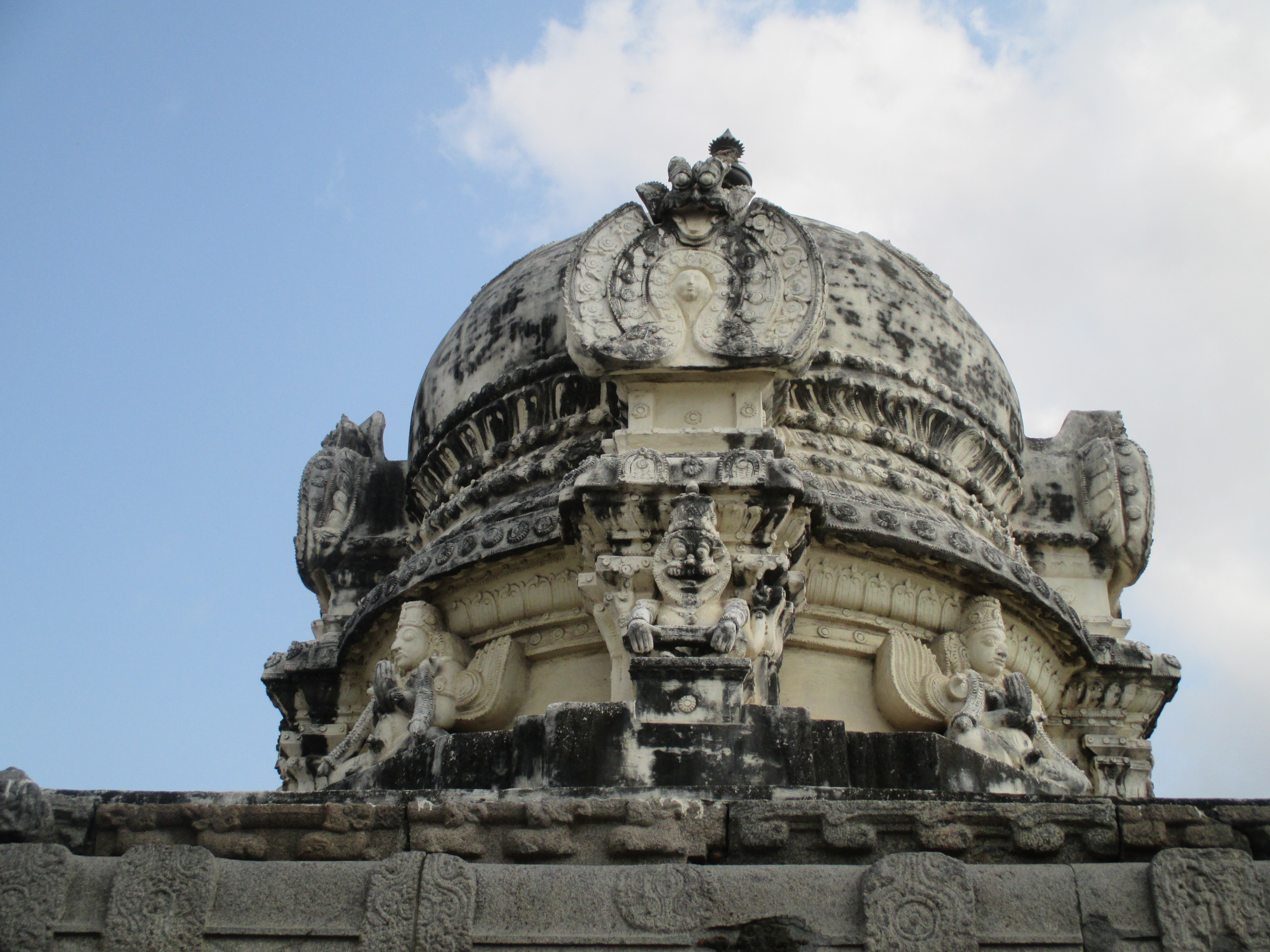
Stucco image of Narasimha seen on the vimana

The inscriptions of the temple indicate that the villagers requested the rulers to allow them to choose their own representatives. Parantaka Chola readily acceded to their demand and instituted the Kudavolai system (ballot) of democratically electing the village representatives. The rules of electing and the eligibility of the representatives and voters are described in detail in the inscriptions. The villagers assembled at a common place and wrote the name of their preferred representative on a palm leaf and put it in a pot. Kudam in Tamil is a pot and volai means the palm leaf, leading to the name of Kudavolai. Only people in pilgrimage or senescence were exempt from voting. The eligibilities of the candidates were prescribed with minimum age, educational qualifications and property. There were strictures for the candidates should have built their house in their own property, should not be part of any other committee and be between 35 and 70 years of age. The voters had the right to recall their candidate for failing to fulfill their duties. The inscriptions also specified strict punishments for the corrupt like disallowing their next seven generations to contest if found guilty. The institution was dismembered along with the end of the Chola regime during the 13th century. Rajiv Gandhi, the then Prime Minister of India was inspired by the system after paying a visit to the temple and insisted on improving Panchayat Raj, India's system of local bodies in villages.
