= Uthiramerur =

Uthiramerur Uttaramerur, Uttiramerur
- panchayat town
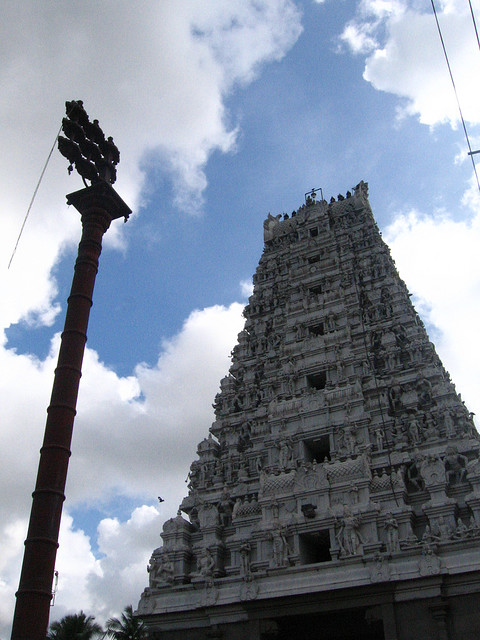

- Location in Tamil Nadu, India
- Coordinates: 12.616°N 79.753°E
- Country: India
- State: Tamil Nadu
- District: Kancheepuram

Area
  - Total: 8 km^{2} (3.1 sq mi)
- Elevation: 62 m (203 ft)

Population (2011)
  - Total: 25,194
  - Density: 3,100/km^{2} (8,200/sq mi)

Languages
  - Official: Tamil
- Time zone: UTC+5:30 (IST)

Uthiramerur is a panchayat town in Kancheepuram district in the Indian state of Tamil Nadu. It is situated 90 km south west of Chennai, the capital of Tamil Nadu. It is noted for its temple inscriptions that describe a self-governance system existing around 7th to 9th century CE.

== History ==
Uthiramerur originally existed as a Brahmin settlement. The Pallava king Nandivarman II (720–796 CE) formally established it as a brahamdeya village around 750 CE. It is believed that he donated the village to Vedic Brahmins from Srivaishanva community. A tenth century inscription states the name of the village as "Uttaramerur Chaturvedi Mangalam".

Around 25 inscriptions, spanning reigns of around four Pallava kings, have been found at Uthiramerur. In the later part of the 9th century, the Cholas captured the region. There are inscriptions from the period of Parantaka Chola I (907–950), Rajaraja Chola I (985–1014), Rajendra Chola I (1012–1044) and Kulothunga Chola I (1070–1120), indicating various gifts to the temples.

The region and the village came under the Pandya authority during the 13th century. Later, the Telugu Chola ruler Vijaya Gandagopala gained control of the territory, and renamed the village Gandagopala Chaturvedhi Managalam. During the later period, the village was part of the territories of Sambuvarayas and Kumara Kampana. The Vijayanagara emperor Krishnadevaraya (1502–29) made contributions to the Sundaravarada Perumal Temple, Subhramanya temple and Kailasanatha temple. The village was the scene of war between Lingma and Yachama during the 17th century. The Carnatic Wars were fought in the nearby Vandavasi between the British and the French during the 18th century. From the period of 14th century, a steady decline is seen in agriculture on account of the political instability.

=== Village administration ===
The temple inscriptions of Uthiramerur are notable for their historical descriptions of the rural self-governance. They indicate that Uthiramerur had two village assemblies: Sabha and Ur. The Sabha an exclusively Brahmin (priestly class) assembly, while the Ur was made up of people belonging to all the classes.

The earliest surviving inscriptions from Uthiramerur date to the reign of the Pallava king Dantivarman (795-846 CE). These inscriptions indicate that the Sabha was already a well-established and mature institution by this time. It managed land sales and an endowment fund for dredging a tank. It also assigned some duties to the Ur for managing the land deserted by tenants who could not afford to pay the taxes. A later inscription, from the reign of Dantivarman's successor Nandivarman III (846-869), describes the qualifications and tenure of archaka (priest) in a local temple. According to these early inscriptions, the Sabha assembled in the hall of the local temple. The meetings were summoned through beating of the drums. The inscriptions also contain several references to variyars, the executive officers subordinate to the Sabha.

Two later inscriptions of the Chola king Parantaka I (907–955) indicate the evolution of the administrative system. Instead of variyars (who were individuals), the executive powers were given to committees called variyams. Each variyam constituted 6 to 12 members, depending on the importance of its functions. The first inscription, dated to 919 CE, describes the rules for electing the committee members. The second inscription, dated to 921 CE, describes some amendments to these rules to make them more practical.

According to the 921 CE inscription, the village had 30 kudumbus or wards, from which the members of following committees were selected annually:

Name	Number of members	Meaning
Samvatsara-Variyam	12	Annual Committee (or Garden and Tank Committee, since its membership was restricted to the elders who had served on these two committees)
Totta-Variyam	12	Garden Committee
Eri-Variyam	6	Tank Committee
Panchavara-Variyam	Unknown	Standing Committee
Pon-Variyam	Unknown	Gold Committee

The inscription lays down the following qualifications for a nominee:

- Ownership of tax-paying land sized at least one-fourth of a veli (about an acre and a half). The land-owning requirement was reduced to one-eighth veli for people who had learned at least one Veda and one Bhashya.
- Residence in a house built on self-owned land
- Age between 35 and 70 years
- Knowledge of mantras and the Brahmanas (Vedic literature)
- Not one of the following:
  - An existing committee member (any committee) for the past 3 years
  - An existing committee member who (or whose relatives) had failed to submit accounts
  - One who (or whose relatives) had committed incest or first of the 5 great sins (the 5 great sins being killing a Brahmin, drinking alcohol, theft, adultery and associating with criminals).
  - One who has been an outcaste for association with low caste (unless he performs expiatory ceremonies)
  - One who is foolhardy
  - One who has stolen the property of others
  - One who has taken forbidden dishes

The candidates were selected via Kudavoloi (literally, pot [of] palm leaf [tickets]) system:

- Names of qualified candidates were written on palm leaf tickets
- The tickets were put into a pot and shuffled
- A young boy was asked to take out as many tickets as the number of positions available
- The name on the ticket was read out by all the priests
- The candidate, whose name was read out, was selected

The tenure of a committee member was 360 days. Anyone found guilty of an offence was immediately removed from the office. The Uthiramerur inscriptions indicate that parading on donkey was a punishment for offences such as incest, adultery, theft and forgery.

== Demographics ==
According to the 2011 census of India, the area administered by the Uthiramerur town panchayat has a population of 25,194, including 12,569 males and 12,625 females. The town is divided into 18 wards. The effective literacy rate (i.e. the literacy rate of population excluding children aged 6 and below) is 81.74%.

=== Religion ===
Hinduism (87.39%) and Christianity (9.00%) are the major religions.

The village has several important Hindu temples. The Sundaravarada Perumal temple is about 1200 years old, and was built under the reign of the Pallava king Nandivarman II. Other major temples are Vaikunda Perumal Temple and Subramanya temple.

== Politics ==
The town is administered by a town panchayat. Uthiramerur and its surrounding areas are represented in the Tamil Nadu Legislative Assembly by an MLA. The Uthiramerur assembly constituency is a part of the Kanchipuram parliamentary constituency.
