= Architecture of Tamil Nadu =

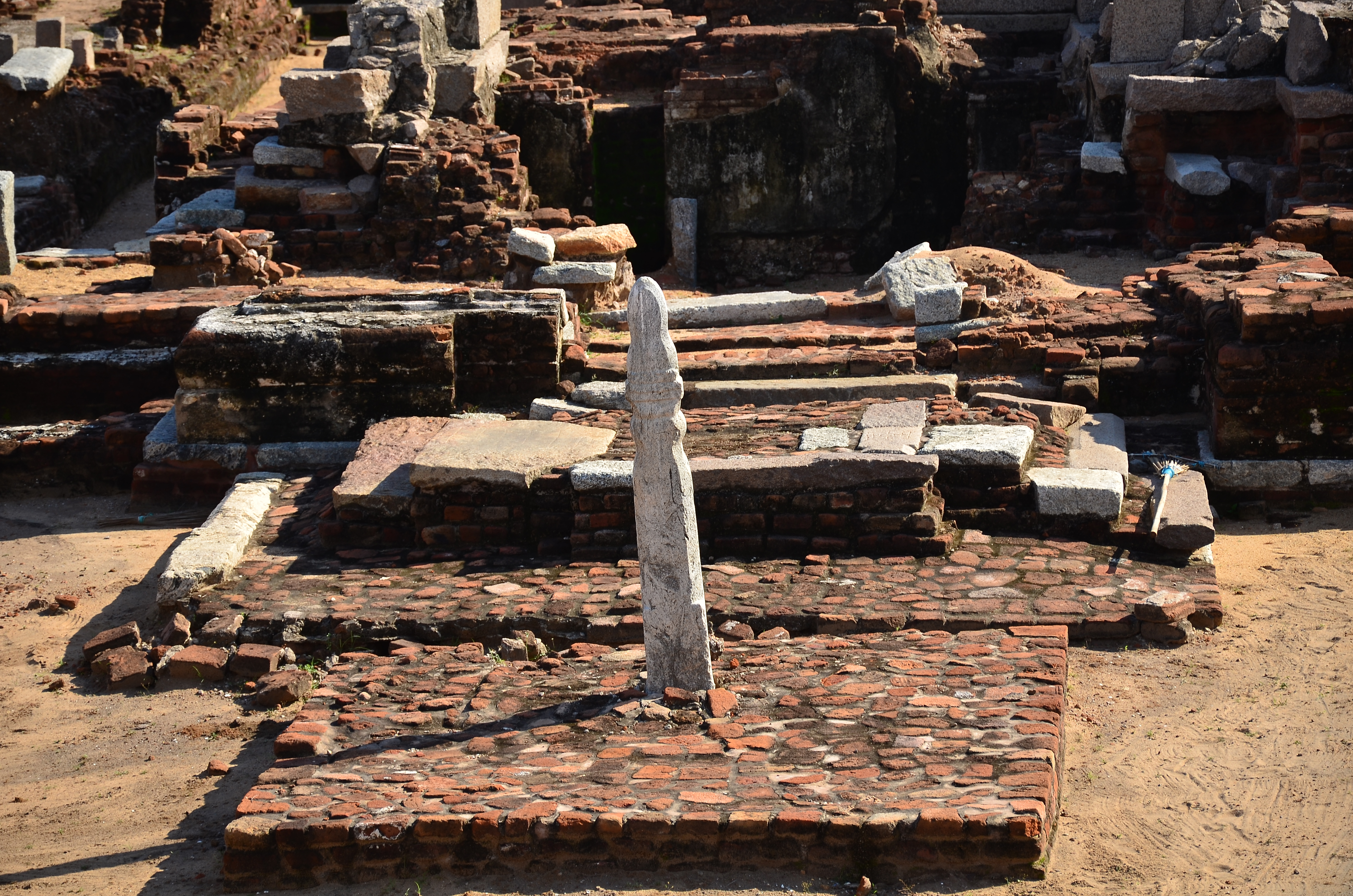
Murugan temple at Saluvankuppam. One of the oldest in Tamil Nadu.

Tamil Nadu is renowned for its ancient temple architecture, with nearly 33,000 temples–many between 800 and 2,000 years old–scattered across the state. According to the Tamil Nadu Hindu Religious and Charitable Endowments Department, the state administers 38,615 temples. Most of the largest Hindu temples are located in Tamil Nadu. Studded with intricate architecture, varied sculptures, and rich inscriptions, the temples remain central to the culture and heritage of the Tamil region, with historical records dating back at least 3,000 years.

The state also abounds with numerous temple tanks. The state features 2,359 temple tanks across 1,586 temples. Beyond ancient temples, Tamil Nadu hosts a confluence of architectural styles ranging from colonial-era Indo-Saracenic buildings (pioneered in Madras) to historic churches, mosques and modern 20th-century skyscrapers.

== History ==
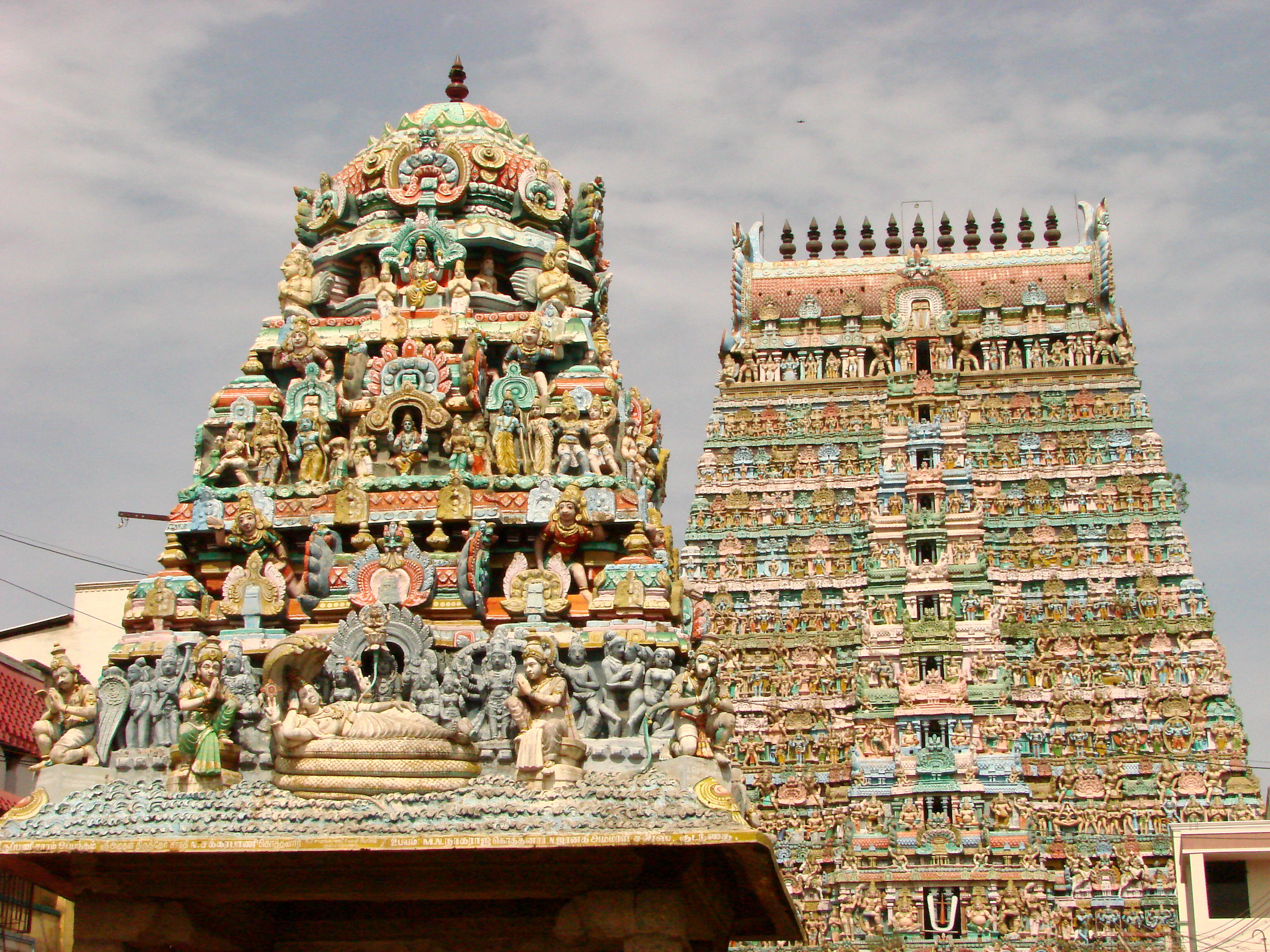
Sarangapani temple, Kumbakonam. The Sanctum sanctorum is designed like Chariot, Chola architecture

Throughout the history of Tamil Nadu, a king was considered to be divine by nature and possessed religious significance. The king was 'the representative of God on earth’ and lived in a "koyil", which means the "residence of God". The Modern Tamil word for temple is kovil. Titular worship was also given to kings. Other words for king, like "kō" ("king"), "iṟai" ("emperor"), and "āṇḍavar" ("conqueror") now primarily refer to God. Tholkappiyar, refers to the Three Crowned Kings as the "Three Glorified by Heaven". In the Dravidian-speaking South, the concept of divine kingship led to the assumption of major roles by state and the temple.

== Sangam period architecture ==
From 580 BCE to 300 CE, the greatest accomplishments of the kingdoms of the early Chola, Chera and the Pandyan kingdoms included brick shrines to deities Murugan, Shiva, Amman and Vishnu. Several of these have been unearthed near Adichanallur, Kaveripoompuharpattinam and Mahabalipuram, and the construction plans of these sites of worship were shared to some detail in various poems of Sangam literature. One such temple, the Saluvannkuppan Murugan temple, unearthed in 2005, consists of three layers. The lowest layer, consisting of a brick shrine, is one of the oldest of its kind in South India, and is the oldest shrine found dedicated to Murugan. It is one of only two brick shrine pre Pallava Hindu temples to be found in the state, the other being the Veetrirundha Perumal Temple at Veppathur dedicated to Vishnu. The dynasties of early medieval Tamilakkam expanded and erected structural additions to many of these brick shrines. Sculptures of erotic art, nature and deities from the Ranganathaswamy Temple and Kallazhagar temple date from the Sangam period. Many of the temples of this time have been built on either bricks or granite stones, but they did not survive until modern times due to the destruction caused by the invasion of the Delhi Sultanate Empire under the leadership of Malik Kafur.

Several brick structures dating to the Sangam era have been unearthed at places across Tamil Nadu such as Keeladi, Adichanallur and Kodumanal. The findings at these sites indicate that the buildings were built using burnt bricks.

The Srirangam Ranganathaswamy temple is mentioned in various Sanskrit Literatures in various periods like the Ramayana, Mahabharatha, Padma Purana, Brahmanda Purana and Garuda Puranam. There are mentions even in the Tamil literature of the Sangam era (300 BCE to 300 CE), there are mentions in many books like Akanaṉūṟu, Purananuru, Paripāṭal and Silapadikaram. Example:- Silapadikaram (book 11, lines 35–40):

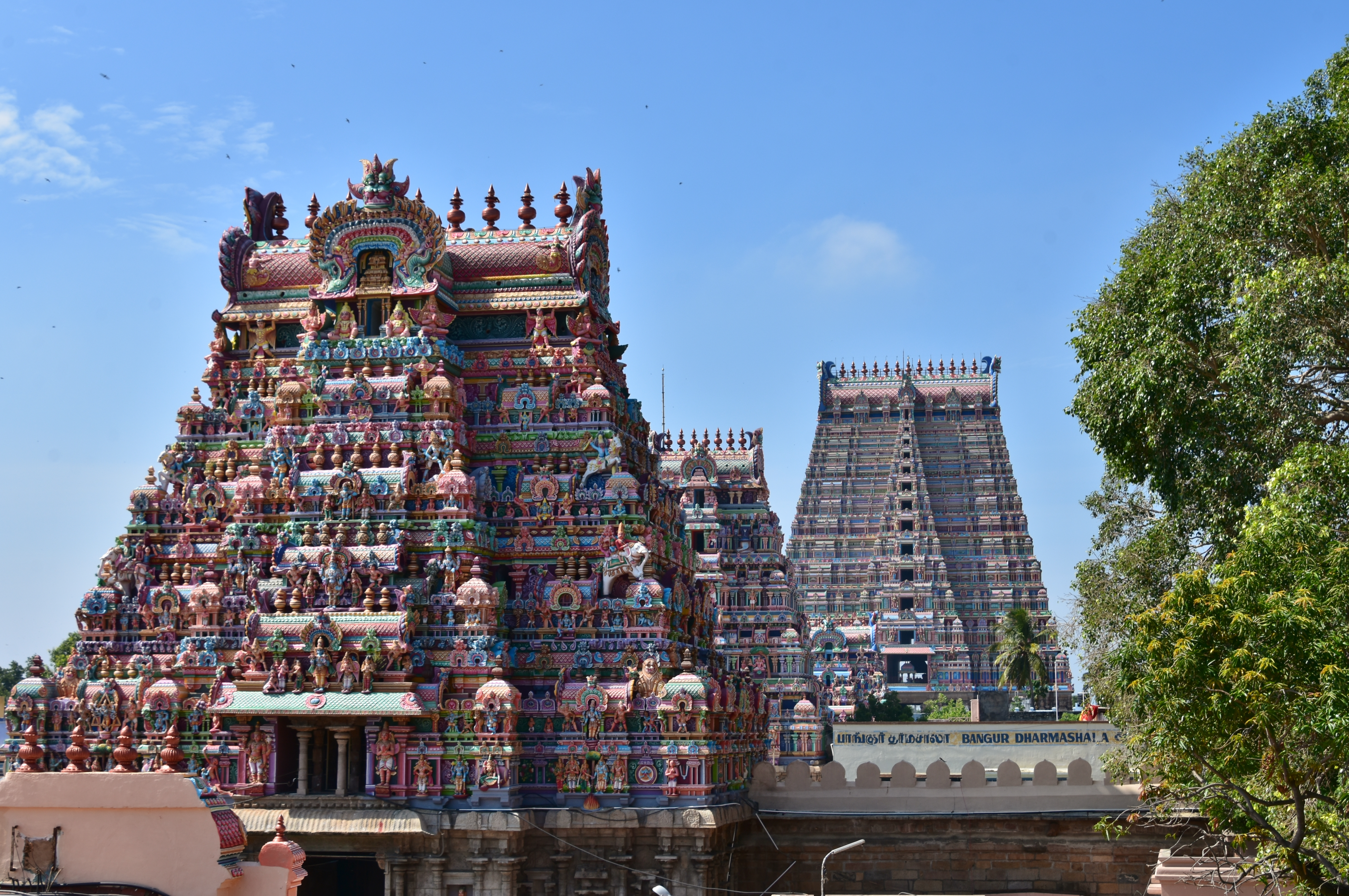
Srirangam Ranganathaswamy temple is the largest functioning religious complex in the world and mentioned in the Sangam literature of the Sangam era (500 BCE - 300 CE), there are mentions in many books like Akanaṉūṟu, Purananuru, Paripāṭal and Silapadikaram.

The Srirangam Ranganathaswamy temple was first built by the Chola ruler, Dharmavarma. The Kaveri river flood destroyed the temple vimanam, and later, the early Cholas King Killivalavan rebuilt the temple complex as is present today. Beyond the ancient textual history, archaeological evidence such as inscriptions refer to this temple, and these stone inscriptions are from late 100 BCE to 100 CE. Hence, making it one of the oldest surviving active temple complexes in the world. There are many mandapas which were built near the main Sanctum Sanctorum which dates around 100 CE to 300 CE built by Uraiyur Cholas. There were later additions of structures and inscriptions in the temple which belong to the Chola, Pandya, Hoysala, Marathas and Vijayanagara dynasties who ruled over the region. These inscriptions range in date between the 7th and 17th centuries.

== Pallava architecture ==
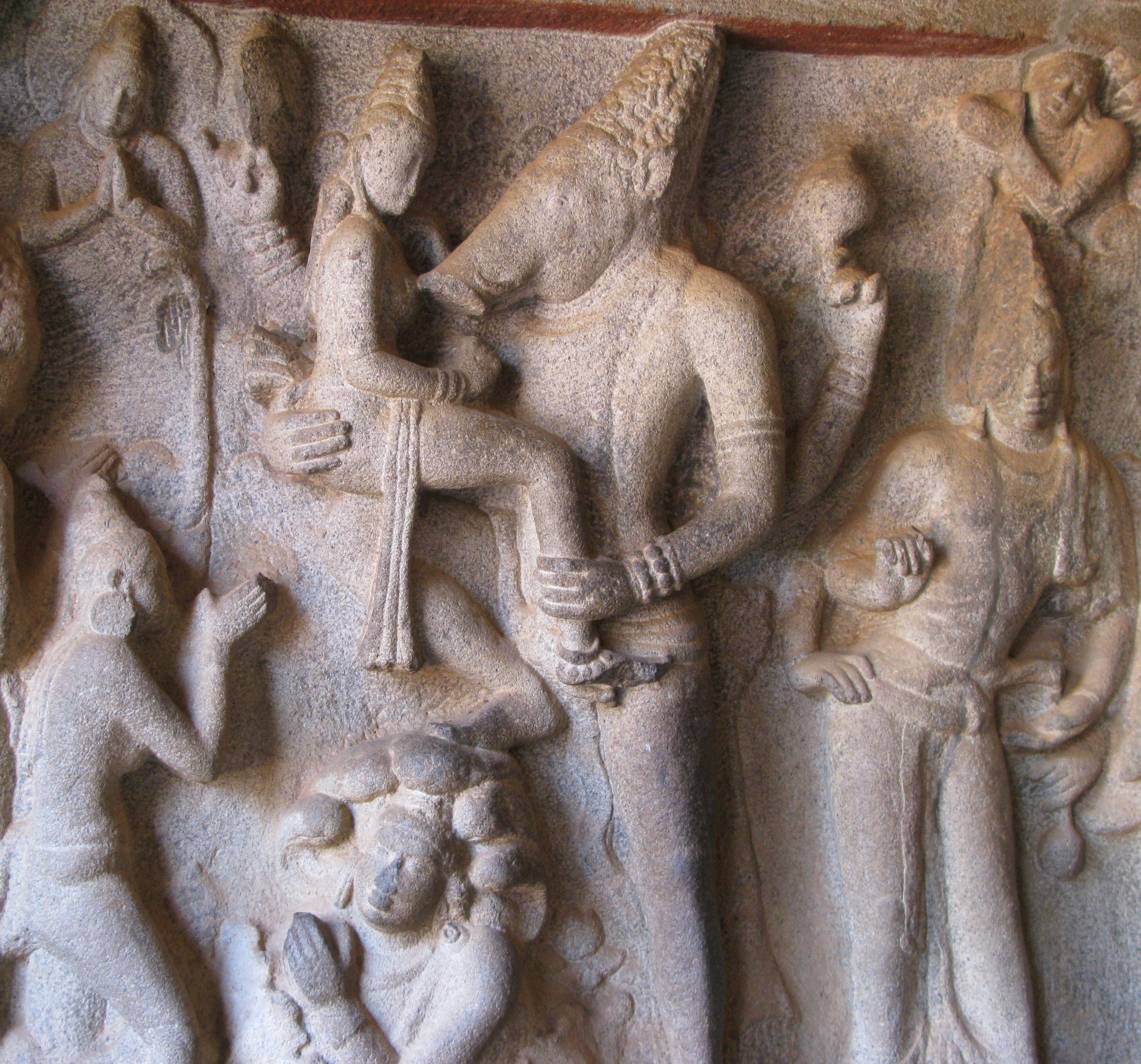
Varaha panel in Mahabalipuram dating 7th century.

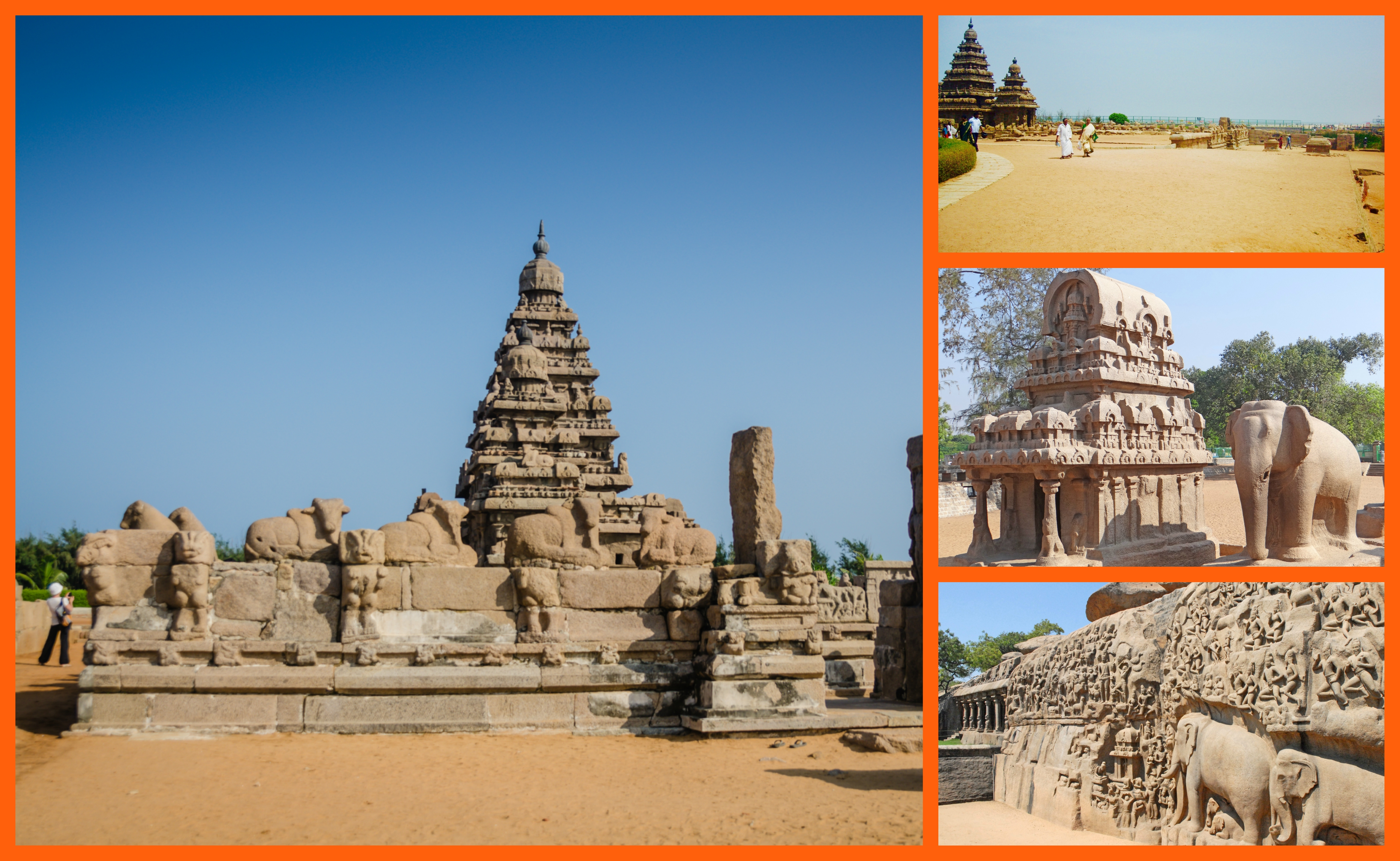
Group of Monuments at Mahabalipuram, Pallava architecture

The Pallavas ruled from 600 CE to 900 CE and their greatest constructed accomplishments are the single rock temples in Mahabalipuram and their capital Kanchipuram, now located in Tamil Nadu.

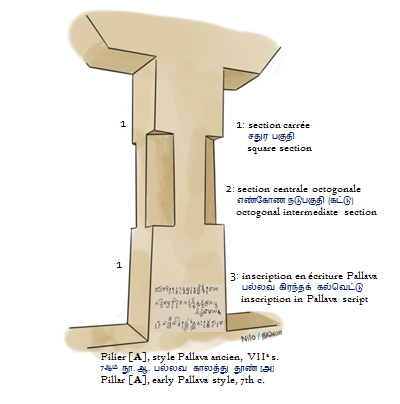
Pallava Pillar Mandagappattu, 7th century CE

Pallava art and architecture represent an early stage of Dravidian art and architecture which blossomed to its fullest extent under the Chola Dynasty. The first stone and mortar temples of South India were constructed during Pallava rule and were based on earlier brick and timber prototypes.

The earliest examples of Pallava constructions are rock-cut temples dating from 610 to 690 CE and structural temples between 690 and 900 CE. A number of rock-cut cave temples bear the inscription of the Pallava king, Mahendravarman I and his successors. The greatest accomplishments of the Pallava architecture are the rock-cut Group of Monuments at Mahabalipuram at Mahabalipuram, a UNESCO World Heritage Site, including the Sthalasayana Perumal Temple and Shore Temple. This group includes both excavated pillared halls, with no external roof except the natural rock, and monolithic shrines where the natural rock is entirely cut away and carved to give an external roof. Pallava sculptors later graduated to free-standing structural shrines which inspired Chola temples of a later age. Some of the best examples of Pallava art and architecture are the Vaikunta Perumal Temple at Kanchipuram, the Shore Temple and the Pancha Rathas of Mahabalipuram. Akshara was the greatest sculptor of their time.

== Pandyan architecture ==
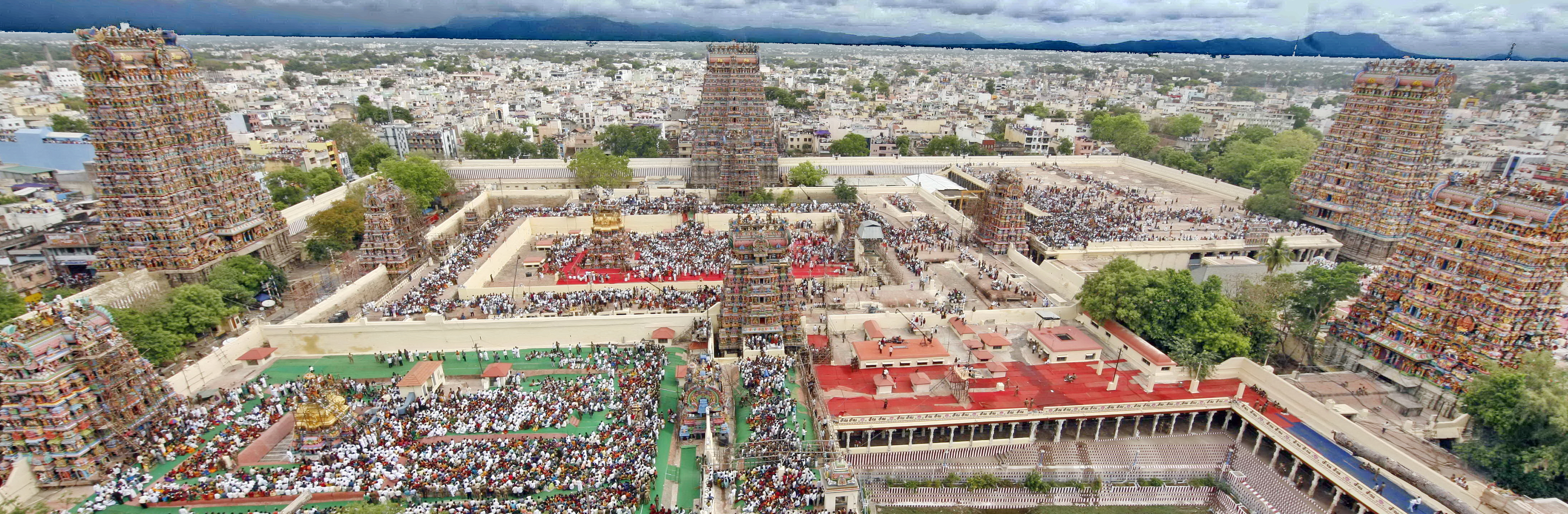
An aerial view of the Meenakshi Amman Temple

After the close of the Sangam age, the first Pandyan empire was established by Kadungon in the 6th century CE by defeating the Kalabhras, The empire ruled from 6th to 10th century CE.

Rock cut and structural temples are significant part of pandyan architecture. The Vimana and mandapa are some of the features of the early Pandyan temples. Groups of small temples are seen at Tiruchirappalli district of Tamil Nadu. The Shiva temples have a Nandi bull sculpture in front of the maha mandapa. In the later stages of Pandyas rule, finely sculptured idols, gopurams on the vimanas were developed. Gopurams are the rectangular entrance and portals of the temples. Meenakshi Amman Temple in Madurai, Kallalagar temple in Alagar Koyil and Srivilliputhur Andal Temple in Srivilliputhur were built during the reign of the Pandyas.

=== Kallalagar temple ===
Kallalagar Temple (Kallazhagar Temple) is a Hindu temple dedicated to Vishnu in Alagar Koyil, a village in Madurai district. Constructed in the Dravidian style, the temple is glorified in the Naalayira Divya Prabandham, the early medieval Tamil canon of the Alvar saints from the 6th–9th centuries CE. It is one of the 108 Divya Desams dedicated to Vishnu, who is worshiped as Kallalagar, and his consort Lakshmi as Thirumagal. This temple is called as Thirumaliruncholai in Sangam literatures and Naalayira Divya Prabandham sung by Tamil Alvar saints. A granite wall surrounds the temple, enclosing all its shrines. The temple has a seven-tiered rajagopuram. The temple is surrounded by a large fort, part of which is dilapidated.

The famous Vaishnava works in Tamil, belonging to the early 4th to 6th centuries point that to this temple as a Vishnu temple. The Sangam age belonging to (500 BCE to 300 CE), points out to this temple as a Vishnu temple. Paripāṭal and Silapadikaram mention this temple in most poetic terms.

=== Srivilliputhur Andal Temple ===
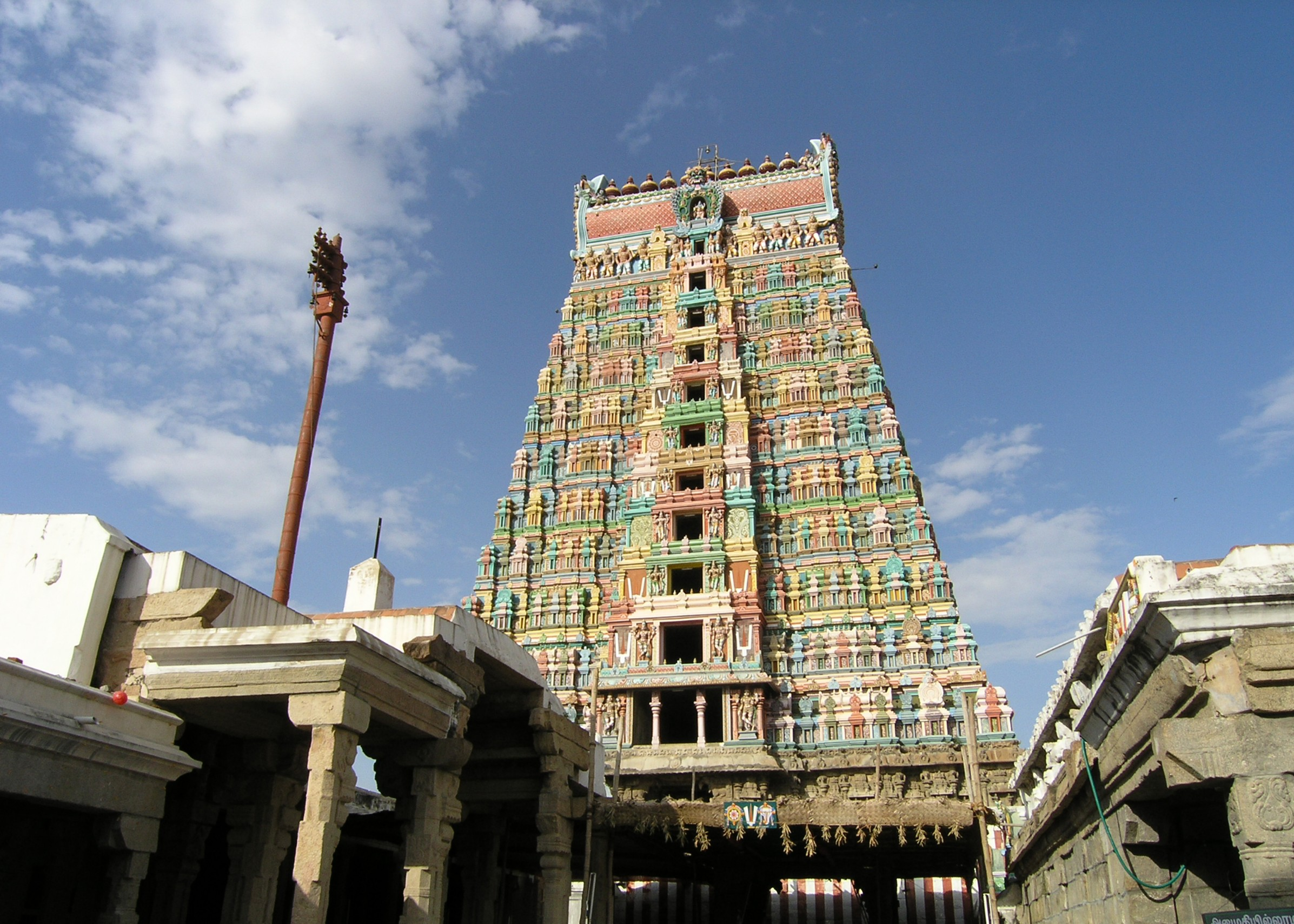
Srivilliputhur Andal Temple, Pandyan architecture, 7th century CE

The Srivilliputhur Andal Temple in Srivilliputhur, a town in the Virudhunagar district, located 80 km (50 mi) from Madurai, is dedicated to the Hindu god Vishnu. Constructed in the Dravidian style, the temple is glorified in the Nalayira Divya Prabandham, the early medieval Tamil canon of the Alvar saints from the 6th–9th centuries CE. It is one of the 108 Divya Desams dedicated to Vishnu, who is worshipped as Vatapatrasayi and his consort Lakshmi as Andal. It is believed to be the birthplace of two of the Alvars, namely Periyalvar and his foster-daughter, Andal. The history of Srivilliputhur centres around the Srivilliputhur Andal Temple, dedicated to Andal. It is argued that the temple of Vatapatrasayi is present from the 5th century, but there are epigraphic records are available only from the 9th century CE. The view that the Andal temple was built during the 14th century is highly debated. The temple has inscriptions from Chola, Pandya and Vijayanagar Nayakkar Kings, spanning across various centuries from the 10th to 16th centuries. As per some accounts, the original structure was constructed by Tribuvana Chakravarthy Konerinmai Kondan Kulasekaran and the Andal temple and 59-metre (194 ft) Rajagopura was built by Barathi Rayar of Vijayanagar king.

=== Kalugumalai temples of Pandyas ===
The temples in Kalugumalai, are located on a rocky hill in the Thoothukudi district. Kalugumalai houses the 8th century Jain Beds, Vettuvan Koil and Kalugasalamoorthy Temple, a Murugan temple at the foothills. The rock-cut temples, sculptures and the carvings are exemplary of early Pandyan architecture. The Jain beds are dedicated to the Jain and Hindu religious figures. Constructed in rock cut style, the unfinished temple was built during the reign of Pandyan king Parantaka Nedunjadaiya (768–800 CE).

There are approximately 150 niches in the bed, that includes images of Gomateshwara, Parshvanatha and other Tirthankaras of the Jainism.

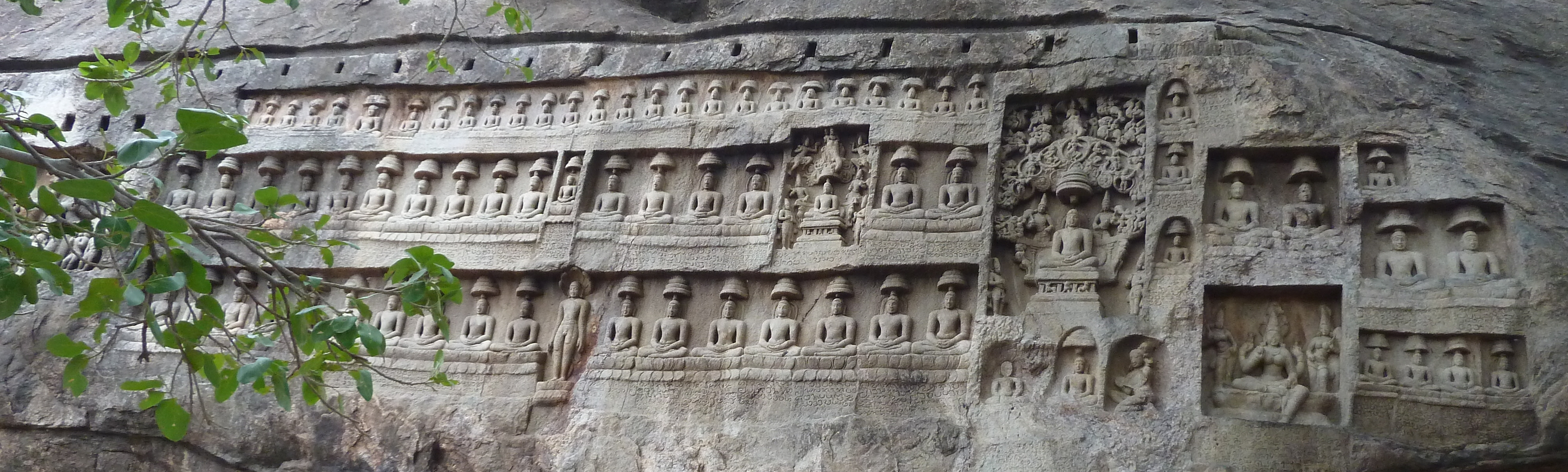
Kalugumalai Jain Beds, Pandyan architecture, 768–800 CE

The carvings in the Vettuvan Koil show the top portion of the temple, with an unfinished bottom. The sculptures and the carvings are indicative of Pandyan art during the period. The granite rock looks like a blooming lotus, with hills surrounding it on three sides. The vimana (ceiling over the sanctum) has niches of Parsavadevatas, the attendant deities of Shiva, like ganas, Dakshinamurthy depicted playing a mridanga, Siva with his consort Uma, dancers, various niches of Nandi (the sacred bull of Shiva) and animals like monkeys and lions. Historian Sivaramamurti believes that this is the only place where Dakshinamurthy is depicted playing the Mridanga (a percussion instrument), while in all other places, he is depicted playing Veena. Epigrapher like V. Vedachalam believes that there is a spontaneity in the sculptures indicating of natural human movements like in the Shiva and Uma sculpture where they seem to be talking like common folks.

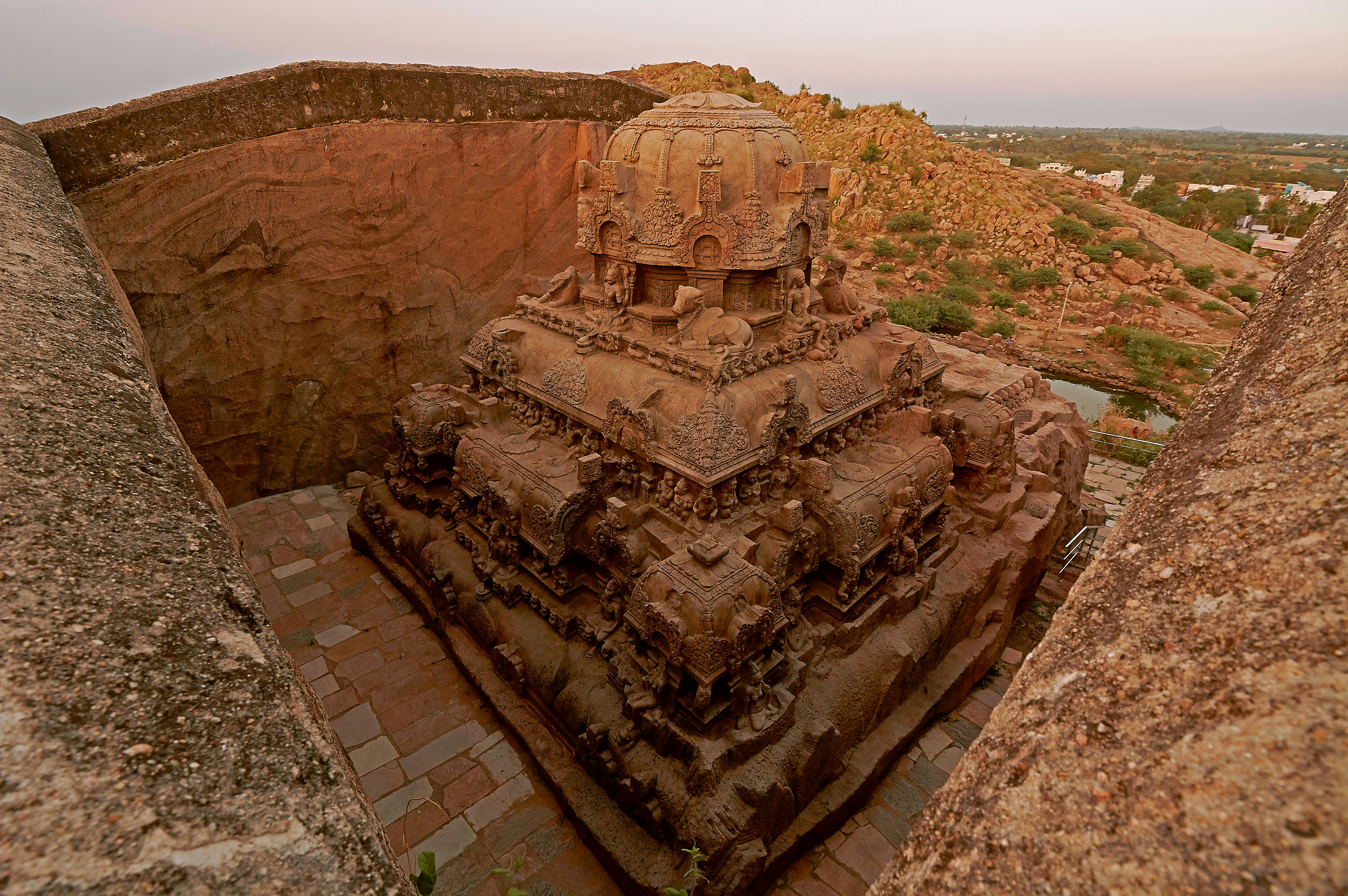
Vettuvan Koil in Kalugumalai, Pandyan architecture, 8th century CE

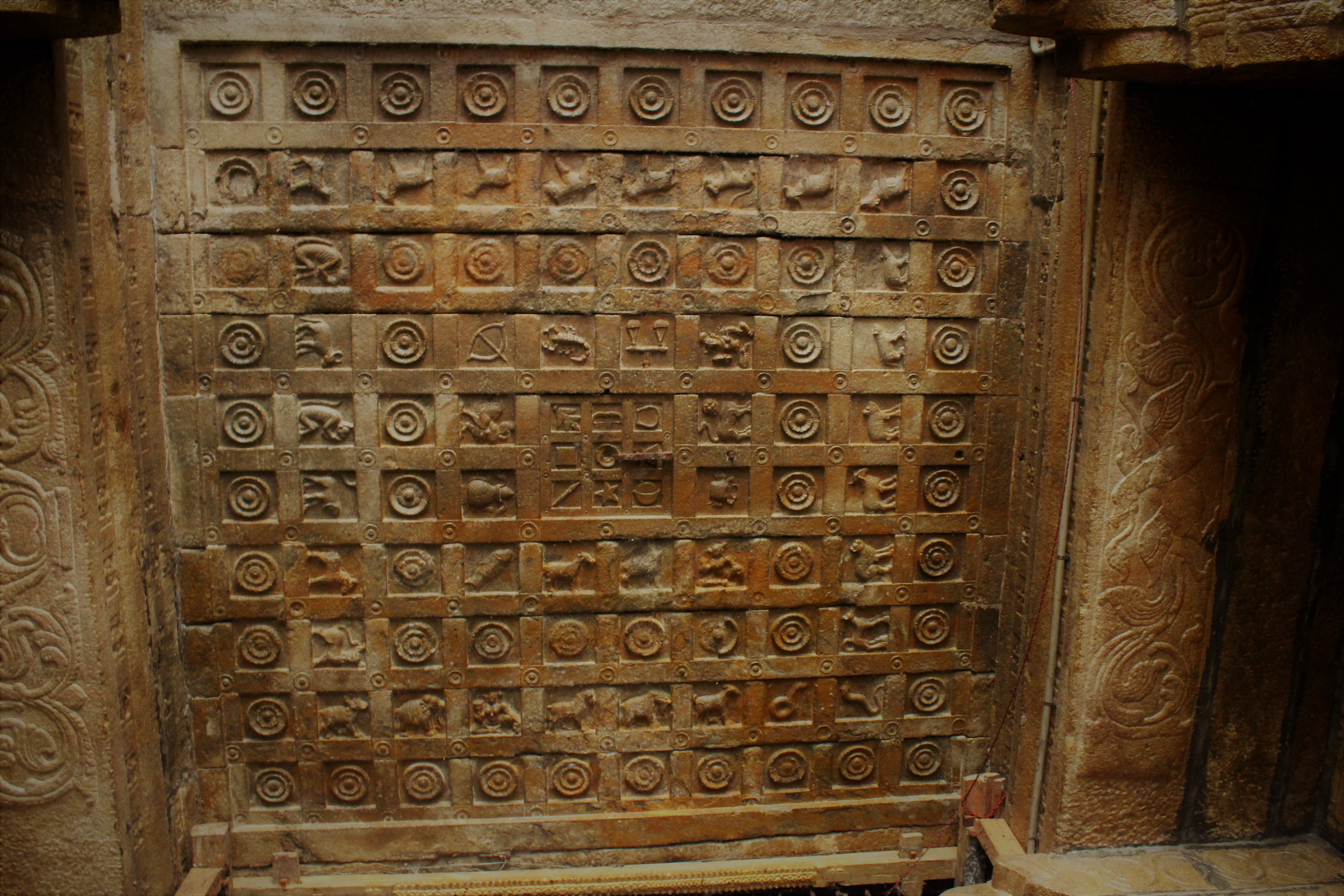
Sculpture on the ceiling of the Kalugasalamoorthy temple, Pandyan architecture, 8th century CE

The sanctum of the Kalugasalamoorthy temple is approached through a pillared hall near the gateway. The temple tank is located outside the temple. The sanctum is built in a rock-cut cave, which houses the image of Murugan in the form of Kazhugachalamurthi in seated posture. The sanctum faces west and the image of the presiding deity is 1.2 metres (4 feet) tall. The image is sported with six hands with one of them holding Vel (divine spear), his left leg over the shoulder of the peacock and right is left hanging. There are separate shrines of his consorts Valli facing South and Deivanai facing North. There is a separate shrine for Shiva and Parvathi and all the Parsvatah Devatas (attendant deities) associated with Shiva temples. Usually in Murugan temples, his vehicle peacock would be heading towards his right, but it is sported on to the left of Murugan in this temple. It is believed that Indra, the king of celestial deities, appeared as peacock to worship Murugan. The image of the peacock is hence covered during the festivals.

== Chola architecture ==
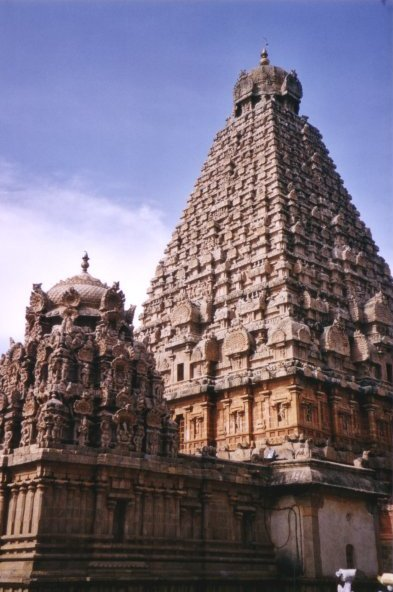
Detail of the main vimanam (tower) of the Brihadisvara Temple, Chola architecture, 1009 CE

The Chola kings ruled from 848 to 1280 CE and included Rajaraja Chola I and his son Rajendra Chola who built temples such as the Brihadeshvara Temple of Thanjavur and Brihadeshvara Temple of Gangaikonda Cholapuram, the Airavatesvara Temple of Darasuram and the Sarabeswara (Shiva) Temple, also called the Kampahareswarar Temple at Thirubhuvanam, the last two temples being located near Kumbakonam. The first three among the above four temples are titled Great Living Chola Temples among the UNESCO World Heritage Sites.

The Cholas were prolific temple builders right from the times of the first king Vijayalaya Chola after whom the eclectic chain of Vijayalaya Chozhisvaram temple near Narttamalai exists. These are the earliest specimen of Dravidian temples under the Cholas. His son Aditya I built several temples around the Kanchi and Kumbakonam regions. The Varadharajaperumal temple, Thirubuvanai which was built by Chola king Parantaka I (907-955 CE) and was called Veeranarayana Vinnagar. The temple has sculptures of Ramayana and the legend of Vamana mentioned in the Rig Veda, Yajur veda, Sama veda, Ramayana, Mahabharatha, Brihadaranyaka Upanishad and many more texts. An inscription dated to the 30th regnal year of Rajadhiraja I (c. 1048 CE), mentions teaching Rig Veda, Yajur Veda, Chandogasama, Talavakrasama, Apurva, Vajnasaneya, Bodhayaniya Sathashatandha Sutra and explanations of sastras. There are inscriptions in the temple from the period of Rajadhiraja Chola indicating recital of Tiruvaymoli, the famous works of the Alvar saint Nammalvar.

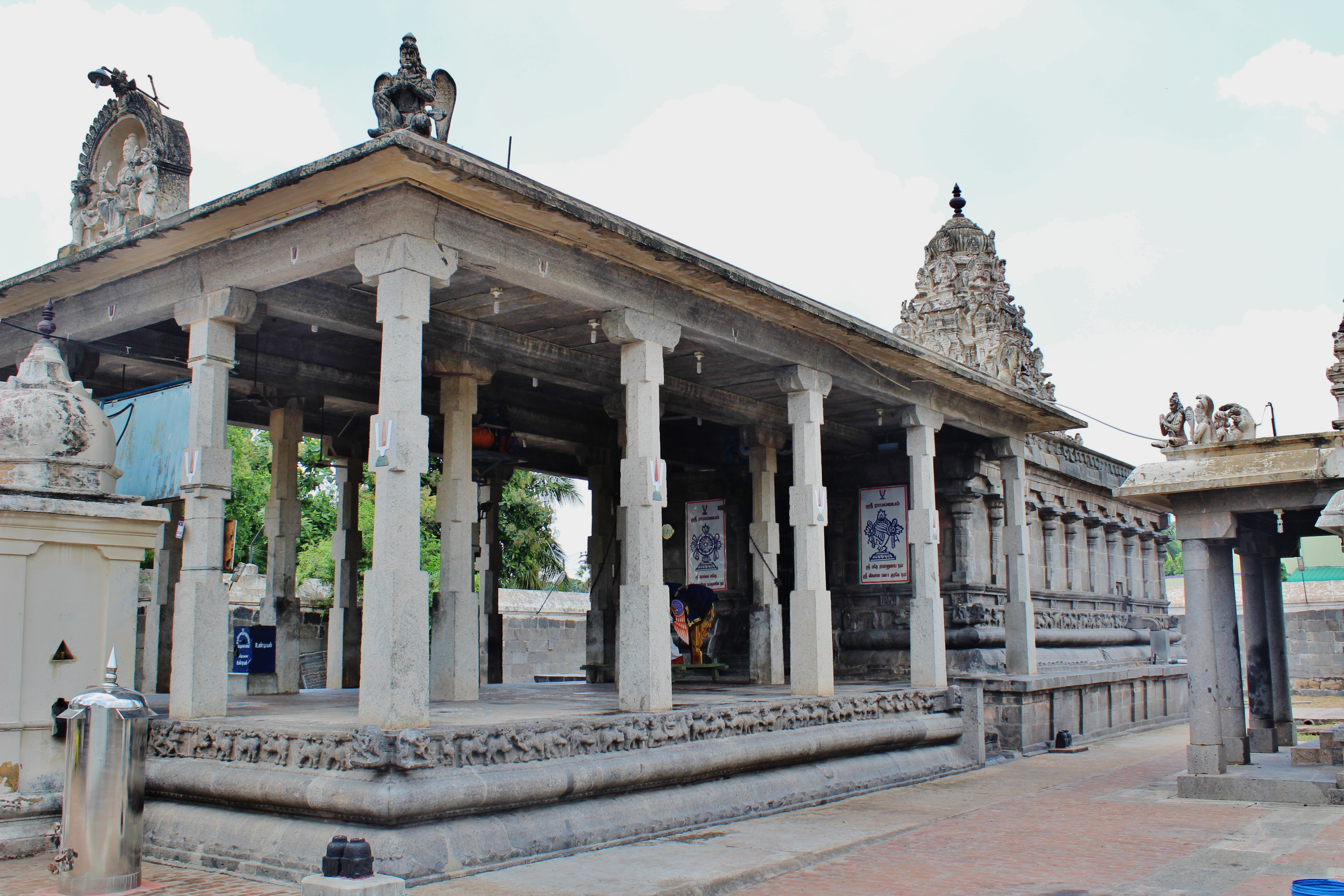
View of the Varadarajaperumal temple at Thirubuvanai.

Temple building received great impetus from the conquests and the genius of Aditya I Parantaka I, Sundara Chola, Rajaraja Chola and his son Rajendra Chola I. Rajendra Chola I built the Rajaraja Temple at Thanjavur after his own name. The maturity and grandeur to which the Chola architecture had evolved found expression in the two temples of Tanjavur and Gangaikondacholapuram. He also proclaimed himself as Gangaikonda. In a small portion of the Kaveri belt between Tiruchy-Tanjore-Kumbakonam, at the height of their power, the Cholas have left over 2300 temples, with the Tiruchy-Thanjavur belt itself boasting of more than 1500 temples. The magnificent Siva temple of Thanjavur built by Raja Raja I in 1009 as well as the Brihadisvara Temple of Gangaikonda Cholapuram, completed around 1030, are both fitting memorials to the material and military achievements of the time of the two Chola emperors. The largest and tallest of all Indian temples of its time, the Tanjore Brihadisvara is at the apex of South Indian architecture. In fact, two succeeding Chola kings Raja Raja II and Kulothunga III built the Airavatesvara Temple at Darasuram and the Kampahareswarar Siva Temple at Tribhuvanam respectively, both temples being on the outskirts of Kumbakonam around 1160 and 1200 CE. All the four temples were built over a period of nearly 200 years reflecting the glory, prosperity and stability under the Chola emperors.

Contrary to popular impression, the Chola emperors patronized and promoted construction of a large number of temples that were spread over most parts of the Chola empire. These include 40 of the 108 Vaishnava Divya Desams out of which 77 are found spread most of South India and others in Andhra and North India. In fact, the Sri Ranganathaswamy Temple in Srirangam, which is the biggest temple in India and the Chidambaram Natarajar Temple (though originally built by the Pallavas but possibly seized from the Cholas of the pre-Christian era when they ruled from Kanchi) were two of the most important temples patronized and expanded by the Cholas and from the times of the second Chola King Aditya I, these two temples have been hailed in inscriptions as the tutelary deities of the Chola Kings.

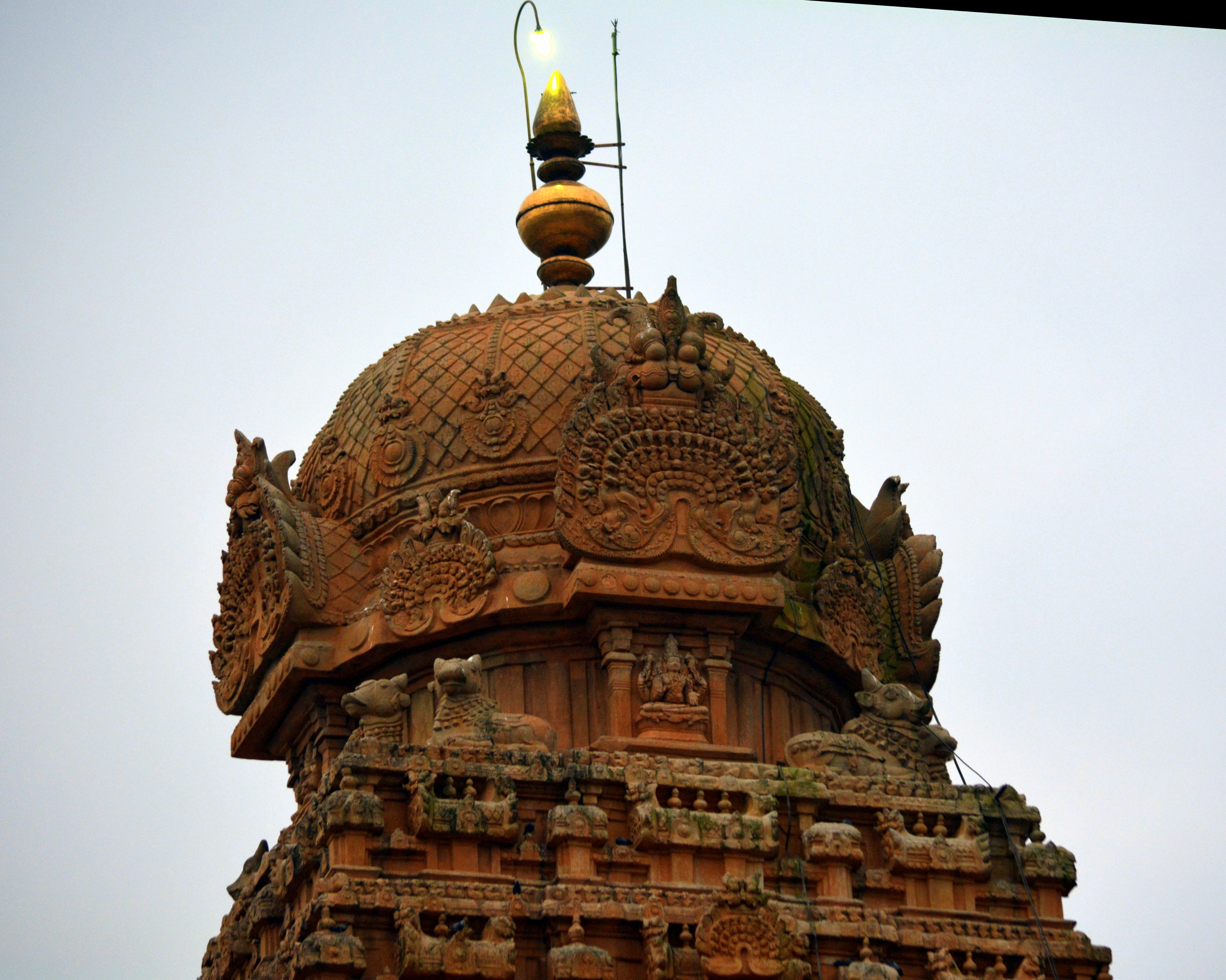
The sikhara of Brihadisvara Temple, a cupolic dome (25 tons), is octagonal and rests on a single block of granite, weighing 80 tons

Temple shrine on the Koneswaram temple promontory extremity and the Ketheeswaram temple and Munneswaram temple compounds contained tall gopuram towers by Chola rule of Trincomalee, Mannar, Puttalam and Chidambaram's expansion that escalated the building of those syncretic latter styles of Dravidian architecture seen across the continent pictured.

Of course, the two Brihadisvara Temples at Thanjavur and Gangaikonda Cholapuram as well as the other two Siva temples, namely the Airavatesvara Temple of Darasuram and the Sarabeswara (Shiva) Temple which is also popular as the Kampahareswarar Temple at Thirubhuvanam, both on the outskirts of Kumbakonam were the royal temples of the Cholas to commemorate their innumerable conquests and subjugation of their rivals from other parts of South India, Deccan Ilangai or Sri Lanka and the Narmada-Mahanadi-Gangetic belts. But the Chola emperors underlined their non-partisan approach to religious

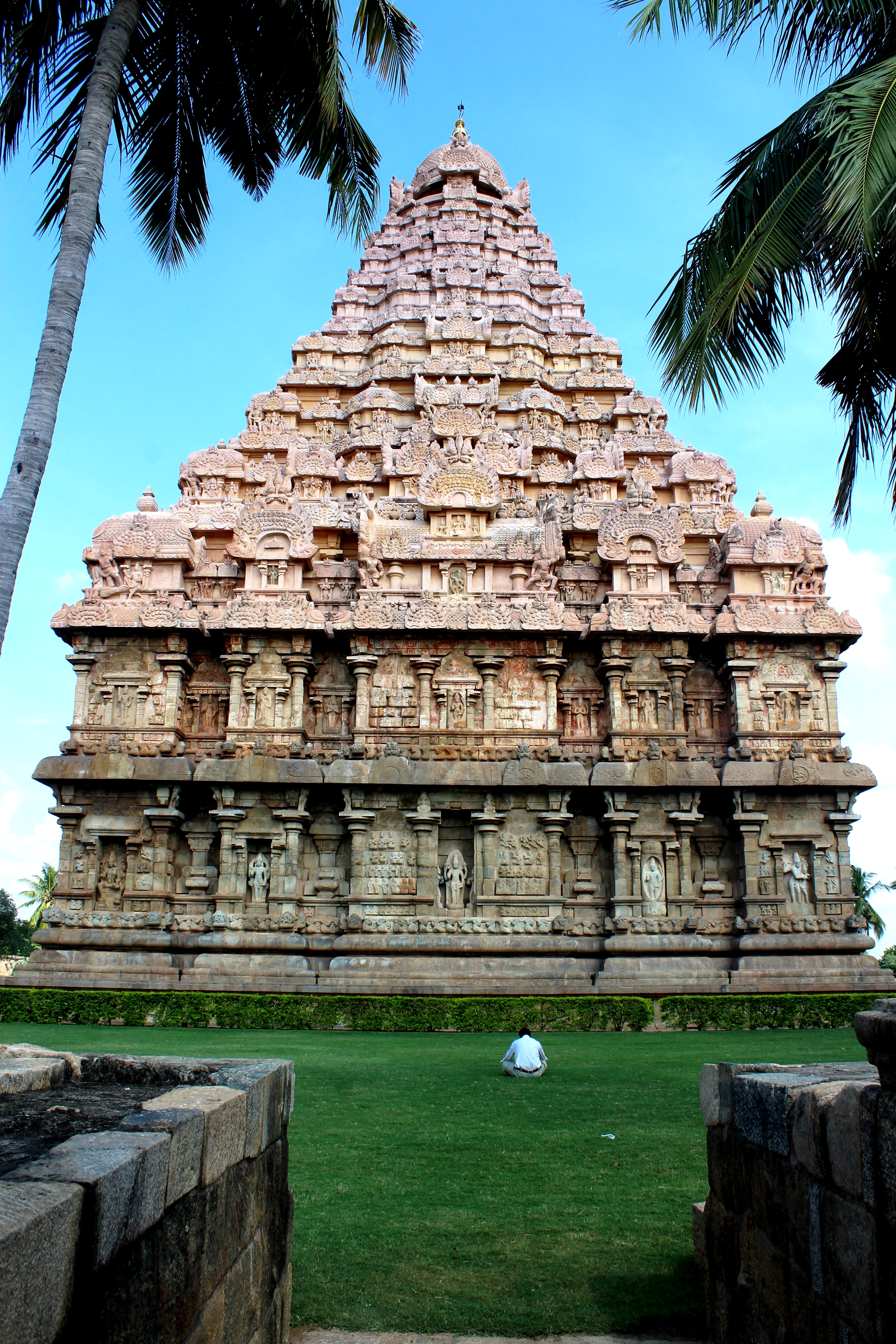
Back view of Raja gopuram, Brihadisvara Temple, Gangaikonda Cholapuram, Chola architecture

iconography and faith by treating the presiding deities of their other two peerless creations, namely the Ranganathaswamy Temple dedicated to Lord Vishnu at Srirangam and the Nataraja Temple at Chidambaram which actually is home to the twin deities of Siva and Vishnu (as the reclining Govindarajar) to be their 'Kuladheivams' or tutelary (or family) deities. The Cholas also preferred to call only these two temples which home their tutelary or family deities as Koil or the 'Temple', which denotes the most important places of worship for them, underlining their eq. The above-named temples are being proposed to be included among the UNESCO World Heritage Sites, which will elevate them to the exacting and exalting standards of the Great Living Chola Temples.

The temple of Gangaikondacholapuram, the creation of Rajendra Chola I, was intended to exceed its predecessor in every way. Completed around 1030, only two decades after the temple at Thanjavur and in much the same style, the greater elaboration in its appearance attests the more affluent state of the Chola Empire under Rajendra. This temple has a larger Siva linga than the one at Thanjavur but the Vimana of this temple is smaller in height than the Thanjavur vimana.

The Chola period is also remarkable for its sculptures and bronzes all over the world. Among the existing specimens in museums around the world and in the temples of South India may be seen many fine figures of Siva in various forms, such as Vishnu and his consort Lakshmi, and the Siva saints. Though conforming generally to the iconographic conventions established by long tradition, the sculptors worked with great freedom in the 11th and the 12th centuries to achieve a classic grace and grandeur. The best example of this can be seen in the form of Nataraja the Divine Dancer.

== Vijayanagara and Nayak architecture ==
=== Krishnapuram Venkatachalapathy Perumal temple ===
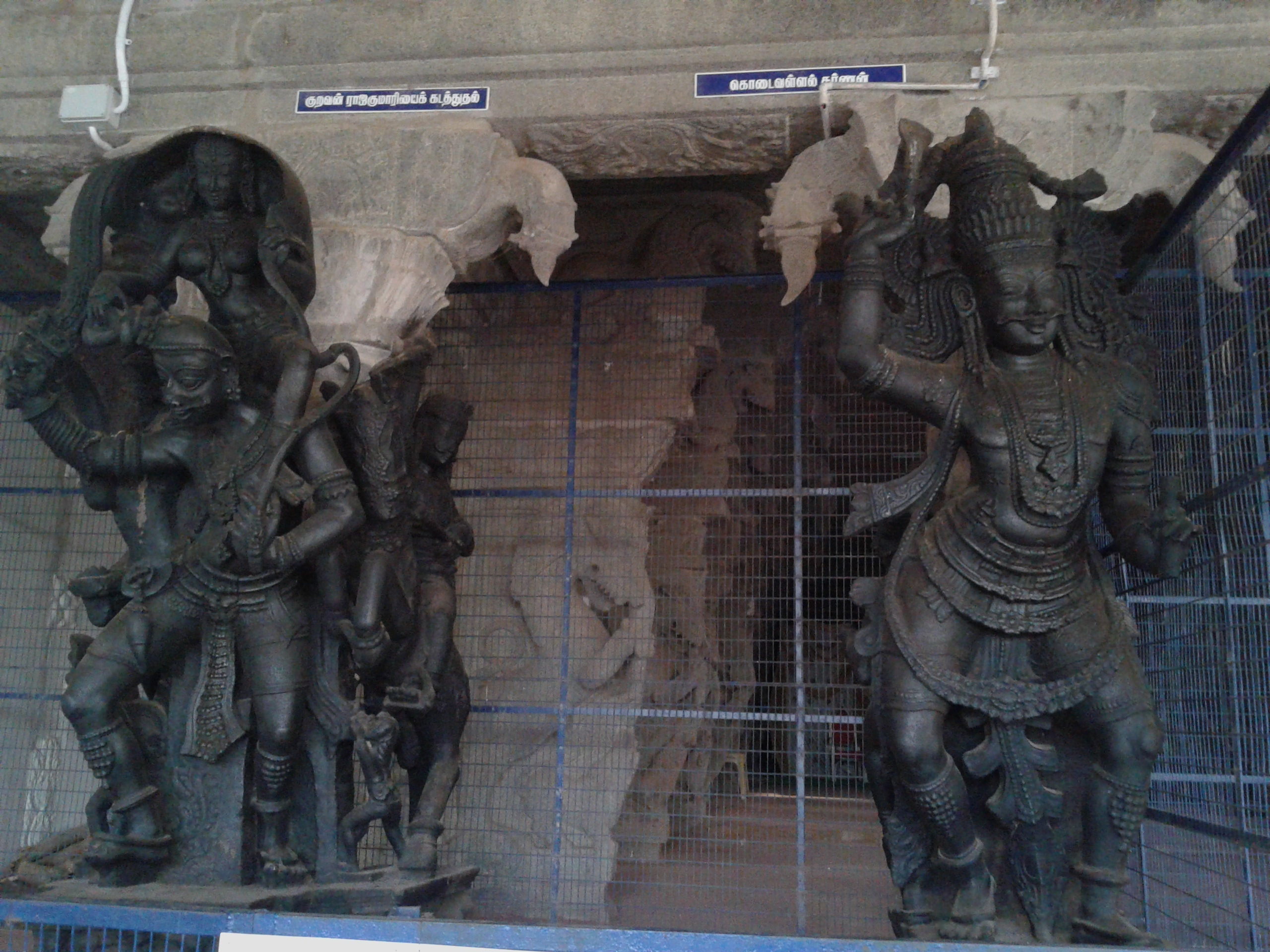
Sculptures in the Krishnapuram Venkatachalapathy temple.

Krishnapuram Venkatachalapathy temple, (also called Krishnapuram Temple) in Krishnapuram, a village in the Tirunelveli district, located 10 km (6.2 mi) from Tirunelveli, is dedicated to Vishnu. Constructed in the Dravidian style, the temple is a storehouse of Nayak architecture. A granite wall surrounds the temple complex, enclosing all its shrines. The temple has a five tiered Rajagopuram. The Vijayanagar and Nayak kings commissioned pillared halls and major shrines of the temple during the 16th century.There are many halls in the temple namely the Pandal mantap, Vahana mandap, Ranga Mandap an Nanguneri Jeeyar mandap. The Pandal mandap has pillars replete with architectural features displaying pushpaboikai, palagai, and varikolam. The Unjal mandap is designed to accommodate the swing for the festival deities. The square shaped Vasantha mandap has Navarang style. The temple houses rare sculptures from the Nayak period in the Veerappa Nayak Mandap. There are exquisite carvings in the pillars and life size images indicating various legends of Hindu Puranas. The Jeeyar mandap houses lot of pillars with images of ladies hold lamps as in Kerala temples. The seer of temples used to rest at this place during festivals. The Sorga vasal (gateway to heaven) is located to the west of Yagasalai Mandap and is open only during the ten-day Vaikunta Ekadasi festival. Manimandap has numerous pillars with sculptures of elephants and yalis. The composite columns of Virabhadra holding sword and horn are found be additions of the Vijayanayagara kings during the early 1500s. Similar columns of Virabhadra are found in Adikesava Perumal Temple at Thiruvattaru, Meenakshi Temple at Madurai, Nellaiappar Temple at Tirunelveli, Kasi Viswanathar temple at Tenkasi, Ramanathaswamy Temple at Rameswaram, Soundararajaperumal temple at Thadikombu, Srivilliputhur Andal temple, Srivaikuntanathan Permual temple at Srivaikuntam, Avudayarkovil, Vaishnava Nambi and Thirukurungudivalli Nachiar temple at Thirukkurungudi.

=== Vellore Fort ===
Vellore Fort was built by Chinna Bommi Reddy and Thimma Reddy Nayak, subordinate chieftains under Sadasiva Raya of the Vijayanagara Empire in the year of 1566 CE. It is mentioned that "there is no such fort on the face of earth like the one in Vellore. It had a deep wet ditch (moat) where once 10,000 crocodiles swarmed, waiting to grab every intruder into this impregnable fort. It has huge double walls with bastions projecting irregularly, where two carts can be driven abreast". The fort was constructed in granite from the nearby quarries in Arcot and Chittoor districts. It spreads over an area of 54 hectares (133 acres) and is located at an altitude of 220 m (720 ft) within a broken mountain range. The fort is surrounded by a moat which was once used as an additional line of defence in the case of an invasion. It was supposed to have included an escape tunnel leading to Virinjipuram about 12 km (7.5 mi) away, which could be used by the king and other royals in the event of an attack. This report was however later disputed by researchers of the ASI who found no evidence of the existence of such a passage. The fort is considered to be among the best of military architecture in Southern India and is known for its grand ramparts, wide moat and robust masonry. The Jalakanteshwara Temple inside Vellore fort is a fine example of Vijayanagaram Architecture.The temple has exquisite carvings on its gopuram (tower), richly carved stone pillars, large wooden gates and stunning monoliths and sculptures. These Vijayanagara sculptures are similar to the ones present in Soundararajaperumal Temple, Thadikombu, Krishnapuram Venkatachalapathy temple, Srivilliputhur Divya Desam and Alagar Koyil. The Gopuram of the tower is over 100 ft. in height. The temple also has a Mandapam, with the hall supported by carved stone pillars of dragons, horses and yalis (lion like creature).

=== Thenkaraikottai ===
Thenkaraikottai is another fort built by Vijayanagara Empire. This is the only land fort present in Tamil Nadu. The site is approximately 16 hectares (40 acres) and contains a temple dedicated to Lord Rama (an avatar of Lord Vishnu) commonly known as Sri Kalyana Ramaswamy temple. The fort is said to be built by Seelappa Nayakkar and Chennappa Nayakkar of Vijayanagar dynasty to stay in this place and collect tax from the people. The temple is an other fine example of Vijayanagaram architecture apart from the Jalakanteshwara Temple. The temple is maintained by the Hindu Religious and Charitable Endowments Department of the Government of Tamil Nadu. There are few ruined historic buildings which includes Granaries, stables for elephants and horses, cannons, a bathing area for the princes, A tank for the temple, a well for the temple, A Palace hall and many more. pillars which are sculpted in a manner which can produce musical notes when struck. Tamil poet says that the pillars here are a combination of the Shruti Gana Laya types. The Mandapa has beautiful architectural representations of various forms of Vishnu and few scenes of Ramayana, Mahabharatha and Srimad Bhagavatham. There are statues of Alvars and Vaishnavate Acharyas, Vishvaksena kept in a row in the inner Mandapam of the temple similar to many other Vaishnavate temples. The inner Mandapam has four pillars with sculptures of Vishnu and his avatars. The temple also has a temple tank which is present away from the temple.

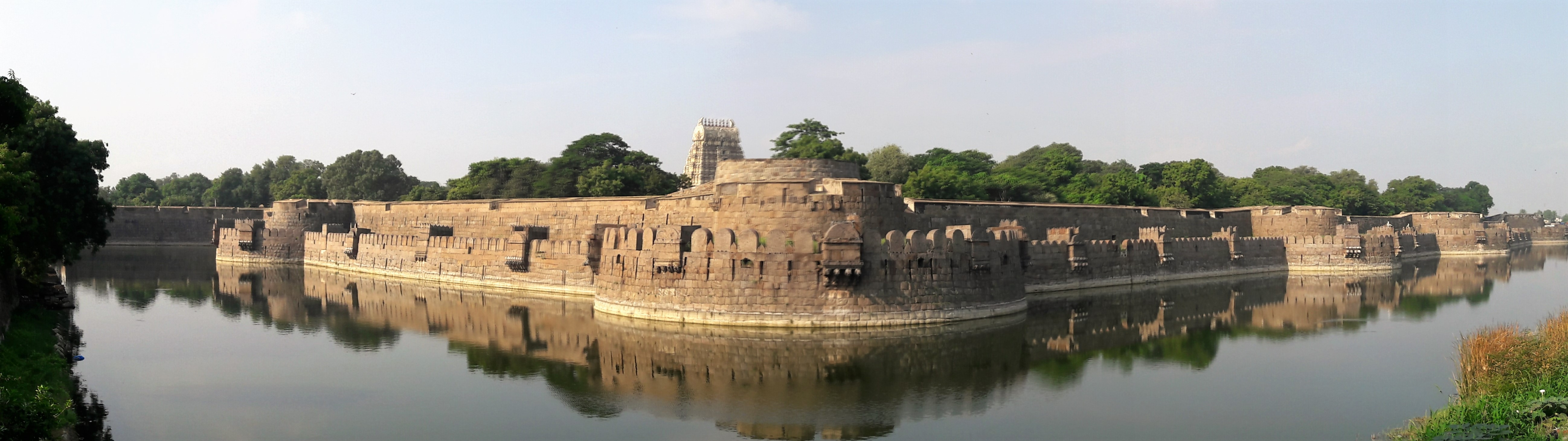
Panorama of the Vellore Fort and Jalakandeswarar temple

=== Other temples ===
The Madurai and Tanjavur Nayaks made great contributions to architectural style, the main characteristics of the style during this period being the elaborate mandapas of the "hundred-pillared" and "thousand-pillared" types, the high gopurams with stucco statues on the surface and the long corridors.

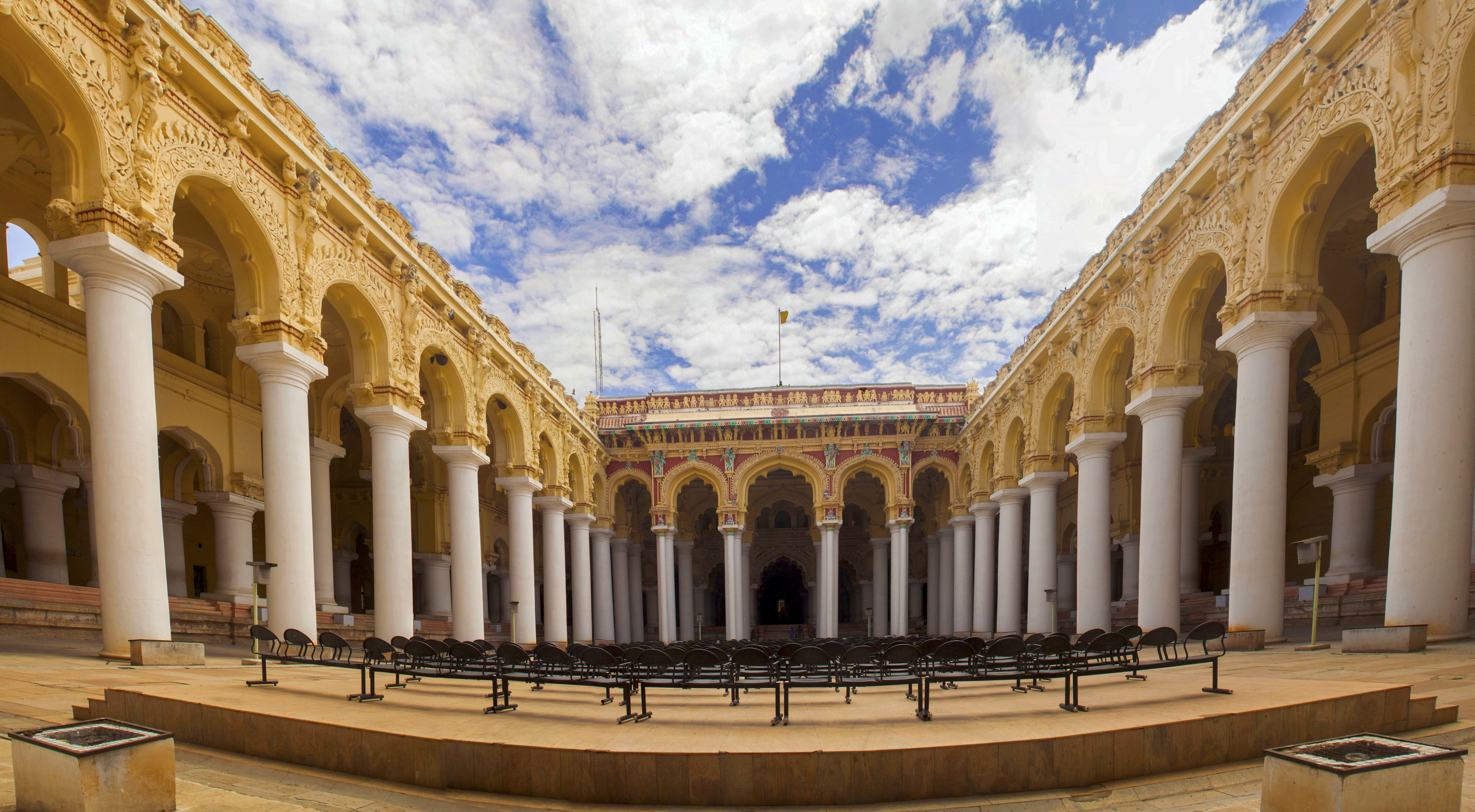
Thirumalai Nayakkar Mahal, Madurai, 1636 CE

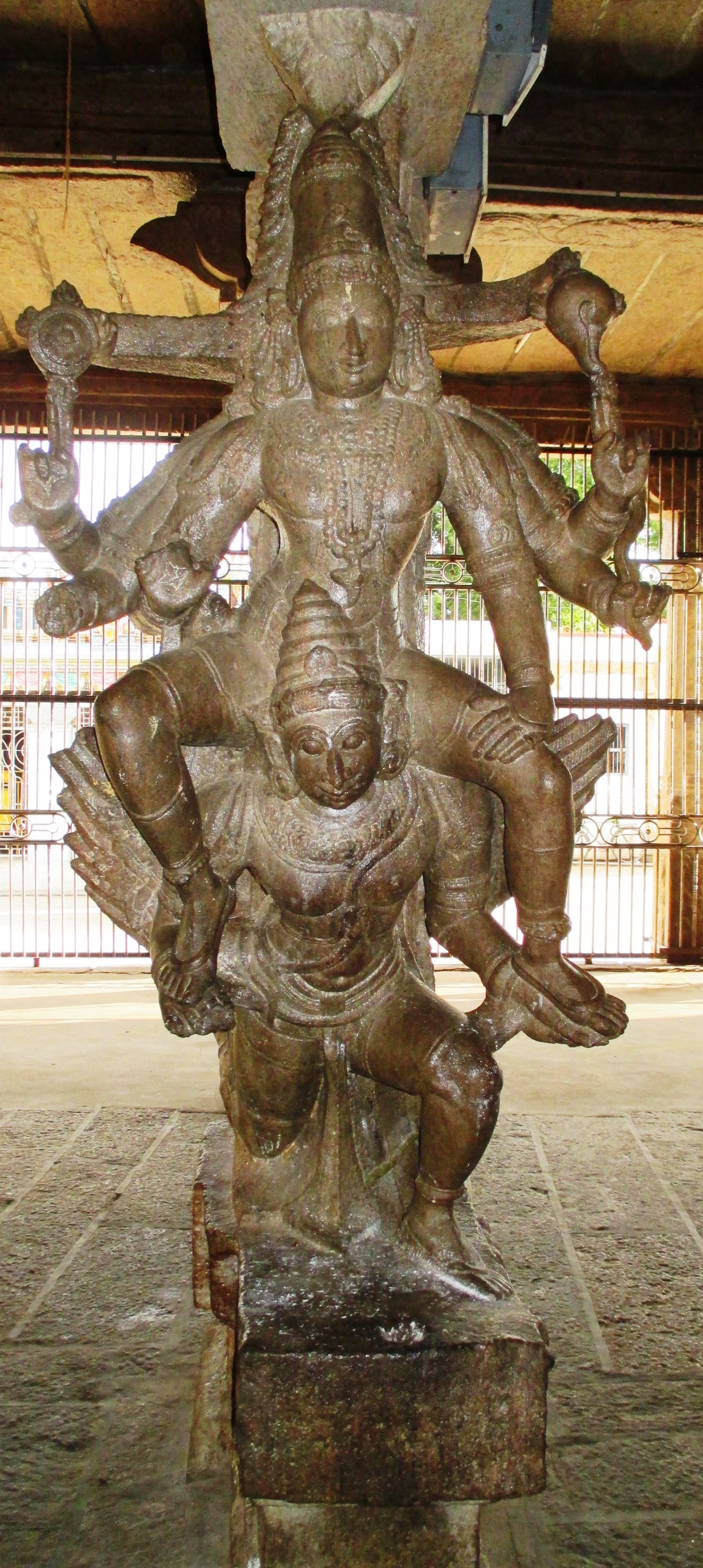
Image of Garuda carrying Vishnu at Kallazhagar temple.

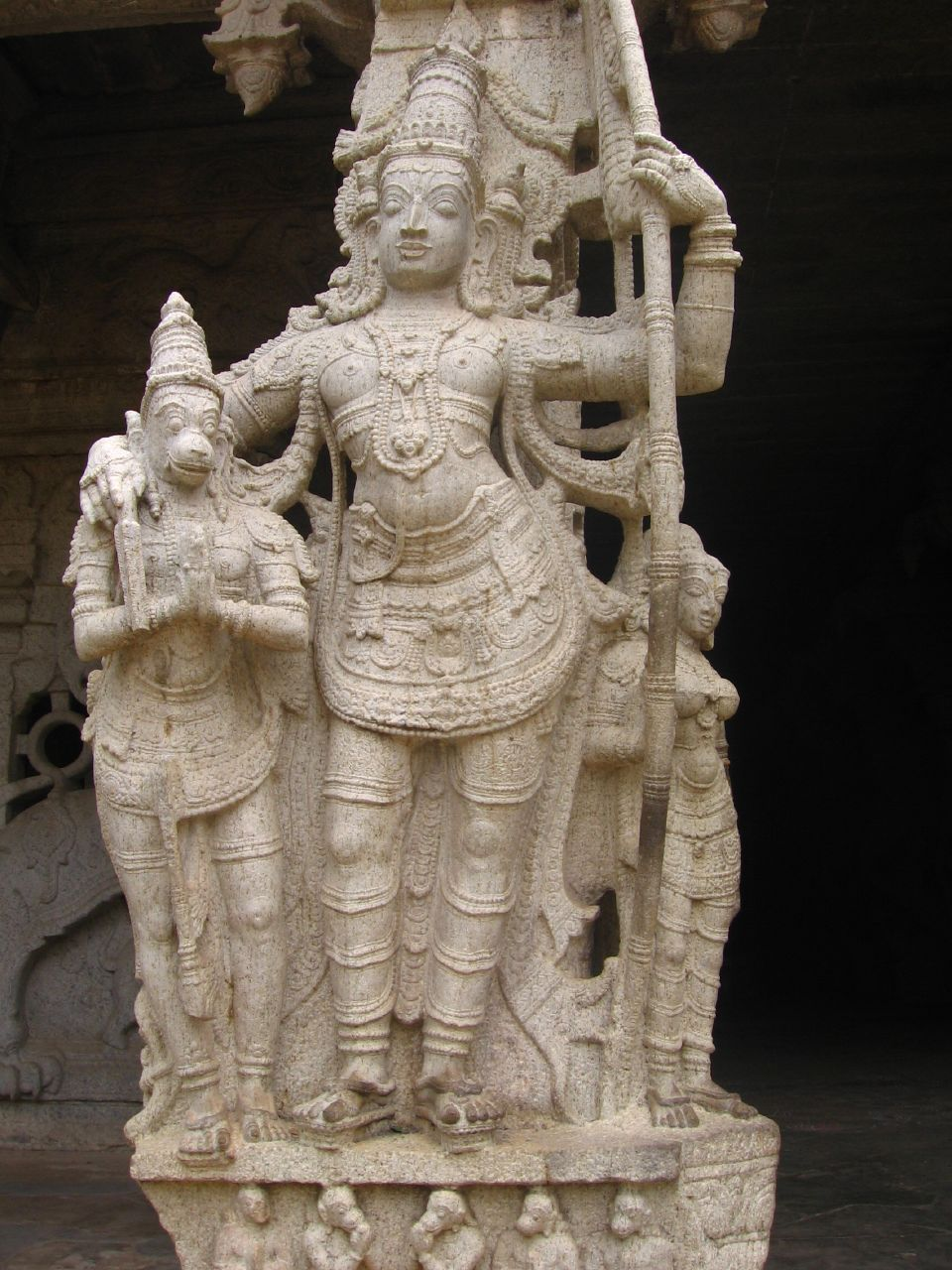
sculpture of Rama hugging Sugriva at Srivaikuntanathan Perumal temple.

The main temples representing this style are:

- The Srirangam Ranganathaswamy Perumal temple at Srirangam – noted for its increase in the number of enclosures and its "thousand-pillared" mandapam. These enclosures together

makes it the largest functioning religious complex in the world.

- The Kallalagar temple at Alagar Koyil – noted for the life size images of Maha Vishnu and his Avatars.
- The Srivaikuntanathan Perumal temple at Srivaikuntam – noted for the life size images of Agora Virabhadra and warriors. Rama is seen hugging the monkey king Sugreeva with his right hand and holding his bow in the left and on his left stands Sita, while in another pillar he is seen hugging Hanuman with his right hand and Angada seen standing in anjali.
- The temple at Rameswaram – noted for its long corridors;
- The Subramanya temple at the Brihadisvara Temple court at Tanjavur – noted for its fine vimana with ratha and maha mandapas;
- Meenakshi Temple at Madurai – noted for the great splendour its "thousand-pillared" mandapam, and the Thanga Thamarai kulam ("Golden Lotus water pool").

=== Thanjavur Maratha kingdom ===
The Thanjavur Maratha palace was originally constructed by the rulers of Thanjavur Nayak kingdom. After the fall of the Thanjavur Nayak kingdom, it served as the official residence of the Thanjavur Maratha. The palace complex consists of the Sadar Mahal Palace, the queen's courtyard and the Durbar Hall. The Royal Palace Museum contains a splendid collection of Chola bronzes. The Raja Serfoji Memorial Hall and the Royal Palace Museum are situated in the Sadar Mahal Palace. There is also a small bell tower. The Saraswathi Mahal Library is situated with the Thanjavur palace complex.

== Colonial ==
San Thome Basilica is a Roman Catholic (Latin Rite) minor basilica in Santhome, in the city of Chennai, India. It was built in the 16th century by Portuguese explorers, and rebuilt again with the status of a cathedral by the British in 1893. The Madras High Court and Government Museum in Chennai were designed by Henry Irwin.

=== Indo-Saracenic architecture ===
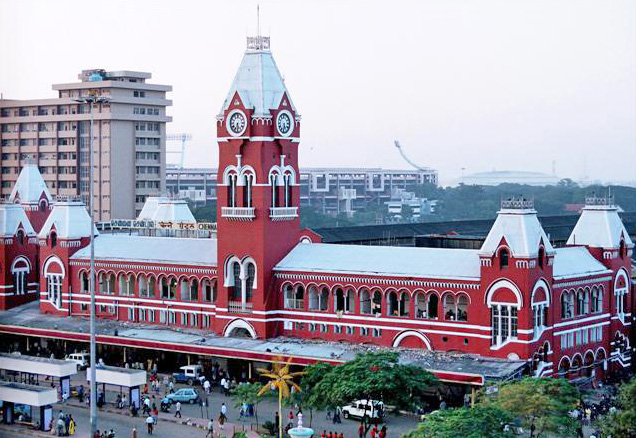
Puratchi Thalaivar Dr. M.G.Ramachandran Central Railway Station

Indo-Saracenic architecture is a type of architecture used by the British architects in India in the late 19th century and the early 20th century. It is a combination of Islamic, Hindu, and Byzantine Revival architecture. Features of Indo-Saracenic architecture include domes, arches, minarets, and stained glass. The British built many public buildings like museums, educational institutions, and railway stations using this type of architecture. Examples of Indo-Saracenic style buildings in Chennai include Madras High Court, Senate House, Chepauk Palace, and Egmore Railway station.

=== Notable buildings in Chennai ===
Many historic buildings are still fully functional and host government, business or educational establishments. Chennai is home to the second largest collection of heritage buildings in the country, after Kolkata.

==== Fort St. George ====
Built in 1639, Fort St George, used to house the Tamil Nadu Legislative Assembly and Secretariat. Tipu Sultan's cannons decorate the ramparts of the Fort's museum. The Fort has the country's tallest flagstaff at a height of 46 m (150 ft). The fort is one of the 163 notified areas (megalithic sites) in the state of Tamil Nadu.

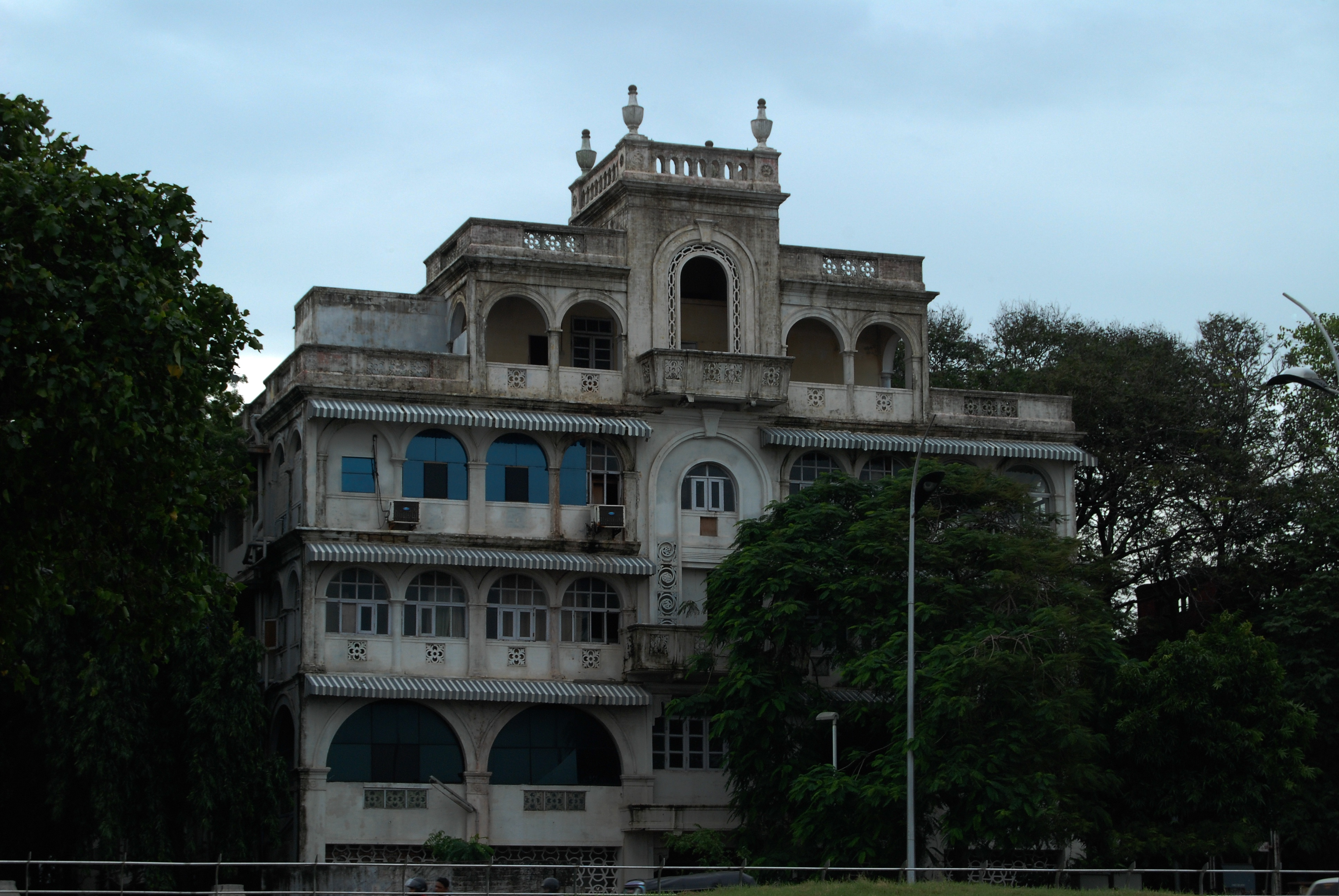
Chepauk Palace, Chennai

==== Chepauk Palace ====
Constructed in 1768, it was the first building in India constructed using the Indo-Saracenic type of architecture. It was designed by Paul Benfield, a British architect. The Chepauk Palace used to be the official residence of the Nawabs of Arcot. It has a total area of 117 acres with two blocks - Kalas Mahal and Humayun Mahal.

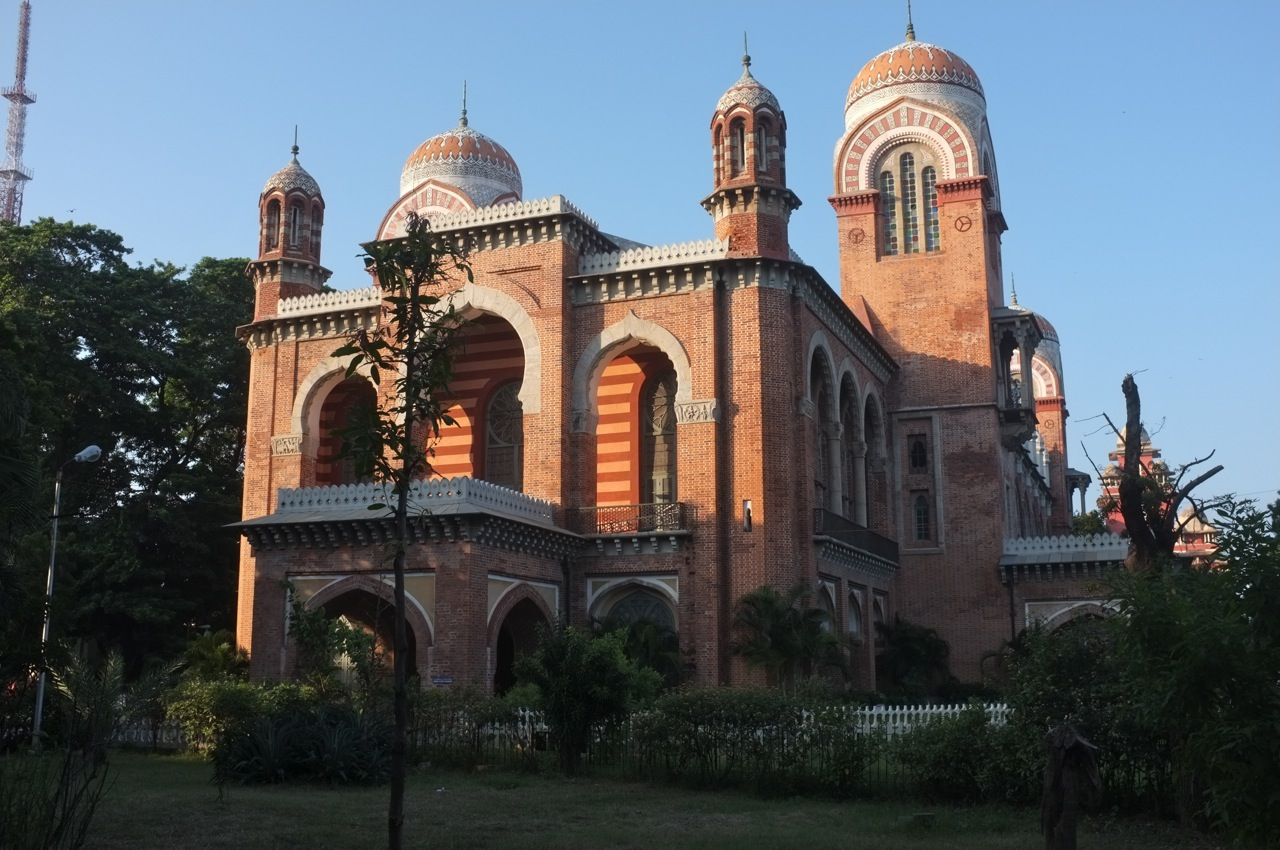
Senate House, Chennai

==== Senate House ====
Constructed in 1879 by Robert Chisholm, the Senate House is located inside the University of Madras campus and represents the Indo-Saracenic style of architecture. The main door of the Senate House opens to the Great Hall which is 46 m (150 ft) long, 18 m (60 ft) wide, and 15 m (50 ft) feet high. The first Legislative Assembly of Madras met here in 1937. University convocations were also previously held here.

==== Madras High Court ====
The Madras High Court is the second largest judicial building in the world next only to the Courts of London. It is a good example of the Indo-Saracenic style and was completed in 1892.

==== National Art Gallery ====
The Victoria Memorial Hall built in 1906 by Henry Irwin is another example of Indo-Saracenic architecture. It was initially the location of the Victoria Technical Institute, later renamed as the National Art Gallery in 1951. It had about 175 collections of paintings from Rajasthan, Deccan, Tanjore, and Raja Ravi Varma, besides many bronze, wood, and ivory items from the British era. However, the art gallery is closed since 2002 as it is being renovated.

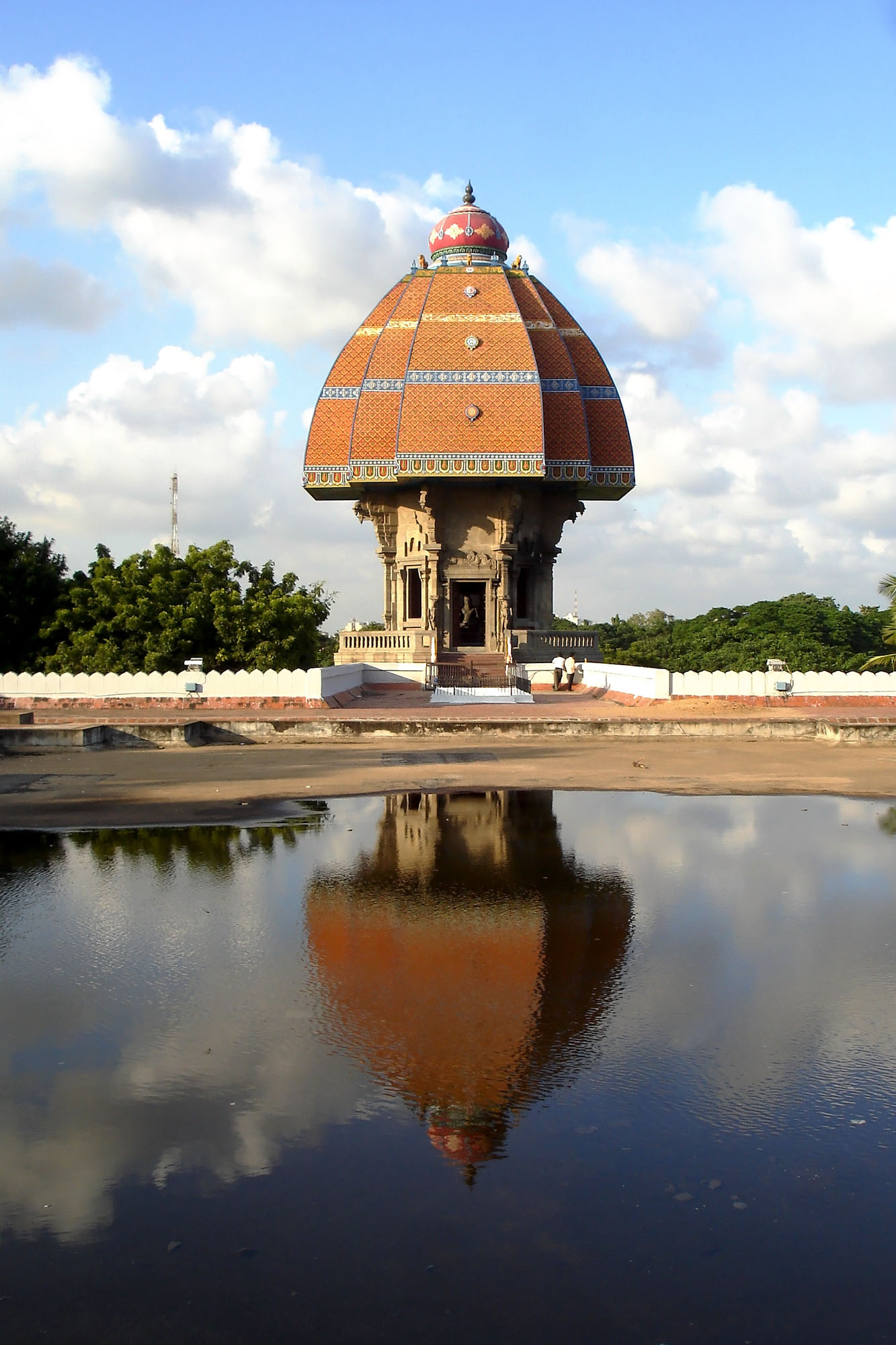
Valluvar Kottam from the terrace of the exhibition hall

==== Valluvar Kottam ====
The Valluvar Kottam, constructed in 1976, is an auditorium in memory of the poet-saint Thiruvalluvar. All 1,330 verses of the poet's epic, the Thirukkural, are inscribed on the granite pillars that surround the auditorium. There is a 101-feet high temple chariot structure with a life-size image of the poet in it. The base of the chariot shows in bas-relief the 133 chapters of the Thirukkural.

==== Railway stations ====
There are a number of railway stations of interest in Chennai, primarily built throughout the colonial era. These include the Egmore station, the Royapuram station dating from 1856, the Chennai Central station dating from 1873 and the Southern Railway Headquarters built in 1922.

==== Other buildings ====
The Government Museum (designed by Henry Irwin and completed in 1896) and the College of Engineering, Guindy are some more examples of the Indo-Saracenic style of architecture.

Other buildings of architectural significance are the Presidency College, built in 1840, the Ripon Building (now housing the Chennai Corporation) dating from 1913, The War Memorial, Vivekanandar Illam, The Museum Theatre and the Ramakrishna Math temple. Adjoining the Governor's residence (Raj Bhavan) at Guindy, there are five mandapams (or memorials) dedicated to Mahatma Gandhi, the first Indian Governor General C Rajagopalachari, former Chief Ministers of the state Kamaraj and Bhaktavatsalam and one to Martyrs in general.

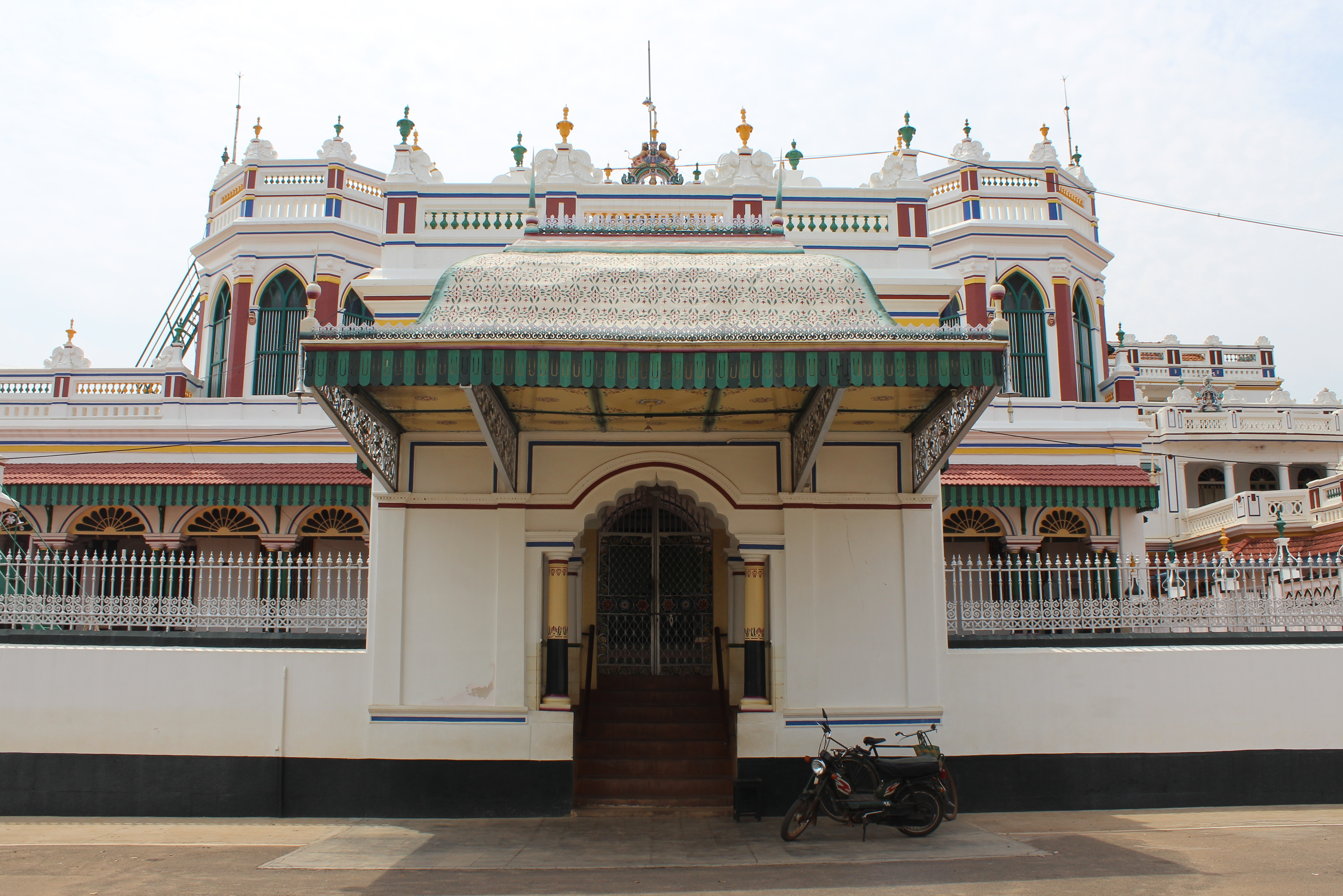
Kanadukathan Chettinadu Palace entrance, Chettinadu architecture

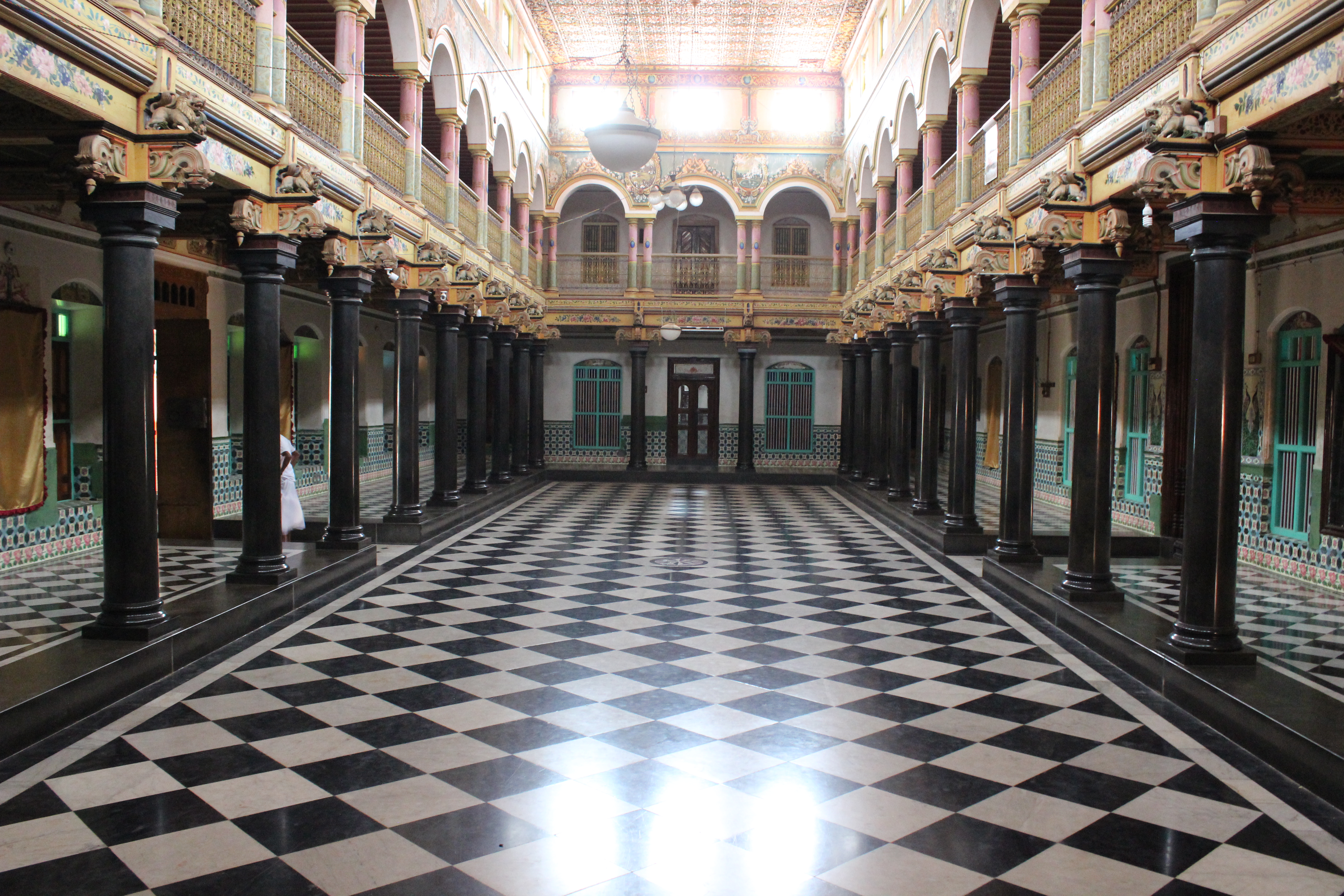
Inside of a typical chettinadu house, Chettinadu architecture

== Chettinad architecture ==
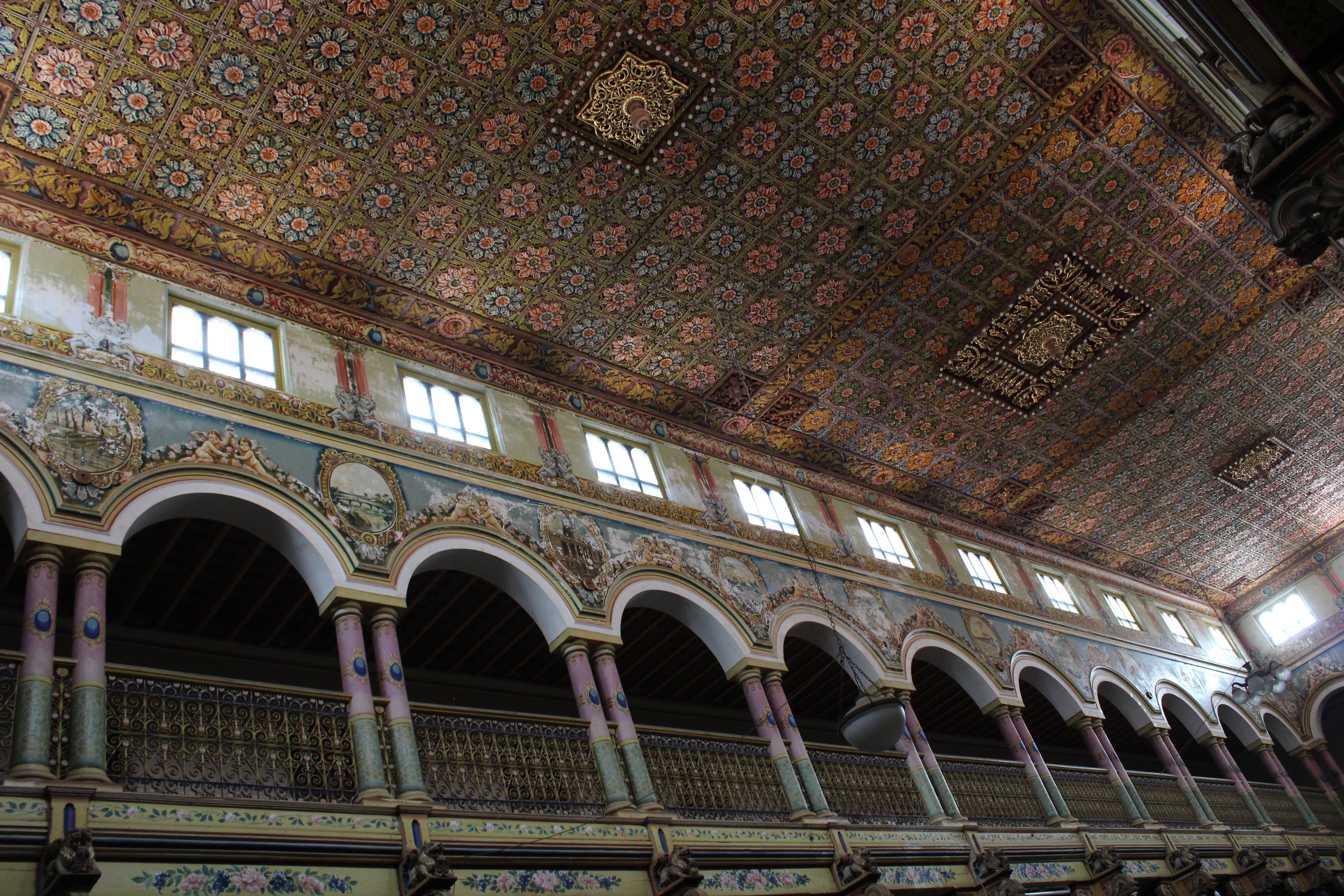
Rooftop of a typical chettinadu house, Chettinadu architecture

Chettinad is a region located mainly in the Sivaganga district ruled by Ramnad kingdom of Pandya Nadu and has a small portion extending into the Pudukottai District of Chola Nadu.

The Chettinad region is well known for its 19th-century mansions, whose wide courtyards and spacious rooms are embellished with marble and teak. Construction materials, decorative items and furnishings were mostly imported from East Asian countries and Europe. The marble was brought from Italy, chandeliers and teak from Burma, crockery from Indonesia, crystals from Europe and wall-to-wall mirrors from Belgium.

Many of these mansions were built using a type of limestone known as karai. Local legend has it that the mansion walls were polished with a paste made out of eggwhites to give them a smooth texture.

== Post-Independence ==
After Independence, the state witnessed a rise in a blend of Modern and Traditional style of architecture.

=== Notable Post-Independence buildings ===
==== Gandhi Mandapam ====
Built in 1956, the Gandhi Mandapam is a set of memorials dedicated to Mahatma Gandhi and numerous other Chief Ministers of Tamil Nadu. Its total area is 18 acres and it contains an amphitheater and a museum. The memorial is unique as it is modelled in the style of a South Indian temple.

==== Vivekananda Rock Memorial ====
The Vivekananda Rock Memorial was constructed in 1970 in the memory of Swami Vivekananda. It is located on an island near Kanyakumari next to the Thiruvalluvar Statue. Eknath Ranade, a social activist who was influenced by the teachings of Swami Vivekananda, played a crucial role in the construction of the memorial. He also founded the Vivekananda Kendra adjacent to the memorial in 1972.

==== Thiruvalluvar Statue ====
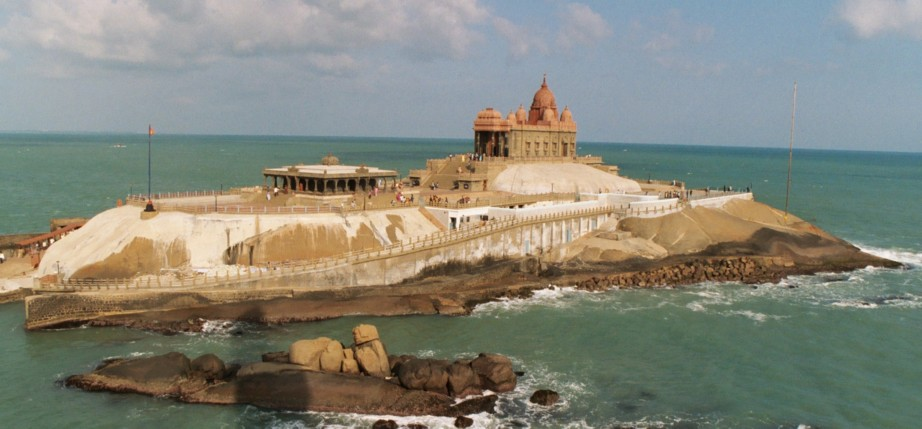
Vivekananda Rock Memorial, Kanyakumari

The Thiruvalluvar Statue, whose construction started in 1990 and completed in 1999, is a 133-feet high (statue height 95 feet erected on a 38 feet stone pedestal) dedicated to the Tamil poet Thiruvalluvar, who wrote Thirukkural, considered one of the greatest works in literature of morality and ethics. The height signifies the 133 chapters of Thirukkaral. The statue is located on an island near the southernmost city of mainland India, Kanyakumari. It was constructed by Ganapati Sthapati.

== See also ==
- Architecture of Chennai
- Architecture of India
- Chola architecture
- List of temples in Tamil Nadu
- Pallava architecture
