= Tiger Cave (India) =

Rock cut temple in Tamil Nadu, India

Coordinates: 12.65°N 80.20°E

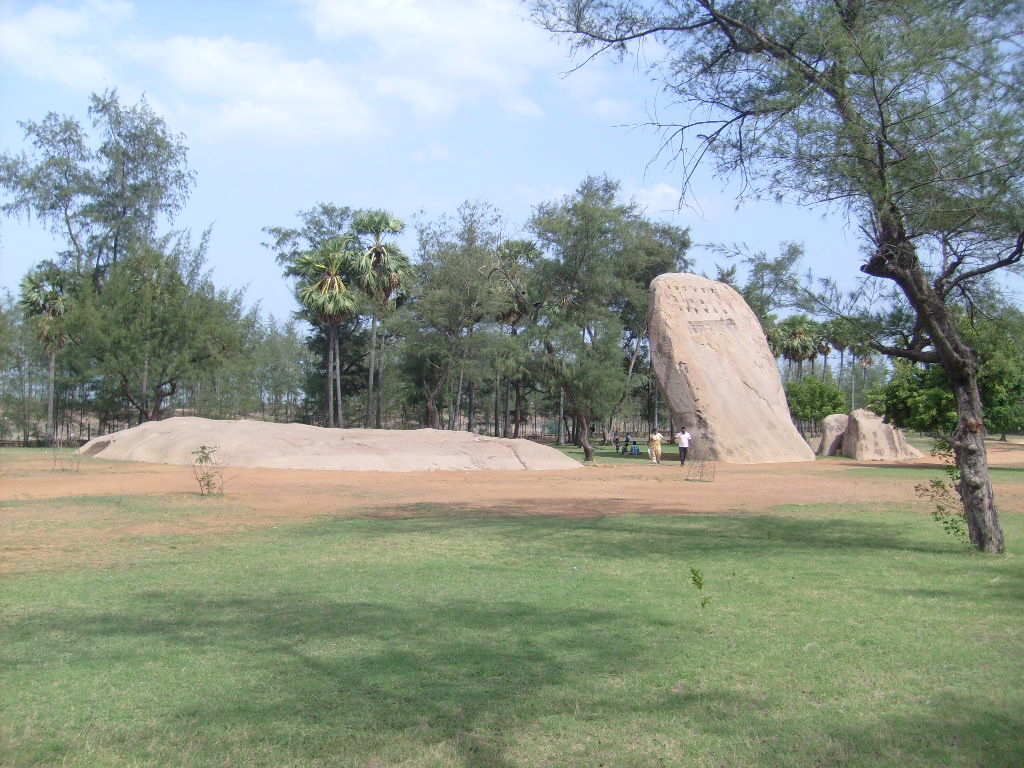
The rocky outcrop close to Tiger Cave. The discovery of an inscription on one of these led to the excavation of the Subrahmanya Temple

The Yali Mandabam (Tiger Cave) is a rock-cut Hindu temple complex located in the hamlet of Saluvankuppam near Mahabalipuram in Tamil Nadu, India. It gets its name from the carvings of tiger heads on the mouth of a cave which forms a part of the complex. The Yali Mandabam (Tiger Cave) is considered to be one of the Mahabalipuram rock-cut temples constructed by the Pallavas in the 8th century AD. The site is located on the Bay of Bengal coast and is a popular picnic spot and tourist destination. The temple is maintained by the Archaeological Survey of India (ASI). The discovery of an inscription on a rocky outcrop in the Yali Mandabam (Tiger Cave) complex in 2005 led to the excavation of a Sangam period Muruga Temple close by.

== Architecture ==
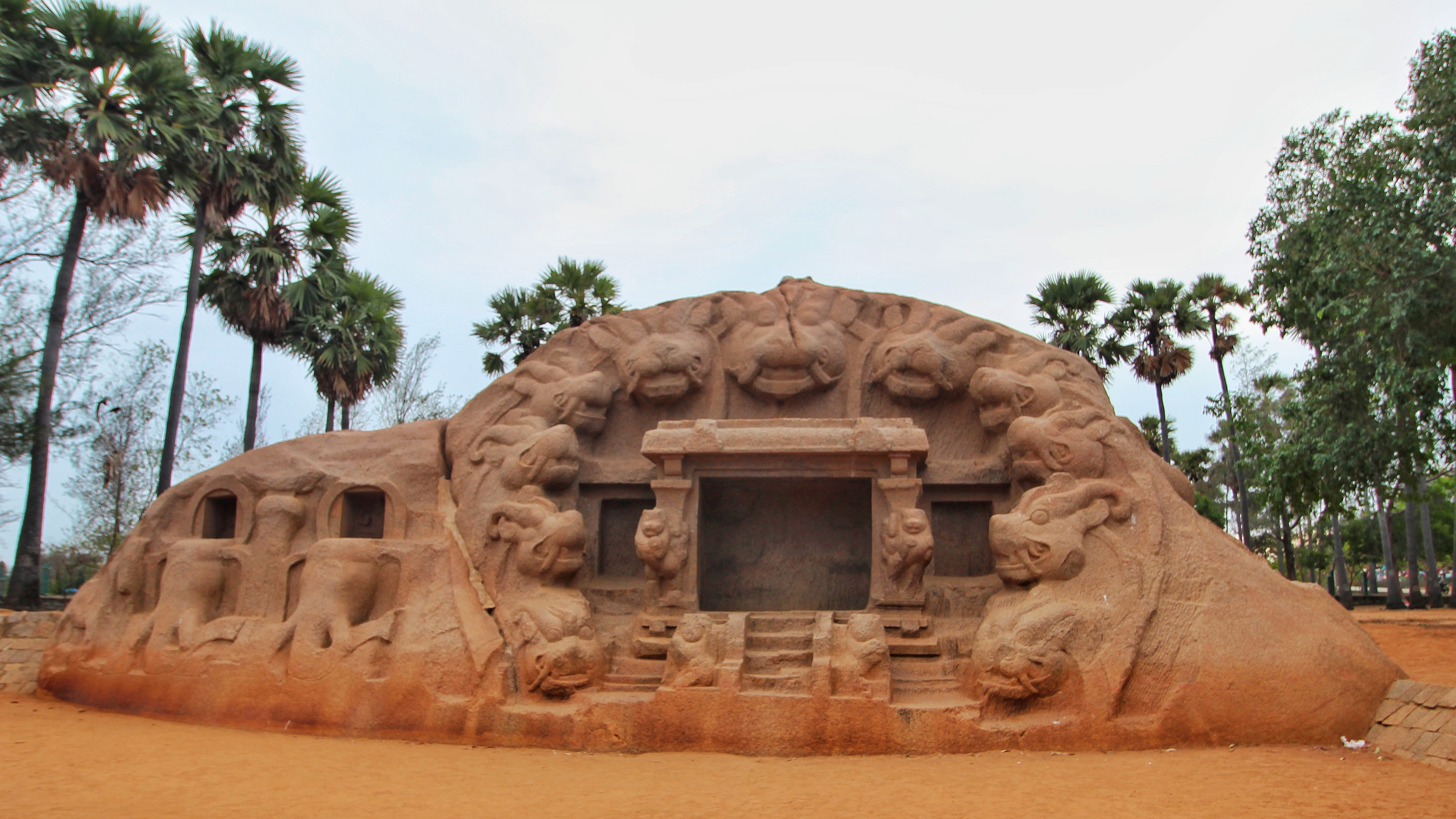
The Tiger cave with tiger head carvings at the mouth of the cave

The cave temple is located 4.8 km (3.0 mi) away from Mahabalipuram, a world heritage site for the Group of Monuments at Mahabalipuram. The rock cut shrine has a flight of steps. It has a small portico flanked by two pilasters which are supported by rampant tigers. All around the entrance, there are images of tigers, leading to the name of Tiger cave. There are two other cells that have elephant heads carved beneath them. Based on the architectural style, the cave is associated with Rajasimha Narasimhavaram II (690–728).
