= Saluvankuppam =

Hamlet in Chengalpattu, Tamil Nadu, India

Coordinates: 12°39′N 80°12′E

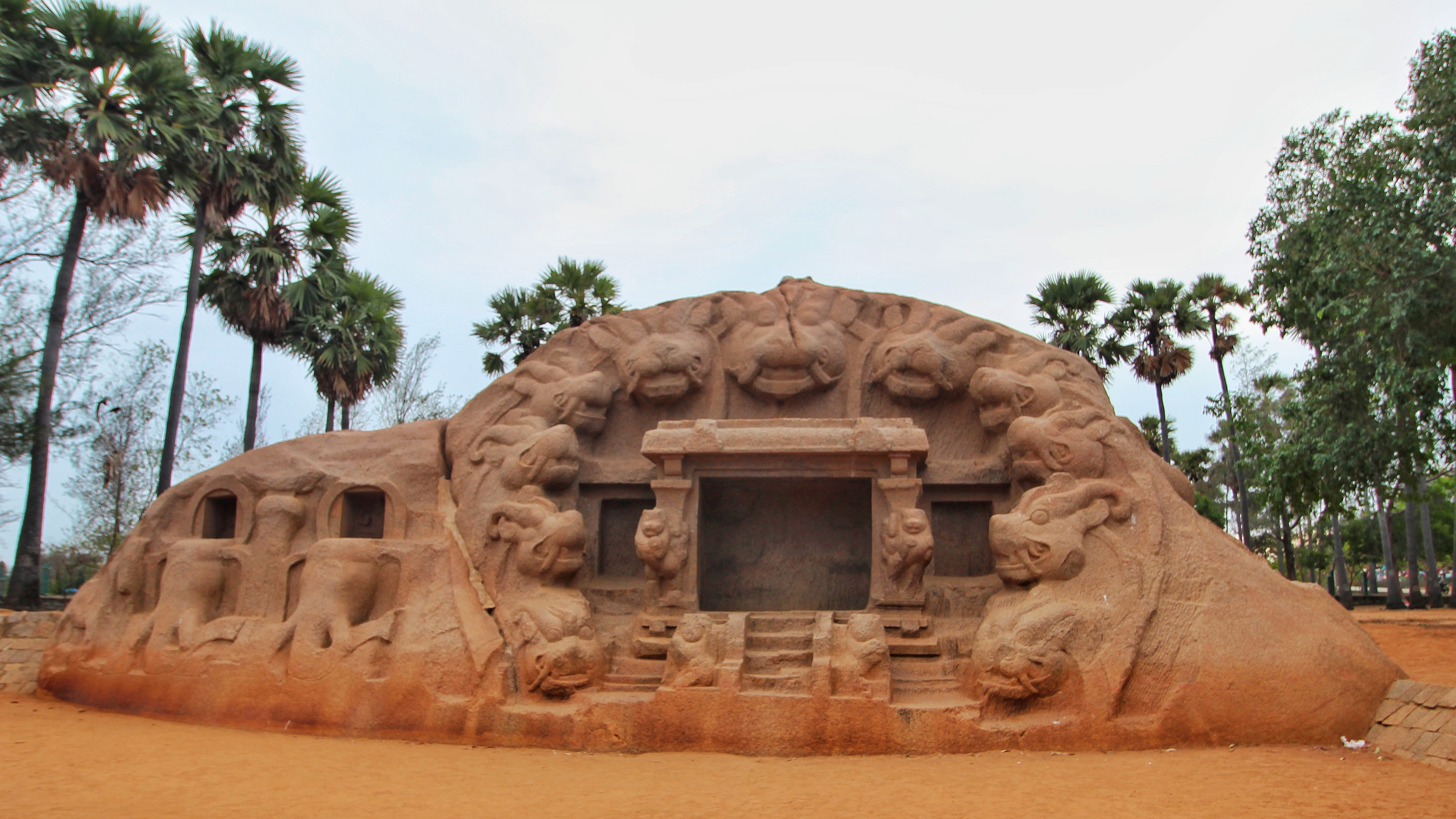
Tiger Cave

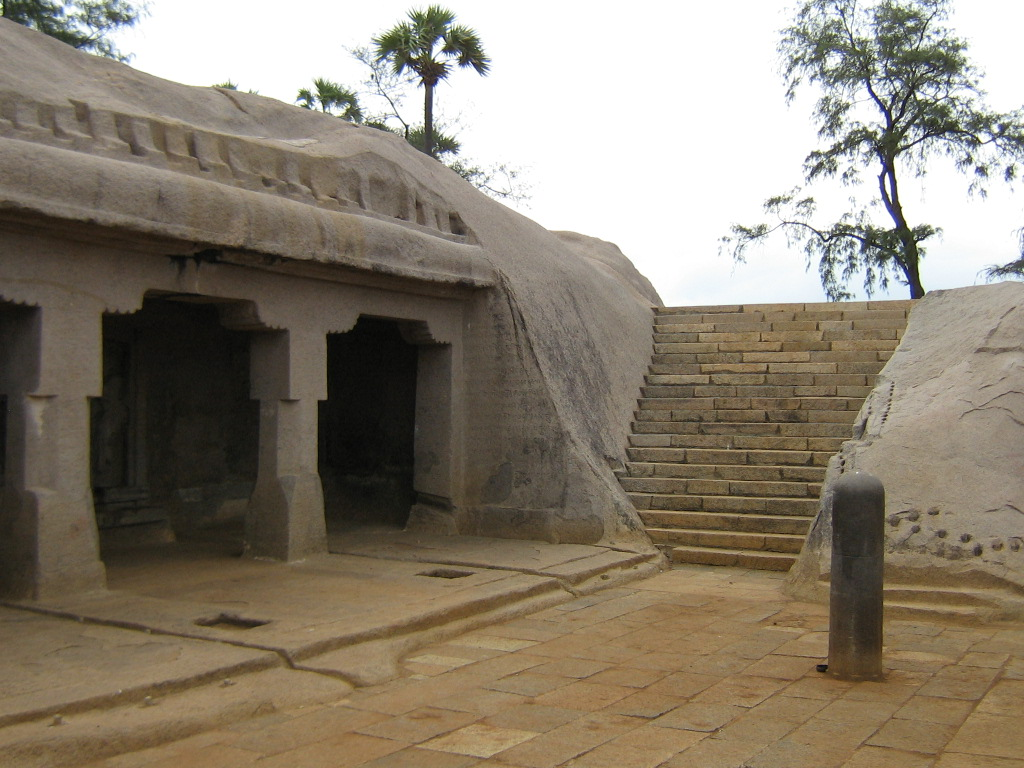
Saluvankuppam Adhiranasanda Pallaveshwaram

Saluvankuppam, also spelt as Salavankuppam or Saluvanakuppam, is a coastal hamlet in the Chengalpattu district of Tamil Nadu, India. It is situated on the East Coast Road at a distance of 7 kilometres from Mahabalipuram on the Chennai-Mahabalipuram stretch. The Tiger Cave, which forms a part of the UNESCO World Heritage Site of Mahabalipuram is located here. The recently unearthed Murugan Temple close to Tiger Cave is also located here. The hamlet along with its surroundings house a number of resorts and is a popular tourist destination.

== History ==
The places in and around Saluvankuppam are known to have been inhabited since the early centuries of the Common era. Earlier known as Thiruvizhchil, the town was renamed as "Saluvankuppam" during Vijayanagar period after the Saluva king Saluva Narasimha Deva Raya.
