= Murugan Temple, Saluvankuppam =

Hindu temple ruins

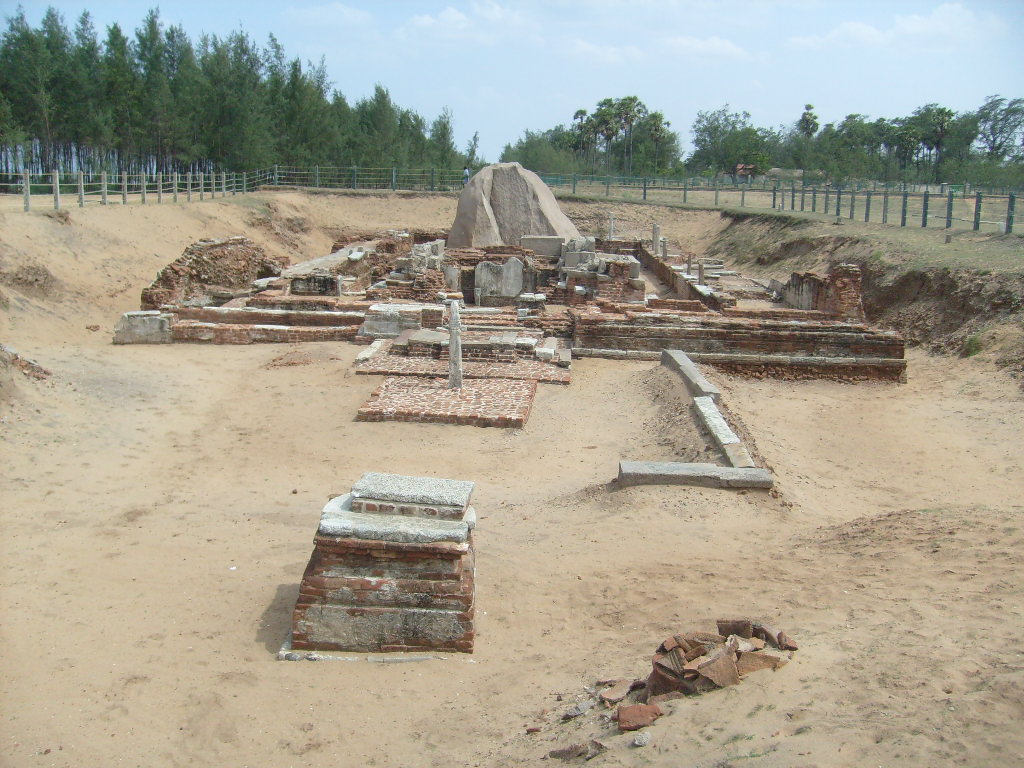
- Front view of the Murugan Temple

Religion
- Affiliation: Dravidian folk religion Hinduism
- District: Chengalpattu
- Deity: Murugan

Location
- Location: Saluvankuppam
- State: Tamil Nadu
- Country: India

Architecture
- Completed: Sangam era 200 BCE with later construction

The Murugan Temple at Saluvankuppam, Tamil Nadu, India, is a shrine dedicated to Tamil deity Murugan (also known as Seyyon) of Hinduism. Archaeologists believe that the shrine, unearthed in 2005, consists of two layers: a brick temple constructed during the Sangam period (the 3rd century BCE to the 3rd century CE) and a granite Pallava temple dating from the 8th century CE and constructed on top of the brick shrine making it the oldest temple in India. The Archaeological Survey of India (ASI) team which conducted the excavation believe that brick temple could be the oldest of its kind to be discovered in Tamil Nadu.

The temple was discovered by a team of archaeologists from the ASI based on clues found in a rock inscription left exposed by the 2004 Indian Ocean tsunami. Initially, excavations revealed an 8th-century Pallava-era shrine. Further excavations revealed that the 8th-century shrine had been built on the brick foundation of an earlier shrine. The brick shrine has been dated to the Sangam period.

The temple faces north, unlike most Hindu temples. Artefacts from two phases, the Sangam phase as well as the Pallava phase, have been found. The temple is Tamil Nadu's oldest shrine to Murugan. It is also believed to be one of only two pre-Pallava temples to be discovered in the state, the other being the Veetrirundha Perumal Temple at Veppathur.

On the night of 3 May 2018, the site was vandalized by unknown persons who uprooted the Stone Vel and broke it into two pieces.

== Discovery ==
After the 2004 Indian Ocean tsunami had subsided, archaeologists discovered rock inscriptions which had been exposed by the tsunami waves close to the hamlet of Saluvankuppam, near the UNESCO-designated World Heritage Site of Mahabalipuram. The inscriptions by the Rashtrakuta king Krishna III and the Chola kings Parantaka I and Kulothunga Chola I spoke of a Subrahmanya Temple at Thiruvizhchil (the present day Saluvanakuppam). S. Rajavelu, epigraphist with the Archaeological Survey of India (ASI), identified a nearby mound as the site of the temple. In 2005, archaeologists unearthed an 8th-century Pallava temple under the mound. G. Thirumoorthy, ASI Assistant Archaeologist, believed that the shrine could be the oldest Murugan temple to be excavated in Tamil Nadu. There were speculations on whether the temple could be one of the "Seven Pagodas".

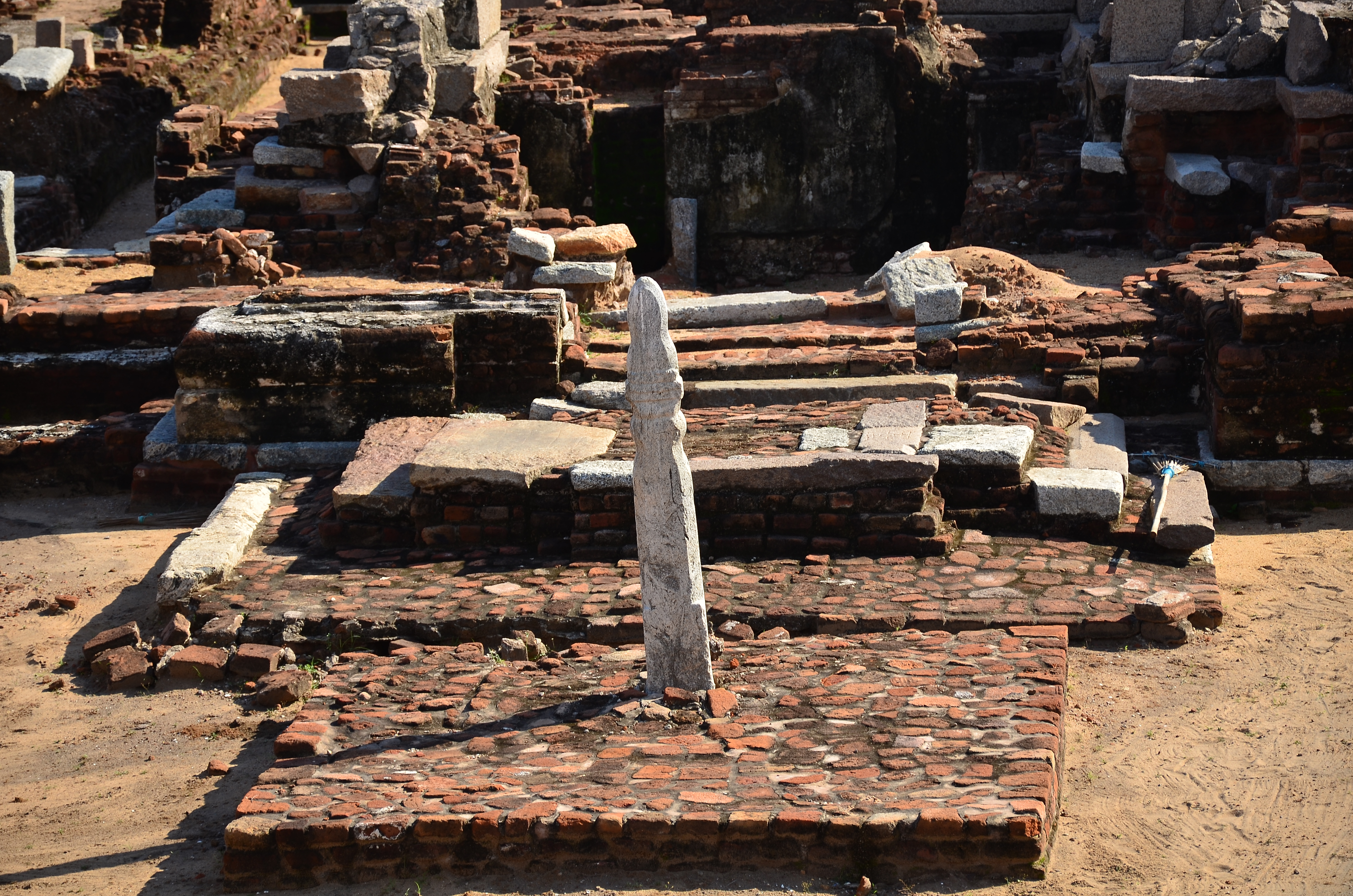
Stone vel on a brick platform at the entrance to the shrine

However, further excavations revealed that the 8th-century temple was constructed over the remains of an older brick temple. According to Thirumoorthy, the garbhagriha or sanctum sanctorum of the brick temple was filled with sand and covered with granite slabs upon which the newer temple was constructed. Sathyamurthy, Superintendent, ASI Chennai Circle, said that the brick temple could be dated to the Sangam period as the shrine faced north unlike modern temples which face either east or west. This proved conclusively that the temple was constructed before the 6th or 7th century CE when the shilpa shastras, the canonical texts of temple architecture, were written. Estimates of the age of the brick shrine range from 1700 to 2200 years.

Archaeologists believe that the brick shrine was destroyed either by a cyclone or a tsunami which took place 2,200 years ago. The Pallavas built a granite temple on the brick foundation in the 8th century CE, which also was likely to have been destroyed by a tsunami. Archaeologists believe that the second tsunami must have occurred in the 13th century CE as the latest inscriptions which speak of the shrine have been dated to 1215.

== Historical background ==
Although the city of Mahabalipuram was constructed by the Pallava king Narasimhavarman I in the 7th century CE, there is evidence that a small port might have functioned at the site even earlier. Megalithic burial urns dating to the very dawn of the Christian era have been discovered near Mahabalipuram. The Sangam age poem Perumpāṇāṟṟuppaṭai describes a port called Nirppeyyaru which some scholars identify with the present-day Mahabalipuram. Sadras near Mahabalipuram has been identified as the site of the port of Sopatma mentioned in the Periplus of the Erythraean Sea.

== Inscriptions ==
There are many rock inscriptions near the temple. The discovery of three granite pillars with inscriptions of grants made to the shrine led to the discovery of the temple itself. While one pillar contains an inscription recording the donation of ten kazhanchus (small balls) of gold by one Kirarpiriyan of Mahabalipuram in 858, another records the donation of 16 kazhanchus of gold in 813 for the maintenance of a lamp by a Brahmin woman named Vasanthanar. The third pillar has an inscription by Raja Raja Chola I. Apart from these, there are five other pillars with inscriptions by the Pallava kings Dantivarman I, Nandivarman III and Kambavarman, the Rashtrakuta king Krishna III and the Chola king Rajendra Chola III.

== Architecture ==
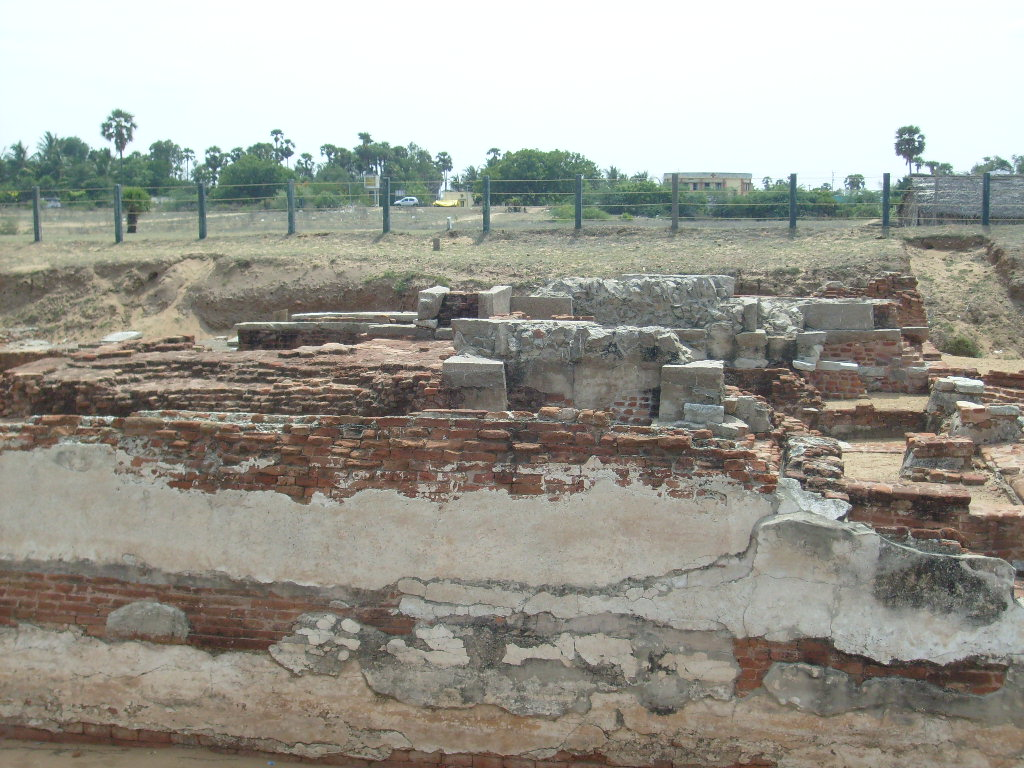
A portion of the brick prakara or compound wall of the Murugan Temple

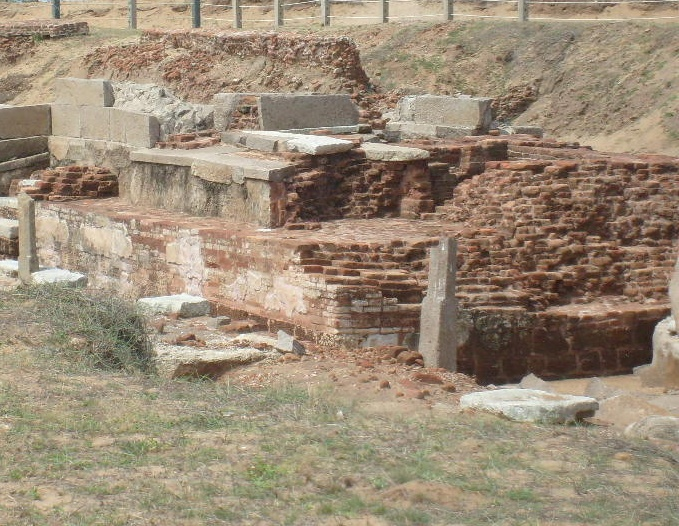
The Garbhagriha or sanctum sanctorum of the Murugan Temple, Saluvankuppam. While the thin, tabular bricks at the top were laid by the Pallavas, the larger bricks underneath date from the Sangam period

The temple is dedicated to the Tamil Hindu deity Murugan and faces north. The garbhagriha or sanctum sanctorum is 2 metres long and 2.2 metres wide and is made of 27 courses of bricks. The bricks used are similar to the ones used in other Sangam age sites such as Puhar, Urayur, Mangudi and Arikamedu. A stone vel is positioned at the entrance of the shrine. During the excavations, a terracotta plaque depicting a Kuravai Koothu, a dance which is mentioned in the 1st century CE Tamil epic Silappadhikaram, was discovered. Sathyamoorthy feels that there may not have been any idol in the square garbhagriha as it is too small to house one. The temple is surrounded by a prakara or a compound wall dating from the Sangam period. According to Thirumoorthy, the shrine is "the biggest brick temple complex dating to the pre-Pallava period".

The temple is built on a cushion of alluvium on which a layer of man-made bricks were laid. On top of this were another four layers of man-made bricks separated by four layers of laterite. There were two types of bricks used: large-sized laterite bricks of the Sangam period and thin, tabular bricks of a later age. The bricks were plastered together with lime.

== Artefacts unearthed ==
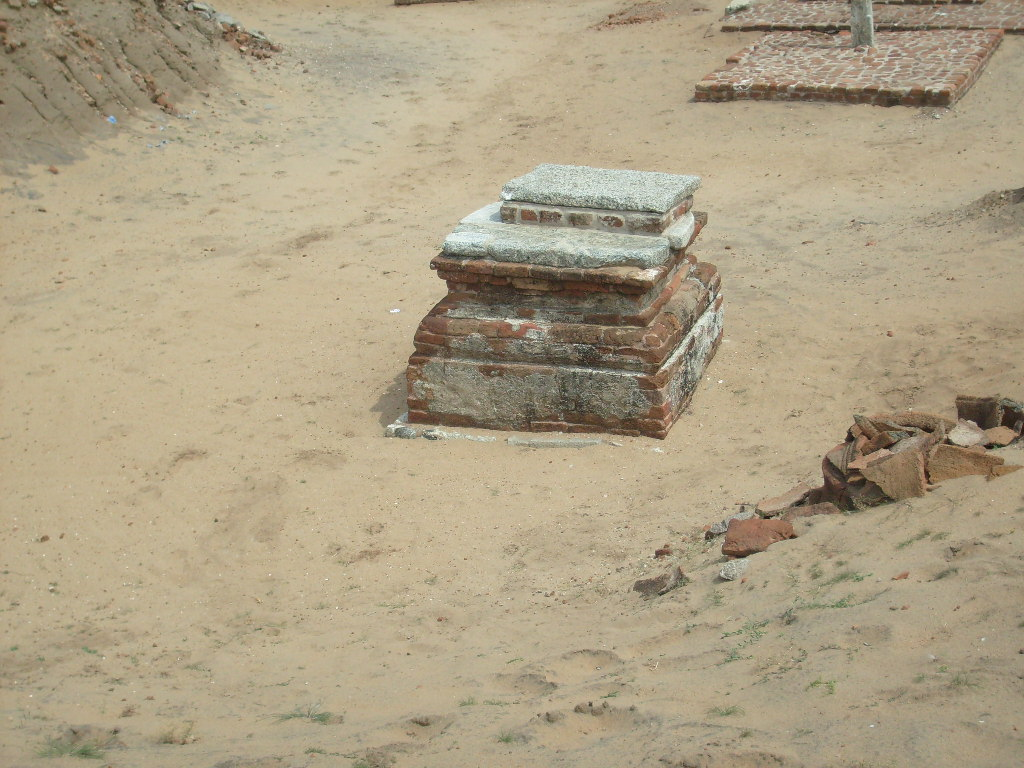
Potsherds and granite slabs unearthed at the excavation site. Some of the potsherds have been dated to the Sangam period

A terracotta Nandi (the bull of the god Shiva), head of a woman, terracotta lamps, potsherds and a shivalinga (an iconic symbol of Shiva) made of green stone are some of the important artifacts found at the site. The Nandi is the first one made of terracotta to be found. While most of the items unearthed belong to the Sangam period, artefacts of a later period including a Chola copper coin have also been found.

== See also ==
- Mundeshwari Temple
- Mangala Devi Kannagi Temple

== See also ==
- Gudimallam Lingam
