= Soundararajaperumal Temple =

Soundararajaperumal Temple may refer to several places:

- Soundararajaperumal Temple, Nagapattinam, a temple in Nagapattinam, Tamil Nadu, India
- Soundararajaperumal Temple, Thadikombu, a temple in Thadikombu, Tamil Nadu, India
