= Kasi Viswanathar Temple, Tenkasi =

Shiva temple in Tenkasi district, Tamil Nadu, India

Kasi Viswanathar Temple
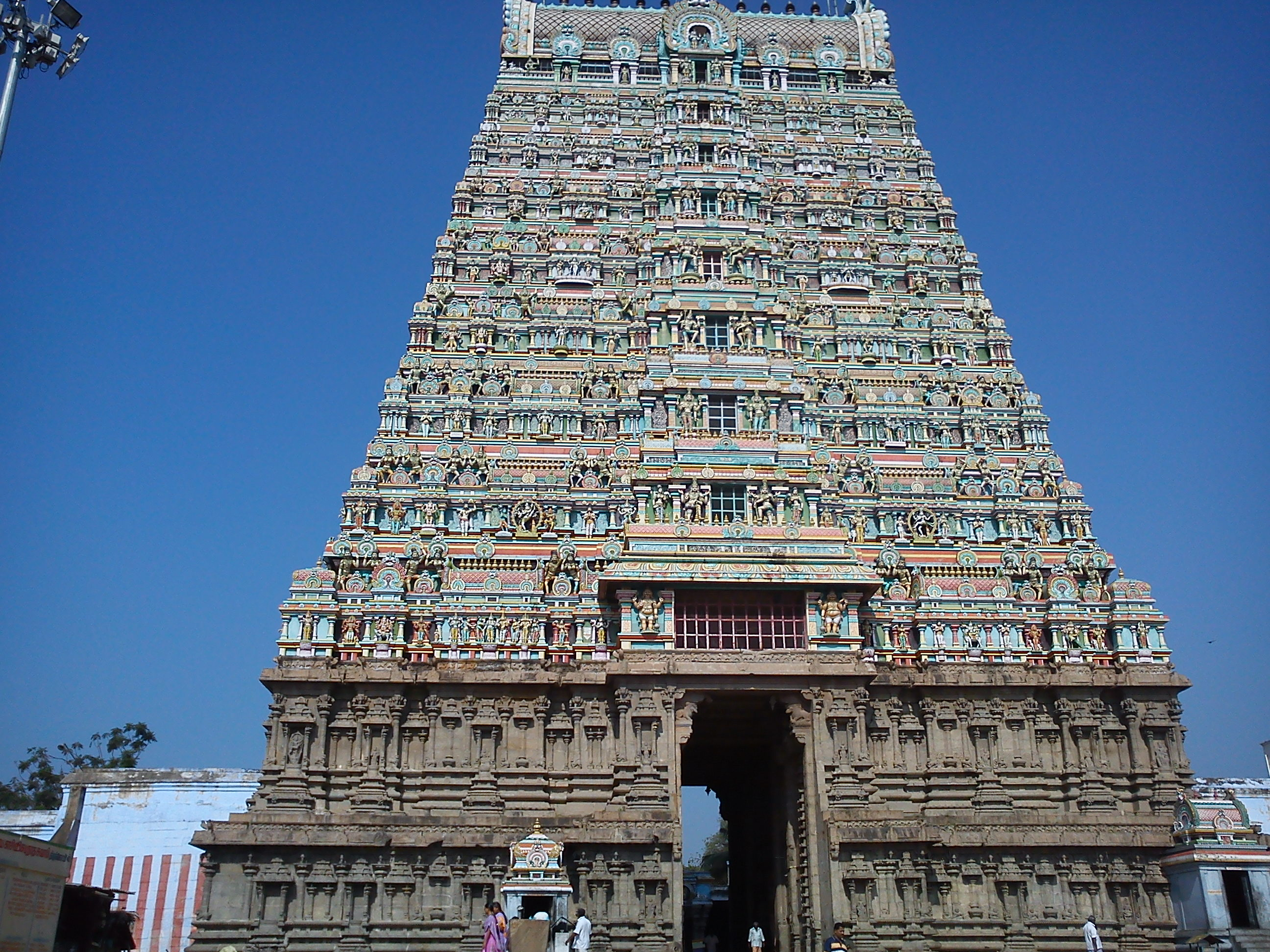

- Location in Tamil Nadu

Religion
- Affiliation: Hinduism
- District: Tenkasi
- Deity: Kasi Viswanathar(Shiva) Ulagamman(Parvathi)

Location
- Location: Tenkasi
- State: Tamil Nadu
- Country: India
- Coordinates: 8°57′24″N 77°18′27″E

Architecture
- Type: Tamilan architecture

Kasi Viswanathar Temple in Tenkasi, a city in Tenkasi district in the South Indian state of Tamil Nadu, is dedicated to the Hindu god Shiva. Constructed in the Tamil style of architecture, the temple is believed to have been built by Pandyan ruler Parakrama Pandyan during the 13th century, with later additions from Madurai Nayaks. Shiva is worshipped as Kasi Viswanathar and his consort Parvathi as Ulagamman(Lokanayaki).

A granite wall surrounds the temple, enclosing all its shrines. The temple is open from 6 am - 12 pm and 4 - 8:30 pm on all days except during new moon days when it is open the full day. Four daily rituals and three yearly festivals are held at the temple, of which the Maasi Maham festival during the Tamil month of Maasi (February - March) being the most prominent. The temple is maintained and administered by the Hindu Religious and Endowment Board of the Government of Tamil Nadu.

== Legend ==
As per Hindu legend, a Pandya king Parakrama Pandyan wanted to construct a temple for Hindu god Shiva at Tenkasi and went to Kasi to bring a lingam, an iconic representation of Shiva in South India. Shiva appeared in his dream and asked him to follow the army of ants. The next day he found that there was an army of ants. The king realised that it was because of the divine intervention that he was prevented from going to Varanasi. He built the temple in the place where the anthill ended.

== History ==
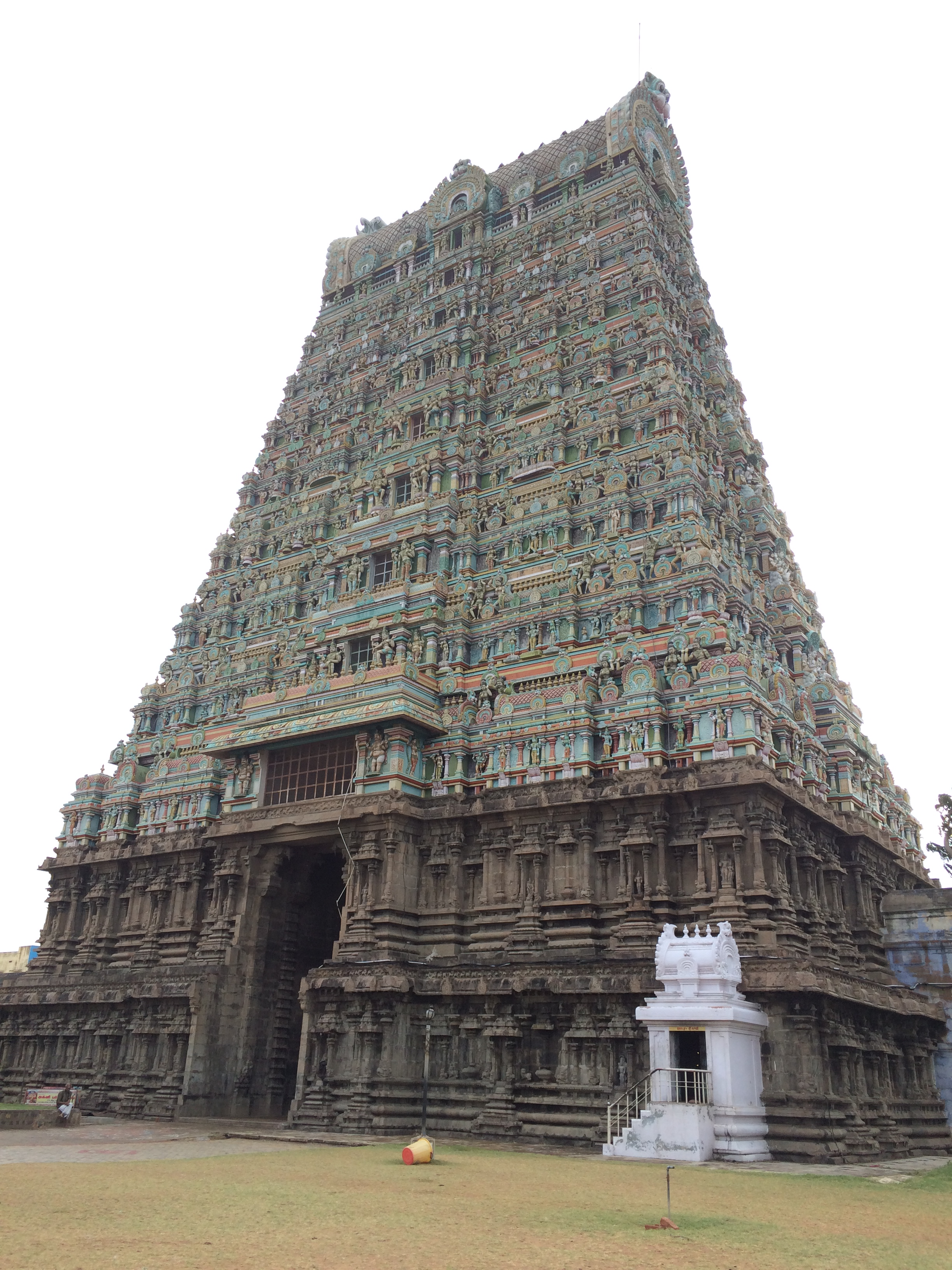
Temple Tower

Tenkasi was established during the early 13th century CE. There are inscriptions in the temple dated 1384 from the period of King Vira Pandyan mentioning the gift of houses and villages to Brahmanas to recite Vedas and Purana in the temple. Between 1428 and 1460, a Pandya king Parakrama Pandyan ruled the southern part of Madurai region, comprising the modern day Tenkasi and it surroundings. There was contrasting dates on the rule of Parakrama Pandyan, with some mentioning the year as 1309, while the inscription in the temple indicating as 1309. Tenkasi was a part of Madurai region during the 16th century. Madurai became independent from Vijayanagar Empire in 1559 under the Nayaks and the temple started receiving gifts from the rulers of the dynasty. The temple had a flat tower till 1967, when a 180-foot artistically built temple tower was initiated and completed in 1990.

== Architecture ==
Tenkasi is built around the Kasi Viswanathar temple. The temple has a seven-tiered gopuram (temple tower) and has concentric granite walls that enshrines all the shrines in the temple. The temple has a pillared hall from the entrance leading to the flagstaff hall. The sanctum is located axial to the entrance facing east. The image of Kasi Viswanathar in the form of lingam is housed in the sanctum. The images of Vinayaka and Subramanya are located on either side of the hall leading to the sanctum. The shrine of Ulagamman is located parallel to the sanctum facing East. There are smaller shrines of Dakshinamurthy, Arumugar, Durga, Navagrahas and Nataraja in the precinct around the shrines of Kasi Viswanatha and Ulagamman. The composite columns of Virabhadra holding sword and horn are found be additions of the Vijayanayagara kings during the early 1500s. Similar columns of Virabhadra are found in Adikesava Perumal Temple at Thiruvattaru, Meenakshi Temple at Madurai, Nellaiappar Temple at Tirunelveli, Krishnapuram Venkatachalapathy temple, Ramanathaswamy Temple at Rameswaram, Soundararajaperumal temple at Thadikombu, Srivilliputhur Andal temple, Srivaikuntanathan Permual temple at Srivaikuntam, Avudayarkovil, Vaishnava Nambi and Thirukurungudivalli Nachiar temple at Thirukkurungudi.

== Festival ==
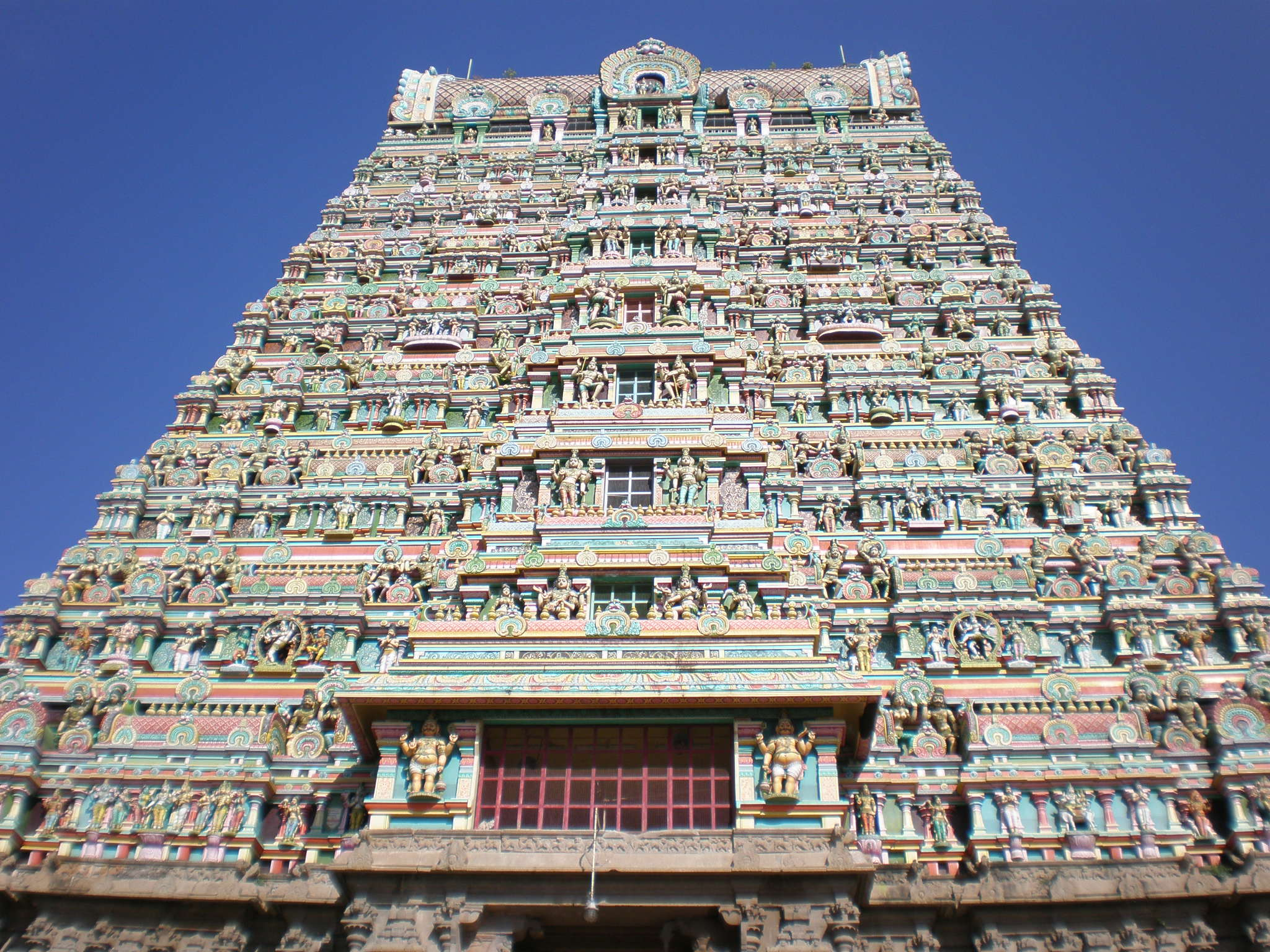
Another view of the temple tower

The temple follows Shaivite tradition. The temple priests perform the pooja (rituals) during festivals and on a daily basis. The temple rituals are performed four times a day:

- Kalasanthi at 8:30 a.m.
- Uchikalam at 11:30 a.m.
- Sayarakshai at 5:30 p.m.
- Aravanai Pooja between 8:00 - 9:00 p.m.

There are weekly, monthly and fortnightly rituals performed in the temple. The temple is open from 6am - 12 pm and 4-9:00 pm on all days except during festival days when it is open the full day. There are various festivals celebrated in the temple. The Masi Magam festival during the Tamil month of Masi (February - march) is the most prominent festival celebrated in the temple. Tirukalyanam festival during Aipassi (October - November), Moola festival during Aavani (August - September), Navarathri, Karthikai festival, Thiruvathirai, Thaipusam, Sivarathri, Panguni Uthiram are the other festivals celebrated in the temple.
