= Nellaiappar Temple =

Hindu temple in Tamil Nadu, India

- Tirunelveli
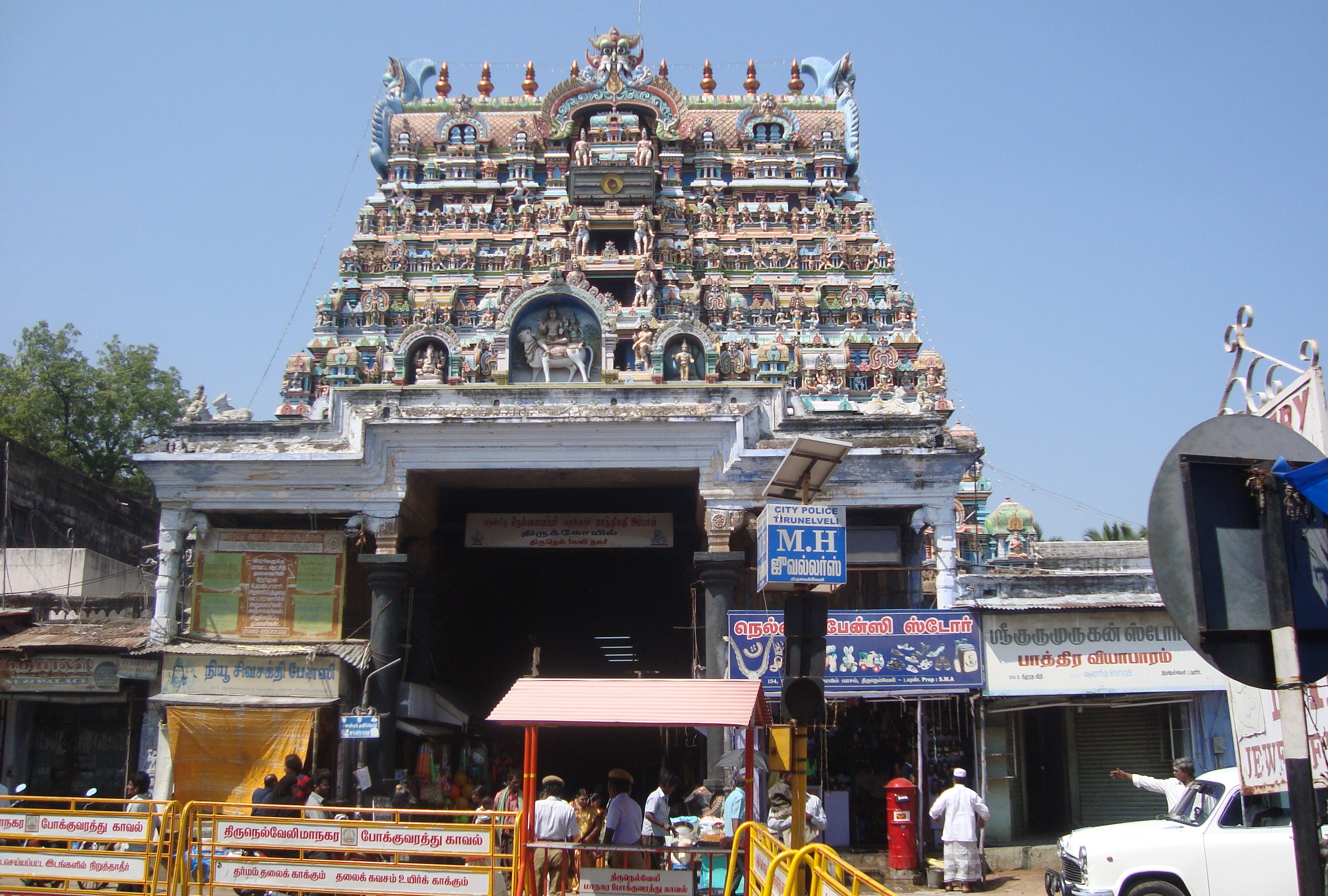

- Location in Tamil Nadu

Religion
- Affiliation: Hinduism
- District: Tirunelveli
- Deity: Nellaiappar (Shiva) Kanthimathi Amman (Parvati)
- Features: Tower: Kailasa Sikaram

Location
- Location: Tirunelveli
- State: Tamil Nadu
- Country: India
- Coordinates: 8°43′42.4″N 77°41′19.4″E

Architecture
- Type: Tamil architecture
- Creator: Early Pandyas, Medieval Cholas
- Completed: 700 CE
- Direction of façade: East

Website
- http://kanthimathinellaiappar.tnhrce.in/

The Nellaiappar Temple is a Hindu temple to the deity Shiva in Tirunelveli, a city in the Indian state of Tamil Nadu. Shiva is worshipped as Nellaiappar (also called Venuvananathar) represented by the lingam and his consort Parvati is depicted as Kanthimathi Amman. The deity Vishnu is also worshipped here, having witnessed their wedding according to legend. Hence, this temple is regarded as an abhimana kshetram of Vaishnavism. The temple is located on the northern banks of Thamirabarani River in Tirunelveli district. The presiding deity is mentioned in the 7th century Tamil Saiva canonical work, the Tevaram, written by Tamil saint poets known as the nayanmars and classified as Paadal Petra Sthalam.

The temple complex covers an area of 5.9 hectares (14.5 acres) and all its shrines are enclosed with concentric rectangular walls.

The original complex is believed to have been built by Pandyas, while the present masonry structure was added by Cholas, Pallavas, Cheras, and Madurai Nayaks. In modern times, the temple is maintained and adminIstered by the Hindu Religious and Charitable Endowments Department of the Government of Tamil Nadu.

== History ==
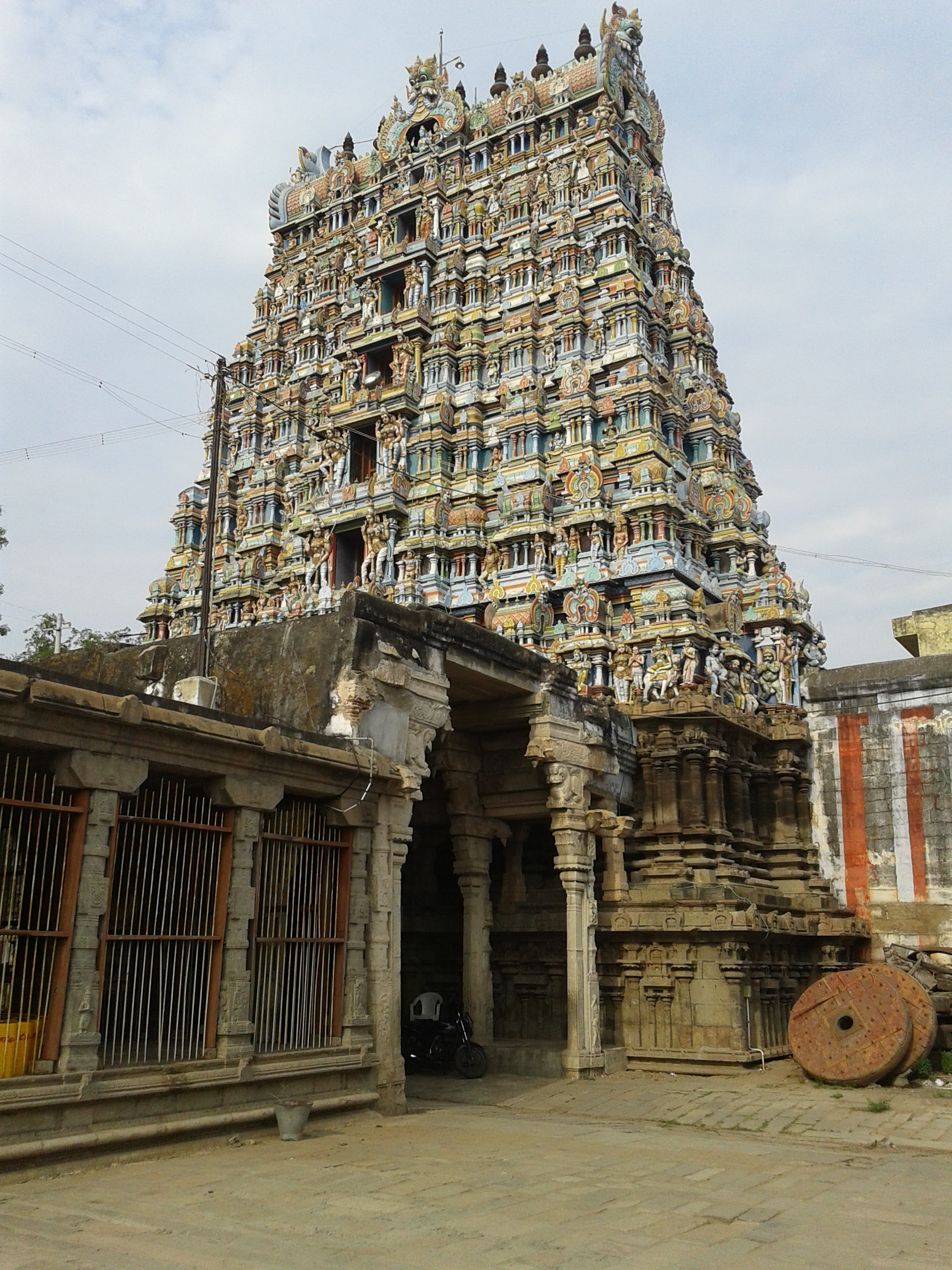
The Gopuram of Nellaiappar Temple

Tirunelveli is one of the many temple towns in the district which is named after the groves, clusters or forests dominated by a particular variety of a tree or shrub and the same variety of tree or shrub sheltering the presiding deity. The region is believed to have been covered with Venu forest and hence called Venuvanam.

The original complex is believed to have been built by Pandyas, while the present masonry structure was added by Cholas, Pallavas, Cheras, and Madurai Nayaks. The sanctums of the temple and the gopurams were constructed by Nindraseer Nedumaran (Koon Pandian) who reigned in the 7th century AD. The mani mandapam with its musical pillar was also likely built by Nindraseer Nedumaran. The flag stand near the Nandi was set up in 1155.

Originally, the Nellaiappar and Kanthimathi temples were two independent structures with spaces in between. It was in 1647 that Thiru Vadamalaiappa Pillaiyan, a great devotee of Siva linked the two temples by building the "Chain mandapam" (In Tamil Sangili Mandapam). In the centre of the Flower Garden is a square vasantha mandapam with 100 pillars. The Nandi mandapam is said to have been built by Sivanthiappa Nayakar in 1654. To the western portion of the chain mandapam is the flower garden that was set up in 1756 by Thiruvengadakrishna Mudaliar.

There are a number of stone inscriptions in the temple. The most important of them are those Veerapandiyan who reigned around 950 AD and those of Rajendran I and Kulothunga Chola I. The inscriptions of Maravarman Sundara Pandyan refer to the Lord as "Woodayar" and "Wodeyanayanar" and the Goddess as "Nachiar". From the inscriptions of Kulasekkara Pandiyan we learn that he defeated the Chera, Chola and Hoysala kings and built the outer walls of the temple with the spoils of war.

== Legend ==
During the Puranic period, the site of this temple was called Venuvana, a forest of bamboos. The deity in the current temple is believed to have appeared inside this bamboo forest. Vishnu is believed to have witnessed the wedding between Shiva and Parvati at this place. There is an image of Vishnu with a metallic gindi, a vessel with a spout, in the temple depicting the legend.

== Architecture ==
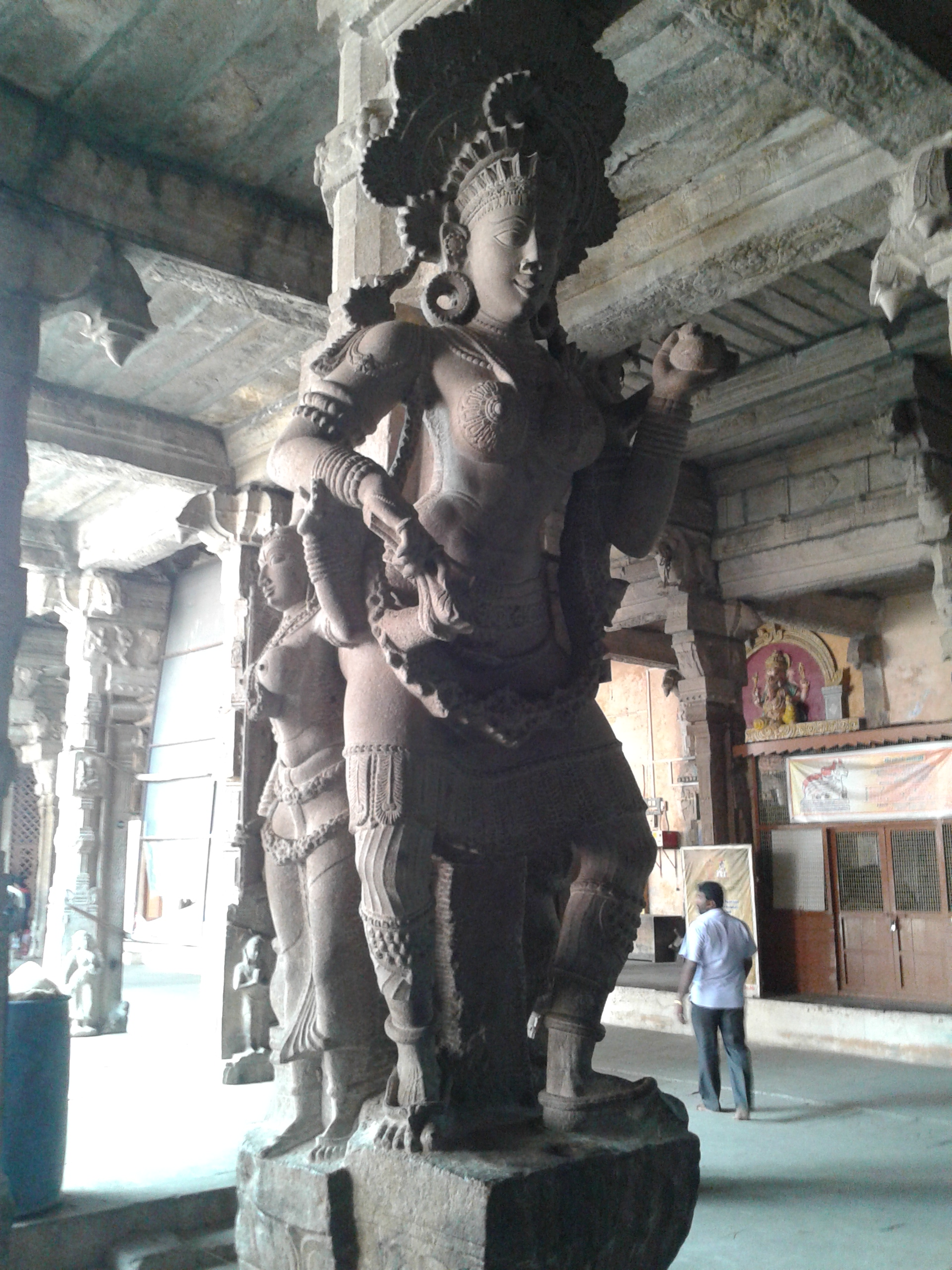

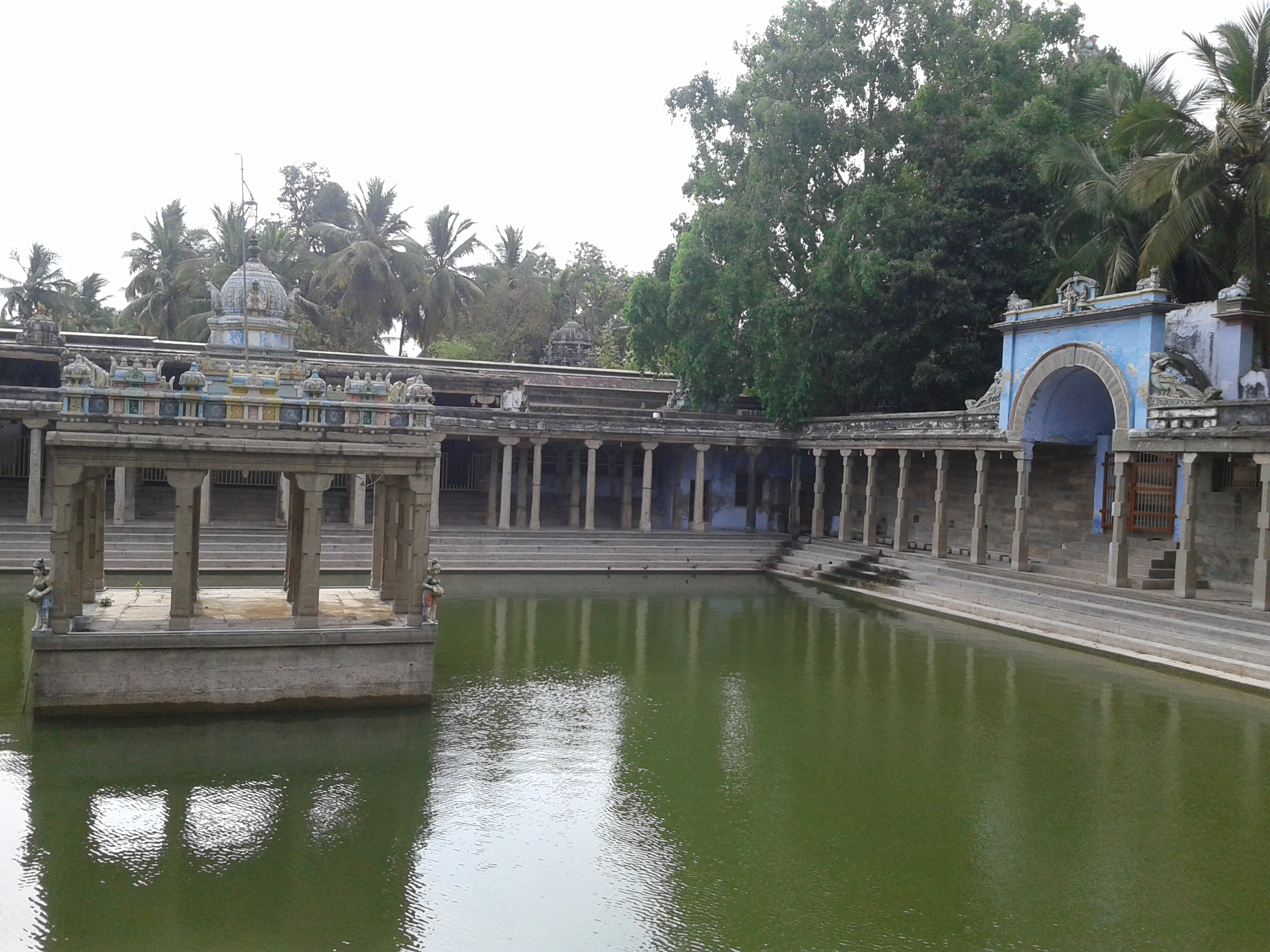
The temple tank

The temple complex covers an area of 5.9 hectares (14.5 acres), measuring 260 metres (850 ft) long and 230 metres (756 ft) wide, and all its shrines are enclosed with concentric rectangular walls, with a massive Rajagopuram. Sangili Mandapam built on 1647 by vadamalaiyappa pillayan connects the Ganthimathi Amman and Nellaiyappar temples.

The Nandi mandapam has a fairly big statue of Nandi (the bull God), similar to those at Tanjore and Rameswaram. The unique feature of the temple is the 'Mani manadapam' located near the nandi mandapam with two giant pillars carved out of a single stone and each one is having 48 sub pillars which produce musical notes when struck. Tamil poet says that the pillars here are a combination of the Shruti Gana Laya types.

The composite columns of Virabhadra holding sword and horn are found be additions of the Vijayanayagara kings during the early 1500s. Similar columns of Virabhadra are found in Adikesava Perumal Temple at Thiruvattaru, Meenakshi Temple at Madurai, Kasi Viswanathar temple at Tenkasi, Krishnapuram Venkatachalapathy temple, Ramanathaswamy Temple at Rameswaram, Soundararajaperumal temple at Thadikombu, Srivilliputhur Andal temple, Srivaikuntanathan Permual temple at Srivaikuntam, Avudayarkovil, Vaishnava Nambi and Thirukurungudivalli Nachiar temple at Thirukkurungudi.

== Thaamira Ambalam ==
Tirunelveli also is one of the five places where Shiva is said to have displayed his dance and all these places have stages/ ambalams. While Tirunelveli has the Thaamira (Copper) Ambalam or Thamira Sabhai, the others are the Rathina Ambalam/ Rathna Sabhai at Thiruvaalangadu (rathinam – ruby / red), the Chitra Ambalam or Chitra Sabhai at Courtallam (chitra – painting), the Velli Ambalam or Rajatha Sabhai at Madurai Meenakshi Amman Temple (velli – silver) and the Pon (Gold) Ambalam or PorSabhai at Thillai Nataraja Temple, Chidambaram.

== Literary mention ==
Tirugnana Sambandar and Appar, the 7th-century Tamil Saivite poet Nayanmars, mentioned Nelliappar in ten verses in Tevaram, compiled as the First Tirumurai. Sundarar, an 8th-century nayanmar, also mentioned Idaiyatreeswarar in ten verses in Tevaram, compiled as the Fifth Tirumurai. As the temple is mentioned in Tevaram, it is classified as Paadal Petra Sthalam, one of the 276 temples in the Saiva canon. Muthuswami Dikshitar composed one song (Sri Kantimatim) on this temple goddess Kanthimathi Amman. This song is considered to be a rare song set in the rare raga Hemavathi.
