= Adikesava Perumal Temple, Thiruvattar =

Hindu temple in Tamil Nadu, India

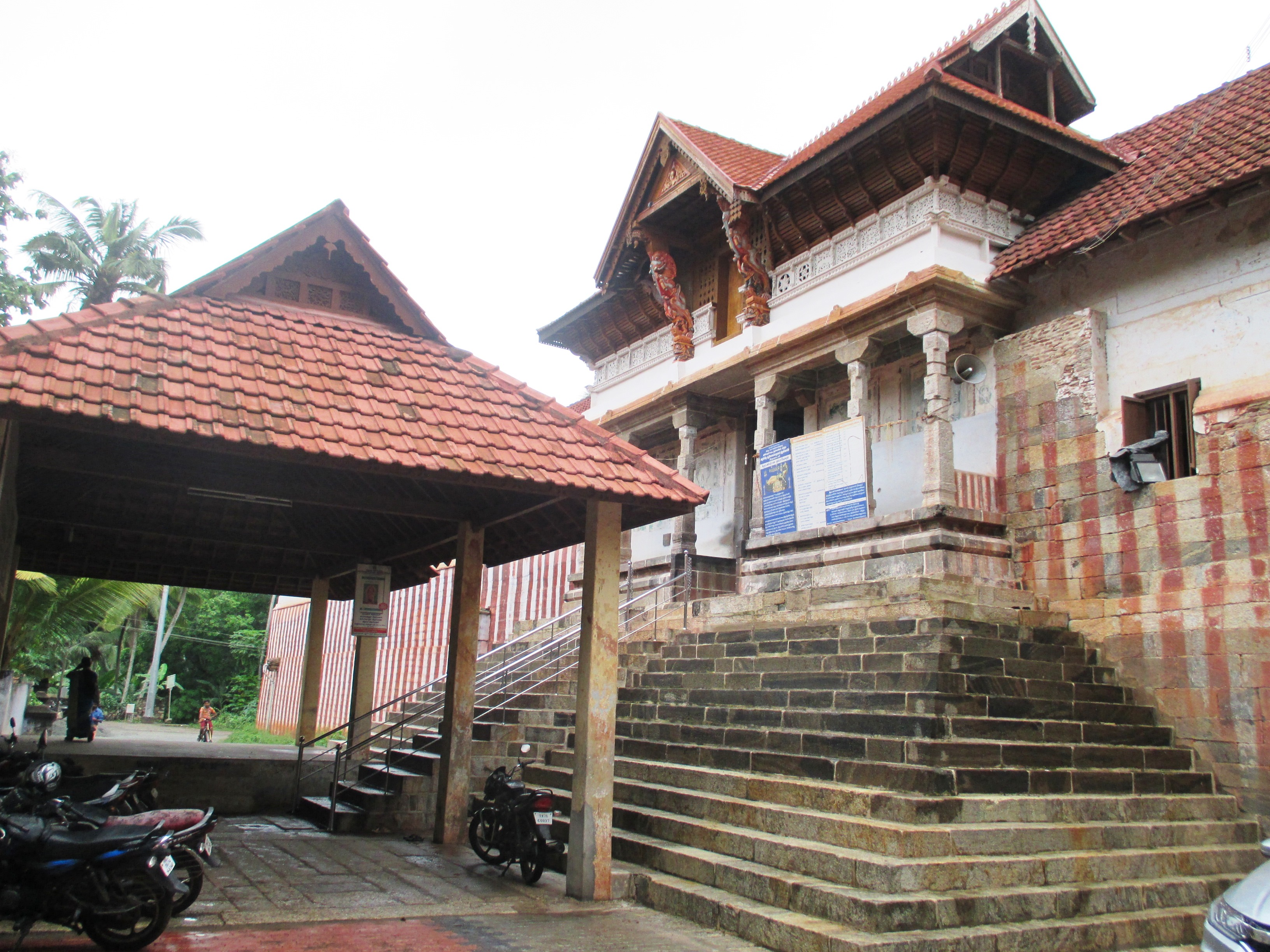

- Adikesava Perumal Temple, Thiruvattar, Kanyakumari district, Tamil Nadu

Religion
- Affiliation: Hinduism
- District: Kanyakumari
- Deity: Adikesava Perumal; Maragathavalli Thaayaar
- Festivals: Vaikuntha Ekadashi, Krishna Janmashtami

Location
- Location: Thiruvattar
- State: Tamil Nadu
- Country: India
- Interactive map of Adikesava Perumal Temple, Thiruvattar
- Coordinates: 8°19′47″N 77°15′57″E

Architecture
- Type: Dravidian architecture Kerala Style
- Temple: One

The Adikesava Perumal Temple is a Perumal temple located in Thiruvattar, Kanyakumari district, Tamil Nadu, India and is one of the 108 Divya desams, the holy sites of Hindu Vaishnavism in existing Tamil hymns from the seventh and eighth centuries CE. The temple is one of the historic thirteen Divya Desams of Malai Nadu. The temple is a picturesque setting surrounded on three sides by rivers namely, (River Kothai, River Pahrali and River Thamirabarani) It was the Rajya Temple and Bharadevatha shrine of Erstwhile Travancore. After state reorganisation, the temple was handed over to Tamil Nadu H&RCE Dept. Since Vishnu resides here in a reclining position, and is surrounded by rivers, the temple is called as "The Srirangam of Chera Kingdom".

The temple was consecrated by Parasurama and is admired by Veda vyasa in the sections which deal with temples in Padma Purana. As per the stone inscriptions which dates back to 779 KE the temple is established in the Treta yuga.

== Architecture and history ==
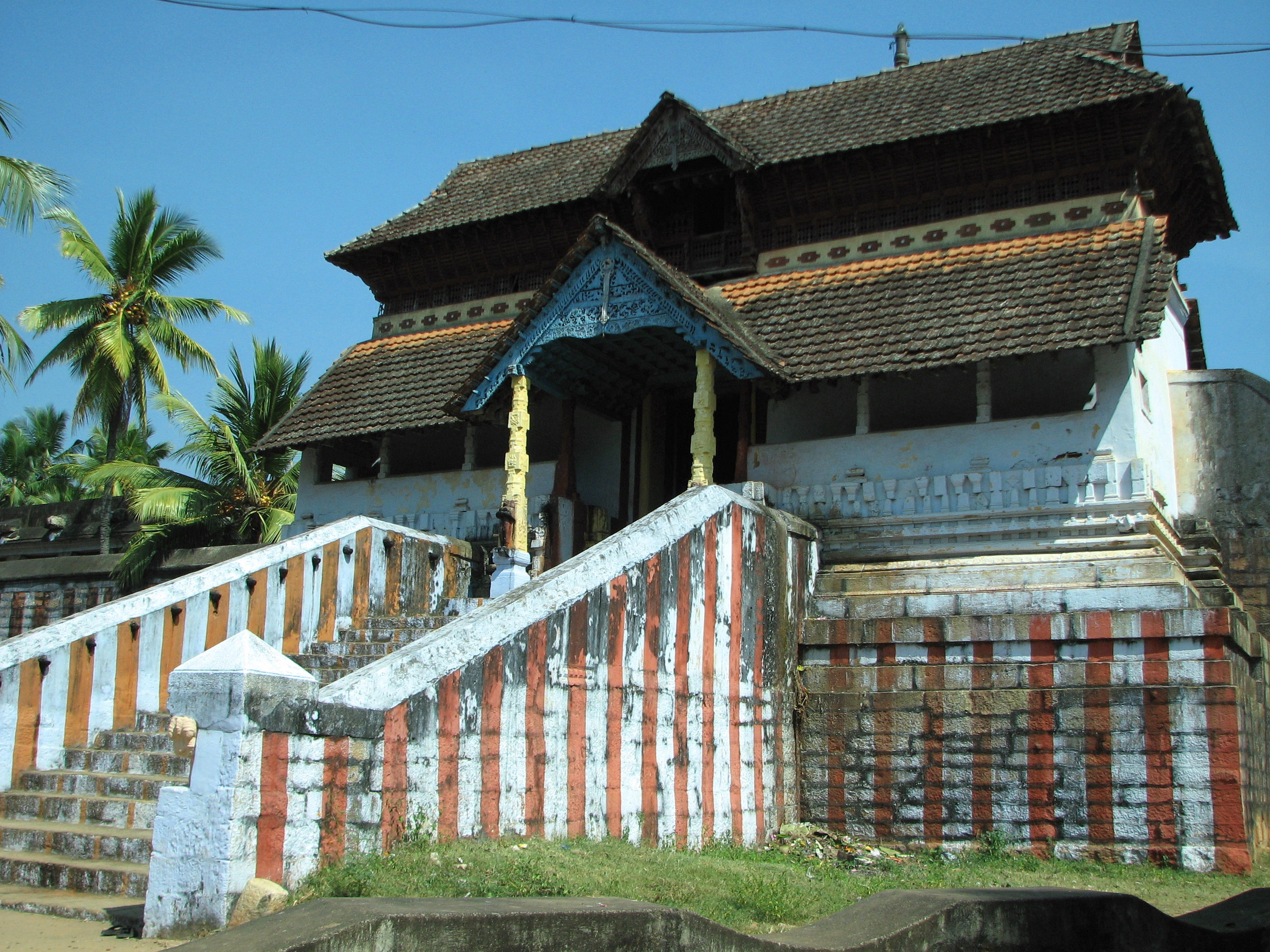
An old view of the temple

The temple architecture is a fusion of Dravidian and Kerala styles of architecture, with wooden pillars, doors and roofs. The Temple is surrounded by a thirty-feet-high fort wall. The outer corridor stand on 224 stone pillars. The adjacent forward facing mandapams includes sculptures and art works which depicts events from Ramayana. It also portrays Gods and Goddesses from Hindu mythology including Shiva, Parvati and Sri Krishna etc. The Lord is lying on His snake couch and has to be viewed through three doors. Lord Shiva is near Lord Adikesava Perumal inside the sannidhi. Deepalakshmis are many but none resembles the other. The Otraikkal Mandapam (single stone hall) is made of a single stone 3 feet thick. Oorthuva Thandavam, Venugopala, Rathi, Manmatha, Lakshmana and Indrajit are all excellently carved. The temple is also renowned for its murals.

The composite columns of Virabhadra, holding a sword and a horn, are found be additions by the Vijayanagara kings in the early 1500s. Similar columns of Virabhadra are found in Meenakshi Temple at Madurai, Nellaiappar Temple at Tirunelveli, Kasi Viswanathar temple at Tenkasi, Krishnapuram Venkatachalapathy temple, Ramanathaswamy Temple at Rameswaram, Soundararajaperumal temple at Thadikombu, Srivilliputhur Andal temple, Srivaikuntanathan Perumal temple at Srivaikuntam, Avudayarkovil, Vaishnava Nambi and Thirukurungudivalli Nachiar temple at Thirukkurungudi.

The temple complex includes a Ayyappan temple behind which stands the Ksetra bala Balikkal. It also includes Sree Bali Prakaram and the Yanaikottil. Other deities being located in the south-western corner, the flagmast is located at the west at the Sree Balippura. As per the stone inscriptions in the pedestal of the flag mast it was renovated by Sree Moolam Thirunal Rama Varma VI in 1071 KE. The granite entrance of the Chitra Sabha includes sculptures of the Dwara Palakas known as Jaya and Vijaya. Sculptures of Lakshmana and Pathanjali Tandava carved to the left of Sabha Mandapam while that of Indrajith and Muralidhara and Kalabairava are carved to the right. The image of the chief deity in his sayana posture is sculpted on the wooden entrance door. Vatteluttu inscriptions of Shilpa Shastra are found in adjacent walls. It also includes details about the 11th century Chola King Rajendra Chola.

Sculptures of Rati and Manmadan are found opposite Udaya Marthanda Mandapam. The epic scenes Vinayaka Kalyanam, Bharata War and deities Varuna, Niriyati, Yama, Kubera, Indra, Agni, Brahma and Monks in penance are sculpted in a row above the Mandapam. A variety of mural painting are found along the walls of the inner prakarams. A secret passage leading to the Palace is found beneath the west of the inner prakarams which is covered with a large stone slab.

Going by extant legends, the temple is closely associated with the famous Sree Anantha Padmanabhaswamy Temple, Thiruvananthapuram. Thiruvananthapuram Sri Anantha Padmanabhaswamy temple deity lies in the direction as to see the Thiruvattar Adi kesava deity. The main deity was originally covered with gold kavachams in which diamonds and other precious stones were embedded which the Kerala kings had presented to the temple. There is also a small shrine for Lord Lakshmi Narasimhaswamy near the river and opposite to the Adikesava Perumal Temple. Alvar saint Nammalvar had sung 11 pasurams in praise of Adi Kesava Swamy in the 6th Thiruvai mozhi. There are Three temples related to Adikesava Perumal Temple.

=== Treasures and connections ===
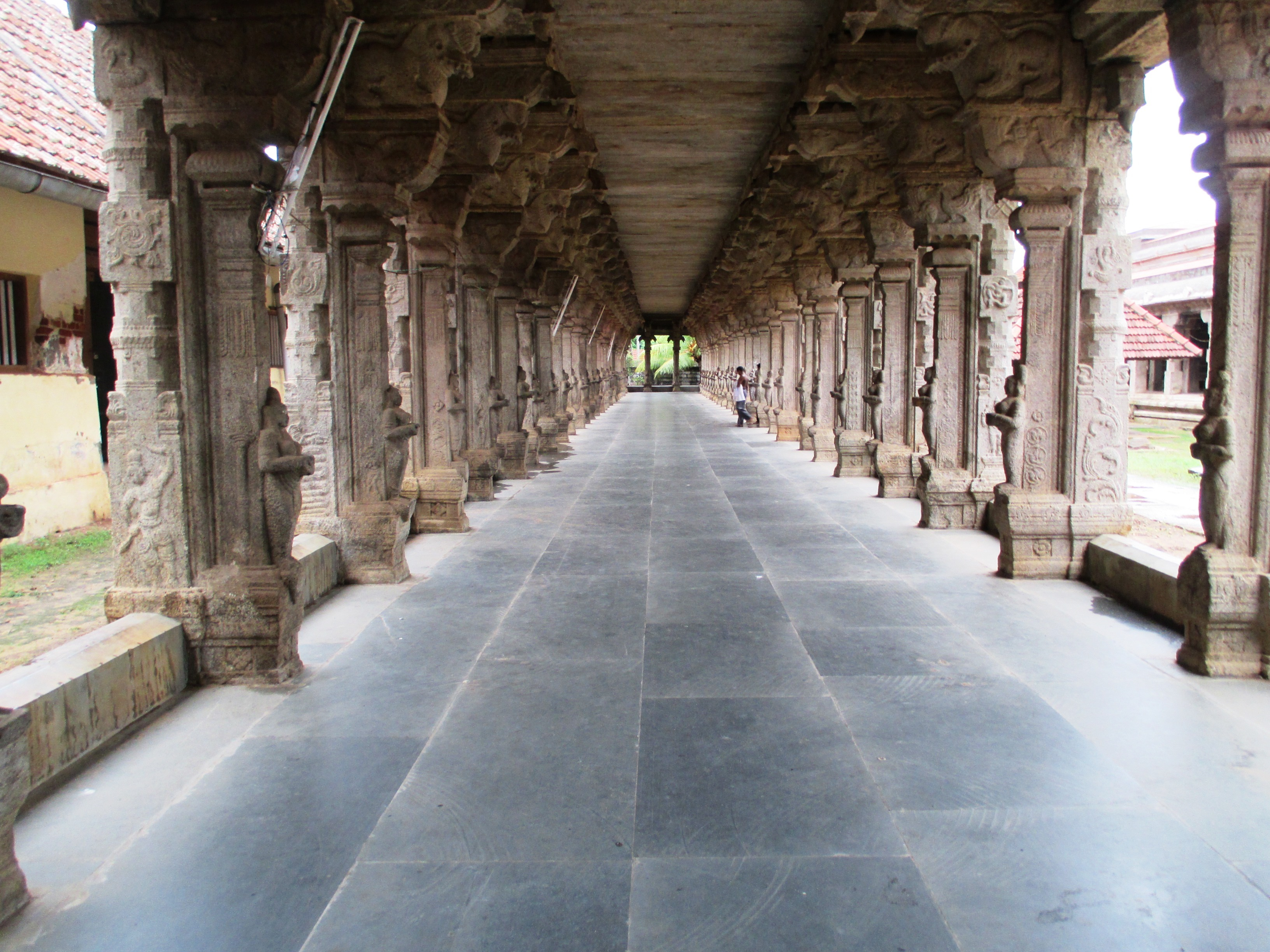
Pillared halls around the second precinct

The entire present day Kanyakumari District formed part of erstwhile Travancore Kingdom. Up to Marthanda Varma, all kings ruled the erstwhile Venad Kingdom (which was expanded by Marthanda Varma to form Thiruvithaamkoor) from Padmanabhapuram in Kanyakumari District. It was Dharma Raja, the nephew and successor of Marthanda Varma, who shifted the capital to Thiruvananthapuram. Padmanabhapuram Palace, the erstwhile royal abode of Travancore Kings, is still preserved in all its glory and is situated at Padmanabhapuram in Kalkulam Taluk of Kanyakumari District. Marthanda Varma was a staunch devotee of Lord Adikesava and used to worship at the temple before all the major war campaigns undertaken by him.

The presiding Deities of Thiruvananthapuram and Thiruvattar had a deep connection which reflects in the quantitative measurement of commodities utilised etc. The Perumals of Thiruvattar and Thiruvananthapuram remain closely bound to each other with this closeness being mirrored not only in festivals which coincide, special days, and many rituals, but also in their structural patterns, including the Ottakkal Mandapam. In both cases the Moola Vigrahas are of Katu-Sarkara and are containing Salagramas. The strong affiliation of the Venad kings to both Thiruvattar and Thiruvananthapuram temples in their privileges and responsibilities provide ample evidence of enduring interconnections.

== Legend ==
The Lord AdiKesavaSwamy means 'Foremost Friend'. Legend says that Lord AdiKesavaSwamy defeated the demon Kesi. The demon's wife prayed to the River Ganges and to River Thamirabarani and created a destruction. But it was in vain and she surrendered to the Lord. Thus, the formation of the rivers made in a circle came to be known as Thiruvattaru.

On 10 June 1741, Anizham Tirunal Marthanda Varma, the then ruler of Travancore, before going for the Battle of Colachel offered 908 panams, yataghan and silk on the feet of Lord Adikesava and prayed for victory.

== Festivals and Prasadhams ==
Vaikunta Ekadesi is celebrated with pomp and glory. Paal Payasam (Milk Kheer), Aval and Appam are delicious prasadams at this temple. The pujas are done in the same manner as that of the Sri Padmanabhaswamy temple, Thiruvananthapuram.
