= Tirupperunturai =

Shiva temple in Tamil Nadu, India

Avudaiyarkoil
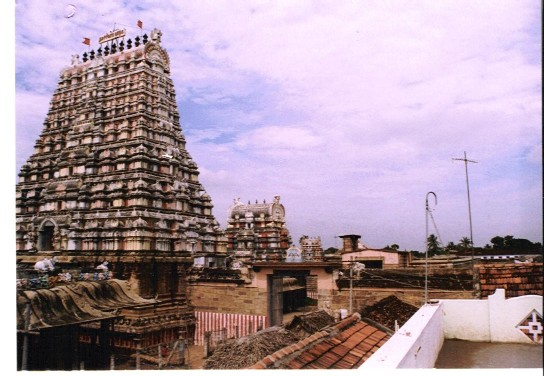

- Location in Tamil Nadu

Religion
- Affiliation: Hinduism
- District: Pudukkottai
- Deity: Athmanathar (Shiva)

Location
- Location: India
- State: Tamil Nadu
- Country: India
- Coordinates: 10°04′23″N 79°02′24″E

Architecture
- Type: Tamil architecture
- Creator: Manikkavacakar, Vikramaditya Chola

Thirupperunthurai (also called the Athmanathaswamy temple) is located in Avudaiyarkoil village, near Aranthangi in the Pudukkottai district of Tamil Nadu. It was built in 10 century to honor Lord Shiva. One of the sacred books of Tamil Saiva Siddhanta, Manikkavasagar's Tiruvasakam, originated from this shrine. Manikkavasagar is said to have converted the king to follow Shiva, and built the temple with money that had been intended for war-horses.

== Legend ==
The temple is supposed to have been built by Manickavasagar. As the prime minister, he was given money by King Varaguna Pandya II for the purpose of buying good horses in Chola Nadu, instead he spent it on building the temple. When Manickavasagar was confronted by the king for the lack of horses or money, Shiva displayed one of his thiruvilayadal, a divine sport, by transforming jackal to horses, which once they were given to the king became jackal again.

== Architecture ==
Athmanathar temple is a testimony to the temple architectural skills of ancient Hindu sculptors and engineers. This temple is specially known for the carvings of 27 Nakshatras or lunar stations. This temple also showcases the ancient Hindu knowledge of the human anatomy. On a closer look of lord Narsimha's idol, one can find that when he puts Hiranyakashipu on his thighs and claws his stomach, two intestines are gouged out indicating the large and small intestines. In modern science, the intestine was directly seen first in 1761 by Giovanni Battista Morgani.So, this Hindu knowledge of intestines astonishes the researchers. Similarly, the clear distinction between the anatomy of a child and an adult is visible in the idol of Lord Kartikeya where baby fat on his belly and chin bump are neatly carved out whereas the veins on Lord Narsimha's feet outline his adulthood, the no-veins on Kartikeya's feet clearly distinguish his childhood.

The temple covers an area of over 10 acres (40,000 m^{2}) with three enclosures and faces south, constructed so that the setting sun strikes the sanctum even though it is cloistered within three circumambulatory paths. The presiding deity is formless (Atmanatar); there is no Śivalingam but only a pedestal (Āvudayār) located in the sanctum, hence the name Avudayar Koil. The God faces South in this temple- in Dakshinamurthy or Guru form. His consort is worshipped as Śivayoganāyaki (Yogāmbāl) in iconless form. There is no Nandi bull icon as is conventional in almost all Shiva temples. There is deep spiritual significance in this. Hinduism allows deity worship for the novice. As one's devotion matures, one begins to contemplate the truth of formlessness of the Brahman. The temple has been designed to illustrate this theology. This one of the rarest Saivite shrine in whole of India to portray the supreme truth symbolically. Since the soul (athma) has no form, the deity is called Athmanathar. There are five lamps in the sanctum indicating the five time scales and 27 lamps indicating the 27 stars.

Tirupperunthurai is also known as Kokozhi, Śivapuram, Ākāśa Kailāsa, Vadavūr, Chaturvedamangalam and Ādi Kailāsa in Sangam literature. It is also known as Atīta Sabhā as it has six Sabhā-s, namely Kanakasabhā, Chitsabhā, Satsabhā, Ānandasabhā, Ratnasabhā and Devasabhā in comparison to five Sabhas at Chidambaram, each of these halls is named after Shaivite theological terms. These halls have exquisite carvings. It is believed that Manikkavacakar himself built these sabhas, and covered the Sabhas with 21600 plates of copper. Mother Parvathi in the Thillai Mandap in the second prakara granting the Pasupatha weapon to Arjuna as hunter and his wife is very realistic in workmanship. Mother appears with a chain around the neck, bangles in hand and holding a bag each carved in stone. Iron screws are use in some of the mantapams, which is unique for that age.

The temple is noted for the zephyr (granite) roof work. The ceiling of the Kanga sabhai (golden hall) is a grandeur creation in stone. The ropes, rafters and nails all are made of granite. The bow wielding Muruga, Kali and Siva's Rudra thandavam (wild dance) are the finest specimen in sculptural art. The five philosophies representing the Panchakshara the five letters – Na, Ma, Shi, Va, Ya – Nivrtti Kalā, Pratiśta Kalā, Vidya Kalā, Śānthi Kalā and Śāntyātīta Kalā are in sculpture form on the roof of the Panchakshara Mandap.

The composite columns of Virabhadra holding sword and horn are found be additions of the Vijayanayagara kings during the early 16th century. Similar columns of Virabhadra are found in Veerapthara swamy temple at Pasumbalur Village near Perambalur, Adikesava Perumal Temple at Thiruvattaru, Meenakshi Temple at Madurai, Nellaiappar Temple at Tirunelveli, Kasi Viswanathar temple at Tenkasi, Krishnapuram Venkatachalapathy temple, Ramanathaswamy Temple at Rameswaram, Soundararajaperumal temple at Thadikombu, Srivilliputhur Andal temple, Srivaikuntanathan Permual temple at Srivaikuntam, Vaishnava Nambi and Thirukurungudivalli Nachiar temple at Thirukkurungudi.

Many renovations have been carried out, much of the current structure dates to the 15th century CE. The thousand pillared hall has several delicately crafted pillars with depictions of the Oordhwa Tandavam of Shiva, Karaikal Ammaiyar, Dhanurdhara Subramanya, etc.

== Administration ==
As at Chidambaram and Tiruvanaikoil, here Vedic rituals are performed, unlike the Sivachariyar or Adhisaivar temples who follow Agama rituals. In this case the temple is administered by Nambiar Brahmins (not to be confused with Nair Nambiars or Brahmin Namboodaris) – a class of Vaideeka Brahmins said to be descendants of Rowshayadana, a saint who originated from Agni, and were taught the Vedas by Atmanathar Himself. They are said to number three hundred and are also called Munnothioruvar. This Agnivesha is also famous author of a magnificent ancient medical treatise called Agnivesha Kalpasutra spanning 77000 verses that discusses medicines and treatment for many types of diseases.

== Festival ==
Among the annual festivals celebrated here are Tirumanjanam (during the Tamil month of Aani, mid June - mid July) and Thiruvadirai (during the Tamil month of Margazhi mid December - mid January) each lasting ten days, similar to those festivals in the Chidambaram Nataraja Temple. Worship or pooja is done six times a day.
