= Krishnapuram Venkatachalapathy temple =

Krishnapuram Venkatachalapathy Temple
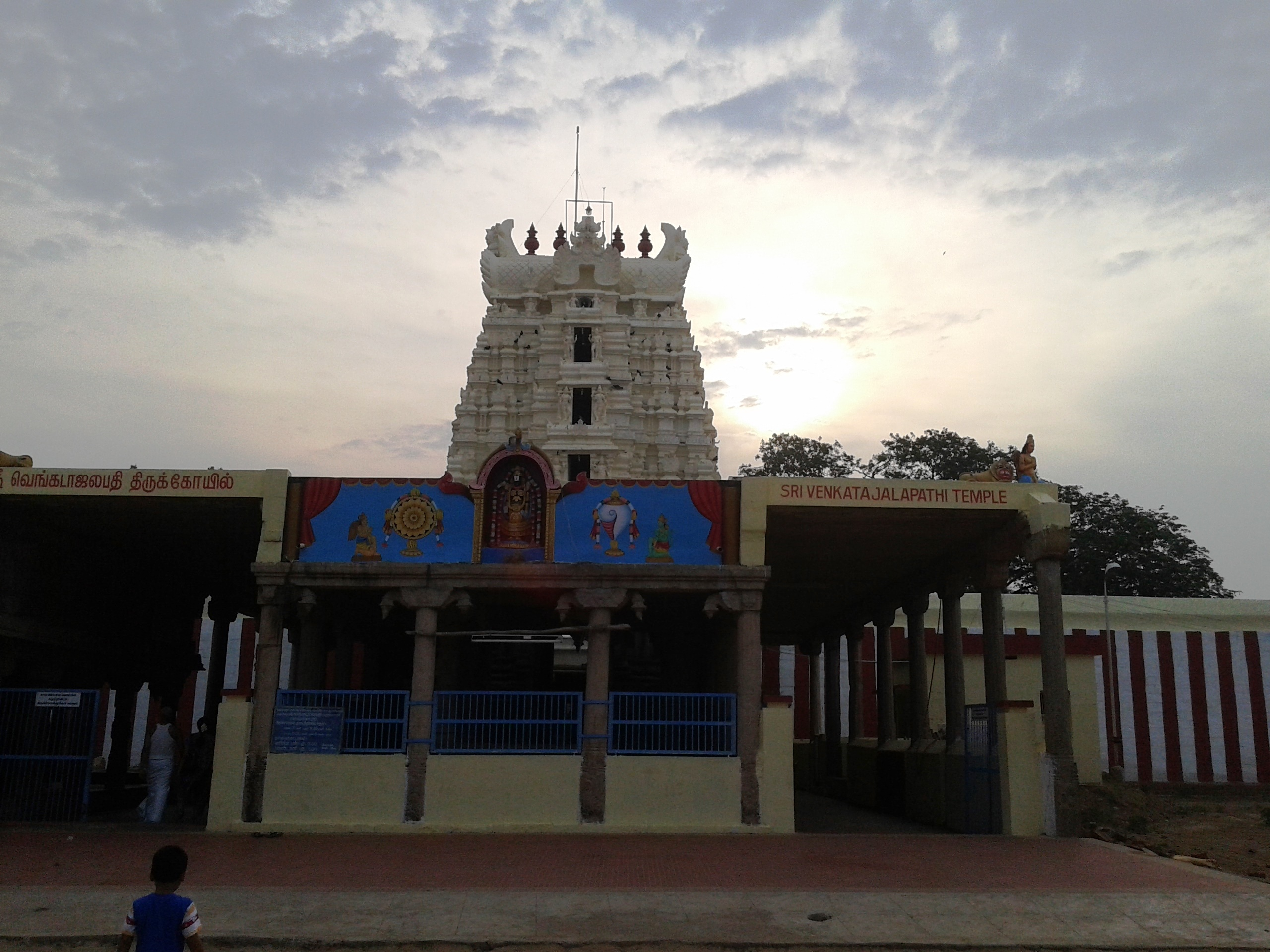

- Location in Tamil Nadu

Religion
- Affiliation: Hinduism
- District: Tirunelveli
- Deity: Venkatachalapathy (Vishnu); Alamelumangai (Lakshmi)

Location
- Location: Krishnapuram
- State: Tamil Nadu
- Country: India
- Coordinates: 8.689°N 77.804°E

Architecture
- Type: Dravidian architecture

Krishnapuram Venkatachalapathy temple (also called Krishnapuram Temple) in Krishnapuram, a village in Tirunelveli district in the South Indian state of Tamil Nadu, is dedicated to the Hindu god Vishnu. It is located 10 km from Tirunelveli. Constructed in the Dravidian style of architecture, the temple is a storehouse of Nayak architecture.

A granite wall surrounds the temple, enclosing all its shrines. The temple has a five tiered rajagopuram, the temple's gateway tower. The Vijayanagar and Nayak kings commissioned pillared halls and major shrines of the temple during the 16th century.

The temple follows Thenkalai tradition of worship. Four daily rituals and three yearly festivals are held at the temple, of which the ten-day annual Vaikunta Ekadasi during the Tamil month of Margazhi (December - January). The temple is maintained and administered by the Hindu Religious and Endowment Board of the Government of Tamil Nadu.

== History ==
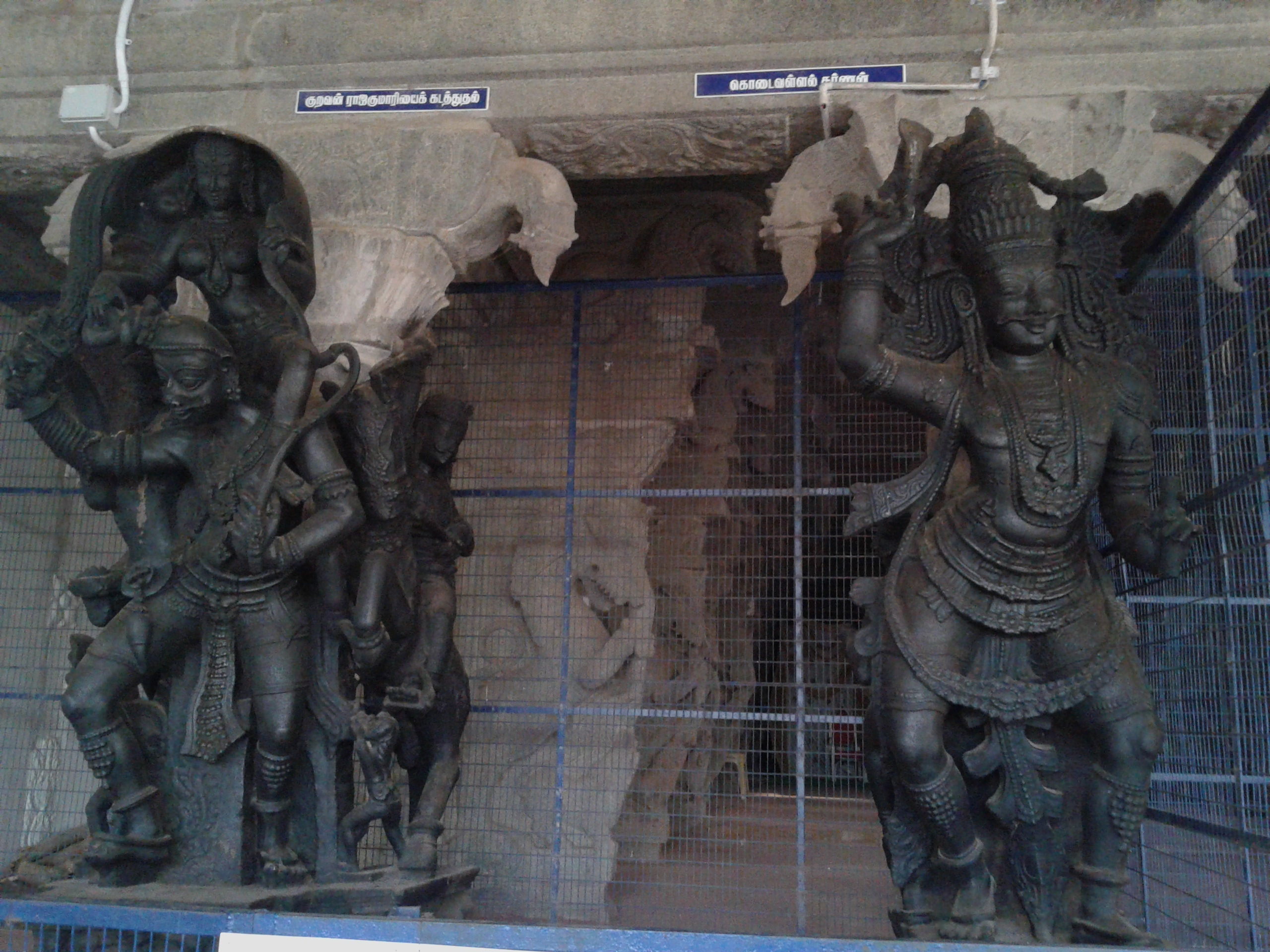
Sculptures in the temple

There is one inscription in the temple and five copper plates from the 16th century indicating various grants to the temple. It is understood from the inscriptions that the temple was built by Krishnappa Nayak (1563–72), the son of Viswanatha Nayak, the founder of Madurai Nayak dynasty. Krishnappa is attributed to the construction of the precincts around the temple and the soaring temple tower. Krishnappa Nayak also laid four streets around the temple for the smooth passing of the temple car. The village was originally named Thiruvenkatapuram and got changed to Krishnapuram during the rule of Krishanppa Nayak. Deivachillayar (Mayilerum perumal), the son-in-law of the minister of Viswanatha, played a key role in the construction of the temple. Detailed account of his work in the temple is extolled in Deivachillayar vidu thoothu by Kumaraswamy Avadaniyar and also in the History of Tinnelvelly by Caldwell.

The copper plates from Sadasiva Raya of Vijayanagara Empire indicate grants to light lamps perpetually and lay gardens. There were six villages to allow the continuous functioning of the temple. The villages Ariyakulam, Kodikulam, Kuthukaval, Puthaneri, Pottukalam, Sriramakulam and Alikudi were donated to the temple for the performance of daily poojas. An Agraharam with housing for 108 Brahmin families well-versed in Vedas and agamas was established.

The temple was originally administered as a subtemple of Ramaswamy temple of Tirunelveli, but came under the administration of Nelliappar temple from 1973. It came under the dominion of Tiruchendur Devastanam from 1986.

== Architecture ==
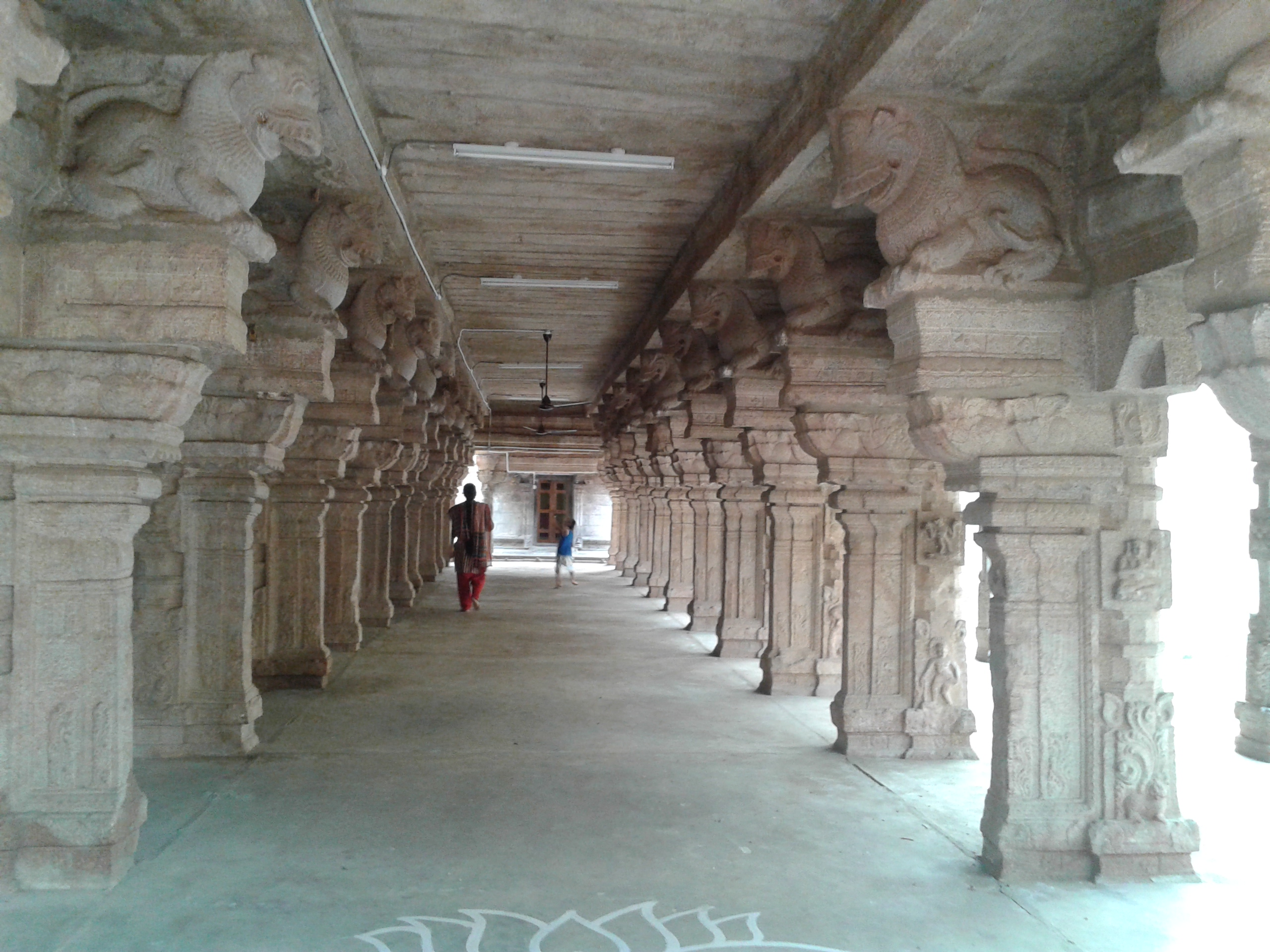
Pillared hall in the temple

The temple occupies an area of 1.8 acres (0.73 ha) and is surrounded by a granite walls. The temple had originally three precincts, the outer one of which was demolished by Chanda Sahib at the orders of Nawab of Arcot. The stones were used to build the fort at Palayamkottai. The five tiered rajagopuram, the temple's gateway tower, is 110 ft (34 m) tall. The sanctum houses the image of Venkatachalapathy in standing posture 4 ft (1.2 m) is made of granite sporting four arms. Two of his arms hold the conch and Chakra, while the other two sport Abayamudra and Kadahasta. The images of Sridevi and Bhudevi are located on either of his side. The festive image is called Srinivasan and the image has identical features as that of the presiding deity. The Ardha mandapa is guarded by two Dwarapalas on either sides. There is a separate shrine of Alamelumangai in the third precinct, which also houses the festival image.

There are many halls in the temple namely the Pandal mantap, Vahana mandap, Ranga Mandap an Nanguneri Jeeyar mandap. The Pandal mandap has pillars replete with architectural features displaying pushpaboikai, palagai, and varikolam. The Unjal mandap is designed to accommodate the swing for the festival deities. The square shaped Vasantha mandap has Navarang style. The temple houses rare sculptures from the Nayak period in the Veerappa Nayak Mandap. There are exquisite carvings in the pillars and life size images indicating various legends of Hindu Puranas. The Jeeyar mandap houses lot of pillars with images of ladies hold lamps as in Kerala temples. The seer of temples used to rest at this place during festivals. The Sorga vasal (gateway to heaven) is located to the west of Yagasalai Mandap and is open only during the ten-day Vaikunta Ekadasi festival. Manimandap has numerous pillars with sculptures of elephants and yalis. The composite columns of Virabhadra holding sword and horn are found be additions of the Vijayanayagara kings during the early 1500s. Similar columns of Virabhadra are found in Adikesava Perumal Temple at Thiruvattaru, Meenakshi Temple at Madurai, Nellaiappar Temple at Tirunelveli, Kasi Viswanathar temple at Tenkasi, Ramanathaswamy Temple at Rameswaram, Soundararajaperumal temple at Thadikombu, Srivilliputhur Andal temple, Srivaikuntanathan Permual temple at Srivaikuntam, Avudayarkovil, Vaishnava Nambi and Thirukurungudivalli Nachiar temple at Thirukkurungudi.

== Festival ==
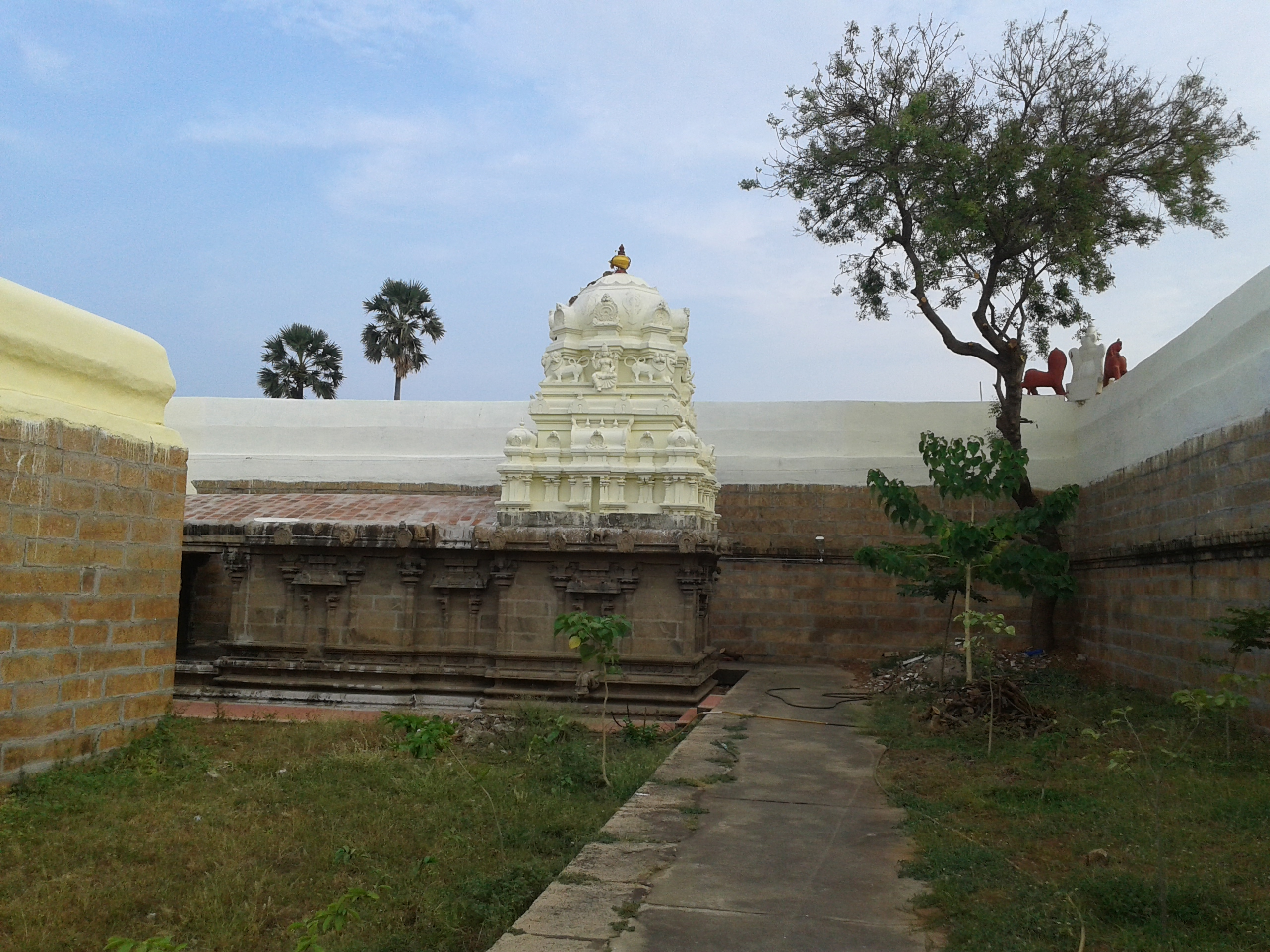
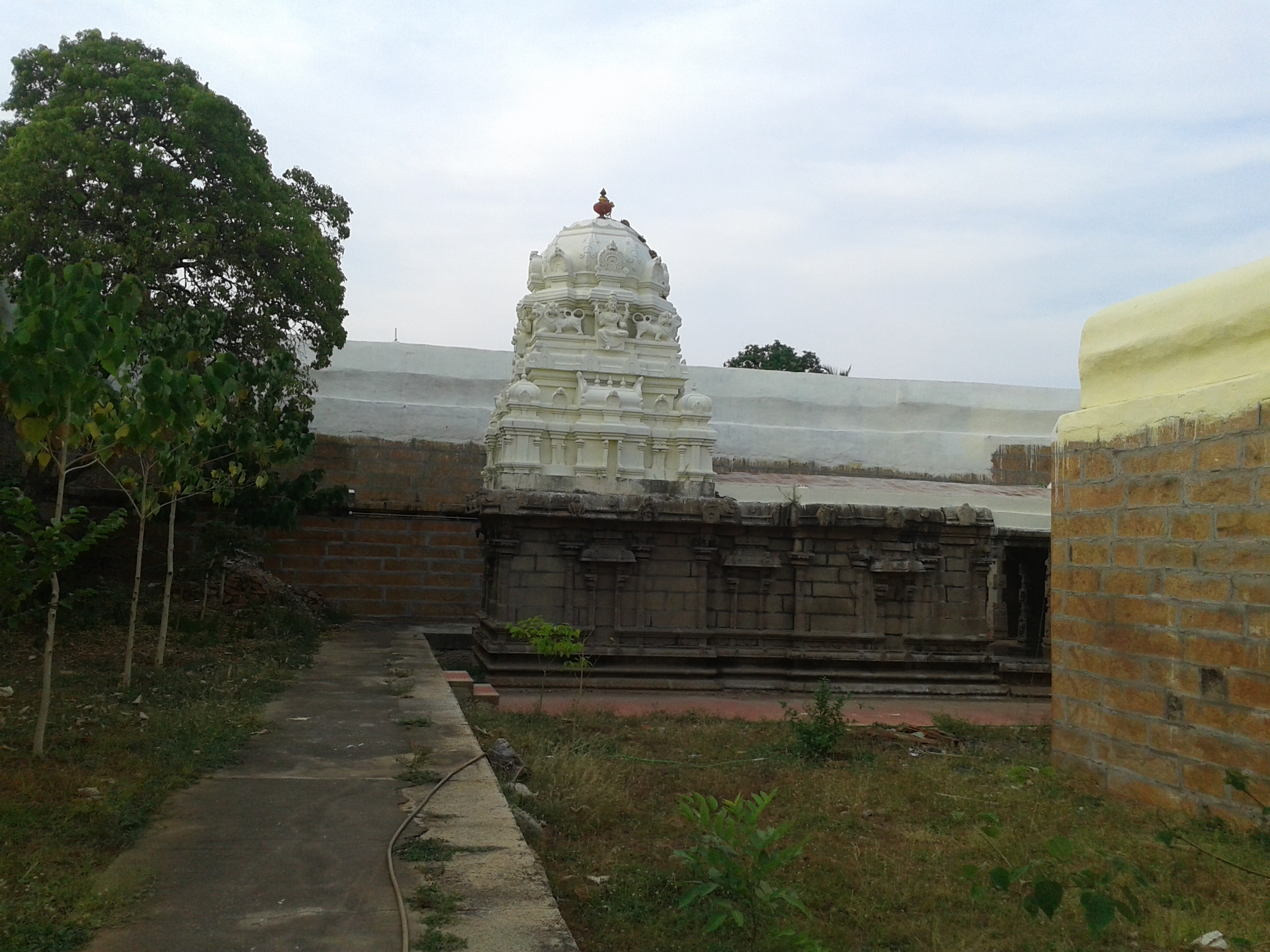
Shrines of Alamelumanga and Padmavathi

The temple follows the traditions of the Thenkalai sect of Vaishnavite tradition and follows Pancharathra aagama. It is inferred from the inscriptions that the temple priests performed pooja five times a day during the 16th century, strictly following agamic tradition. In modern times, the temple priests perform the pooja (rituals) during festivals and on a daily basis. There are weekly, monthly and fortnightly rituals performed in the temple.

The temple had originally received endowments to perform the eleven-day annual Brahmotsavam festival, ending with Teppotsavam, the float festival. The festivals are not celebrated during modern times. The ten-day annual Vaikunta Ekadasi during the Tamil month of Margazhi (December - January) is the major festival celebrated in the temple, along with the other common Vaishnavite festivals.
