= Vaishnava Nambi and Thirukurungudivalli Nachiar temple =

Vishnu temple in Tirunelveli

Vaishnava Nambi and Thirukurungudivalli Nachiar Temple
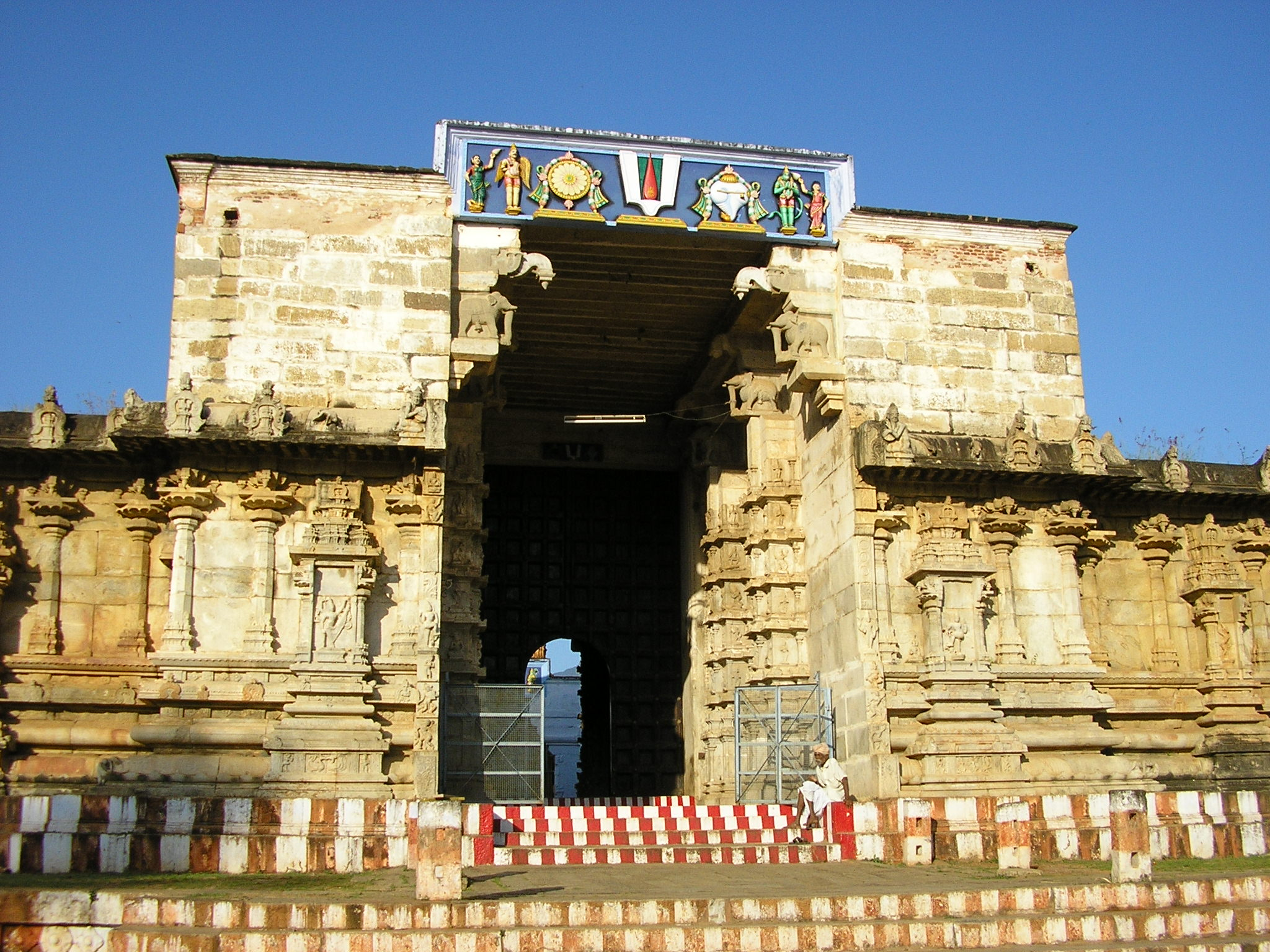

- Location in Tamil Nadu

Religion
- Affiliation: Hinduism
- District: Tirunelveli
- Deity: Vaishnava Nambi (Vishnu) Neela Devi (Lakshmi)

Location
- Location: Thirukkurungudi
- State: Tamil Nadu
- Country: India
- Coordinates: 8°26′09″N 77°33′58″E

Architecture
- Type: Dravidian architecture

Vaishnava Nambi and Thirukurungudivalli Nachiar Temple in Thirukkurungudi, a village in Tirunelveli district in the South Indian state of Tamil Nadu, is dedicated to the Hindu god Vishnu. It is located 45 km from Tirunelveli. Constructed in the Dravidian style of architecture, the temple is glorified in the Naalayira Divya Prabandham, the early medieval Tamil canon of the Alvar saints from the 6th–9th centuries CE. It is one of the 108 Divya Desams dedicated to Vishnu, who is worshipped as Vaishnava Nambi and his consort Lakshmi as Thirukurungudivalli. The temple is locally referred as Dakshina Vaikuntam, the holy abode of Vishnu.

A granite wall surrounds the temple, enclosing all its shrines and two of its three bodies of water. The rajagopuram, the temple's gateway tower, is 110 ft (34 m) tall. Vaishnava Nambi is believed to have appeared to slay the asura Somuka who abducted the four Vedas. The temple follows Tenkalai tradition of worship. Six daily rituals and three yearly festivals are held at the temple, of which the ten-day annual Brahmotsavam during the Tamil month of Chittirai (April - May) and Brahmotsavam during the month of Chittirai, being the most prominent. The temple is maintained and administered by the Hindu Religious and Endowment Board of the Government of Tamil Nadu.

== Legend ==
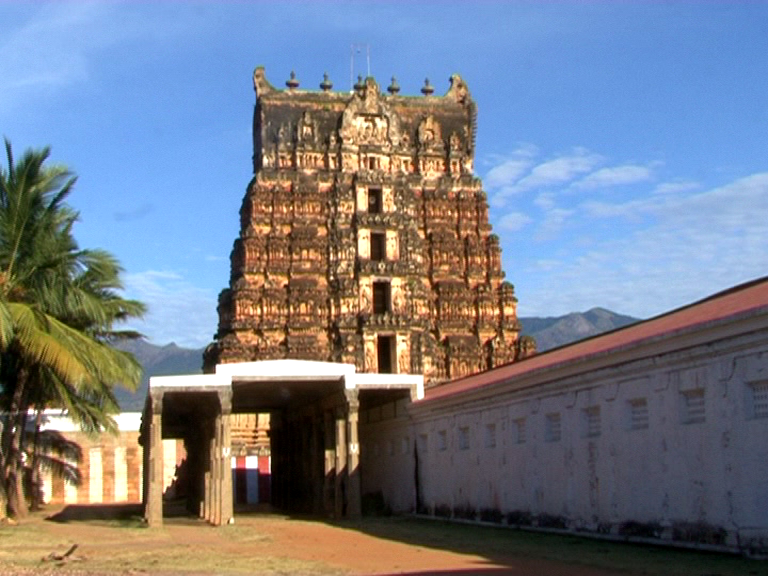
Image of the temple tower

As per accounts in the Varaha Purana, a treatise of Varaha, an avatar of Vishnu, Varaha preferred to stay at this place with his consort Varahi in a small form and hence came to be known as Thirkurungudi (literally meaning a small house).

As per a Hindu legend, Nambaduvan, a peasant and singer (locally called panan) from lower section of the society, was an ardent devotee of Vishnu. On account of his low life, he never entered the temple and worshipped from outside. While walking towards the temple one day, he was stopped by an asura. He sang the verses which he set for the presiding deity to him. He also assured the asura that he will come back from the temple when the asura can consume him. Nambi, the presiding deity was pleased by his devotion and appeared outside the temple. While returning, Nambi appeared as a Brahmin and tried to convince him to escape the asura. But Nambudavan was staunch and wanted to be true to his promise. The asura was pleased by the songs and said it did not want to consume him anymore. It is believed that the asura was a Brahmin who was cursed during his previous birth as he was not sincere doing his penance. He was relieved off his curse listening to the songs of Nambaduvan.

It is also said that Nammalwar, who was born in Azhwar Thirunagari, was a reincarnation of this deity.

== Architecture ==
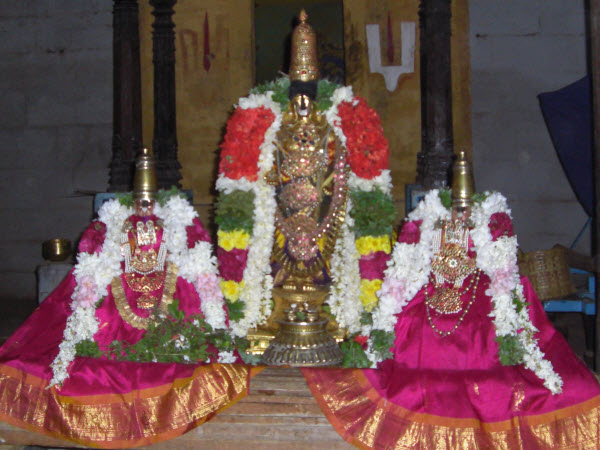
Image of festival deities

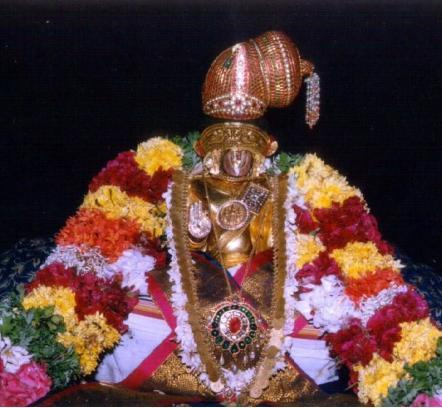
Image of Nammazhwar

Vaishnava Nambi temple is located in Thirukkurungudi, a village in Tirunelveli district in the South Indian state of Tamil Nadu. It is located 45 km (28 mi) from Tirunelveli and 11 km (6.8 mi) from Nanguneri. The temple has a flat entrance tower and a five-tiered gopuram (gateway tower). The temple has five prakarams, closed precincts of a temple and all the shrines are enclosed in the first two enclosures. The temple occupies around 7.5 ha (18.5 acres). There are a number of halls, that have sculpted pillars from the Nayak period. There is a festival hall in the second precinct in the temple facing South that has sculpted pillars indicating various Hindu legends. The most notable of them being a legend of Mahabharata where Bhima attacks a lion legged person with his club. The composite columns of Virabhadra holding sword and horn are found be additions of the Vijayanayagara kings during the early 1500s. Similar columns of Virabhadra are found in Adikesava Perumal Temple at Thiruvattaru, Meenakshi Temple at Madurai, Nellaiappar Temple at Tirunelveli, Kasi Viswanathar temple at Tenkasi, Krishnapuram Venkatachalapathy temple, Ramanathaswamy Temple at Rameswaram, Soundararajaperumal temple at Thadikombu, Srivilliputhur Andal temple, Srivaikuntanathan Permual temple at Srivaikuntam and Avudayarkovil.

In Tamil language the word Nambi means personification of all virtuous and righteous qualities blended with beauty and grace. There are five Nambis in this Kshetram. They are Ninra Nambi (Standing posture), Irundha Nambi (Sitting posture), Kidandha Nambi (Sleeping posture), Thiruparkadal Nambi and Thirumalai Nambi. Thiruparkadal Nambi Temple is located near to the River Nambiyaru, one km from the main temple. Thirumalai Nambi Temple is on the hills (Mahendragiri Mountain) 8 km from the main temple.

== Digital preservation ==
In August 2023, the temple was the subject of a digital preservation project. A Matterport Pro2 3D scanner was used to record the temple's art and architecture.

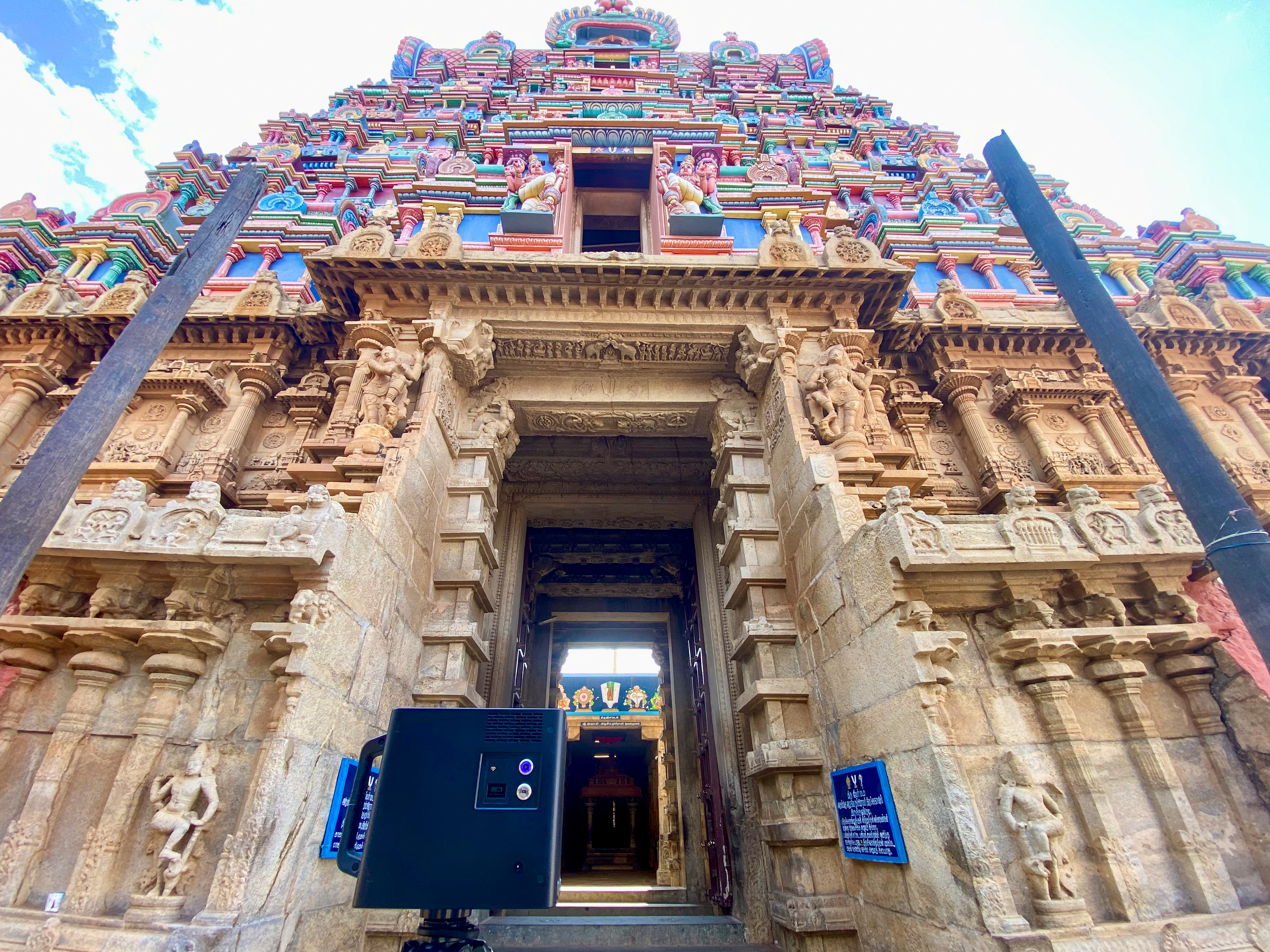
A 3D scanner positioned to capture the main rajagopuram (tower).

== History ==
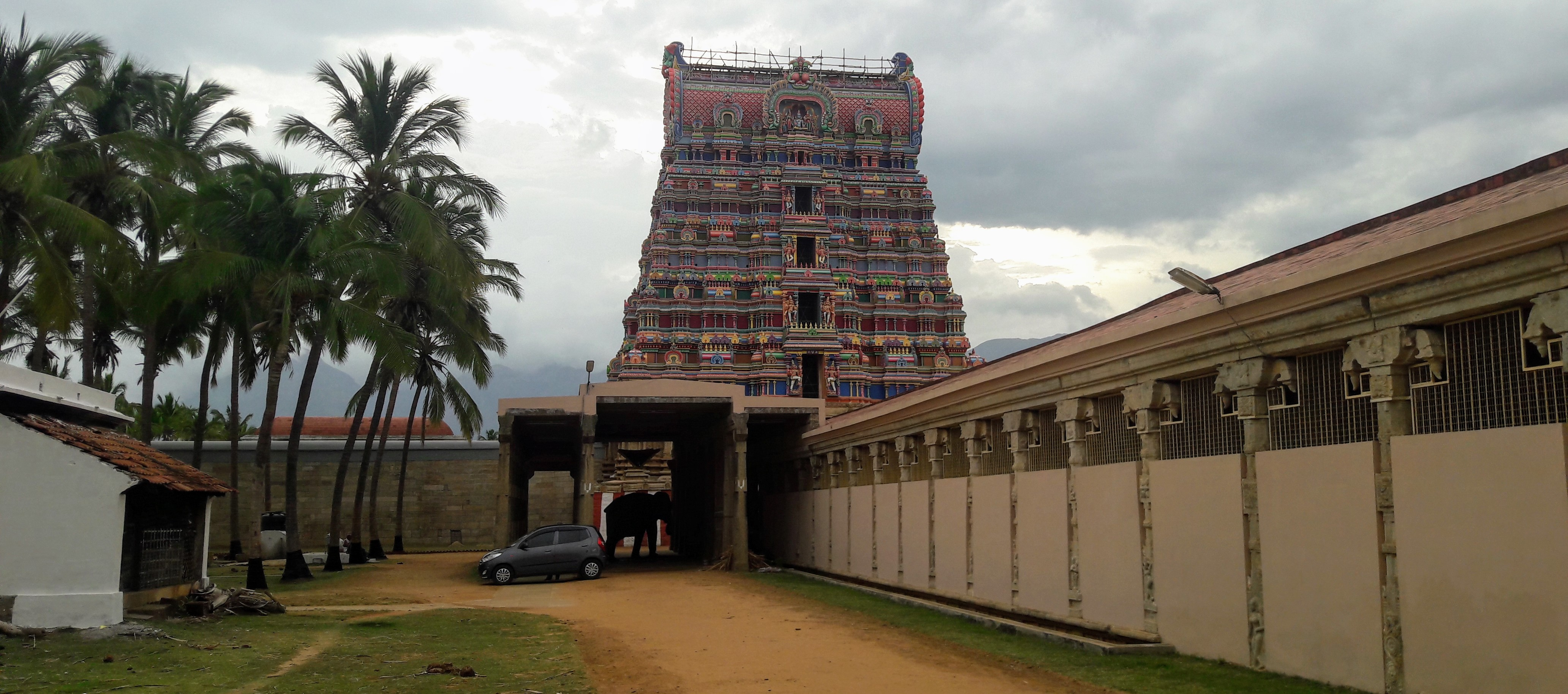
Temple tower

The temple has inscriptions from the 10th century during the Medieval Chola period indicating grants to the temple in the form of sheep. Another inscription from the 14th century is attributed to Sundara Pandya II indicating gifts of 25 cows for the perpetual lighting of ghee lamps in the temple. There are also inscriptions from the same regime indicating gift of lands to the temple. The Nayak period during the 15th century saw lot of additions to the temple complex in terms of pillared halls. The inscriptions on the southern wall of the hall dated 1059 indicates excavation of a channel with dams. There are similar inscriptions on the northern wall indicating repairs made to the same dam. There are two unreadable inscriptions on two pillars of the temple. There are three copper plate inscriptions in the temple dated 1456, 1537 and 1592 indicating grants from Sabala Veera Chandra Ramavarma Maharaja, Vittala Raya of Vijayanagara Empire and Vira Vasantha Venkatadeva Maharaja respectively indicating several grants to the temple.

== Religious significance ==
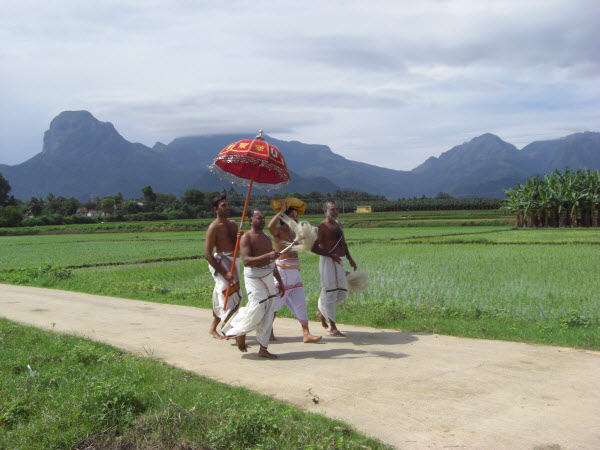
Image of the temple priests carrying the image of festival deity

The temple is revered in Naalayira Divya Prabandham, the 7th–9th century Vaishnava canon, by Periyalvar, Nammalvar, Thirumangai Alvar and Thirumalisai Alvar. The temple is classified as a Divya Desam, one of the 108 Vishnu temples that are mentioned in the book. During the 18th and 19th centuries, the temple finds mention in several works like 108 Tirupathi Anthathi by Divya Kavi Pillai Perumal Aiyangar. It is believed that Thirumangai Alvar spent his last days in this place and attained Moksha. The place is thus referred as Dakshina Vaikuntam, the ultimate destination of Vaishnavites. A tradition of worshipping Vishnu through dance, music and art is called Kaisika Nataka is believed to have originated at Thirukkurungudi. A festival called Kaisika Ekadasi held at the temple every year. The local belief is that the devotees practising Kaisika Vratha or witnessing the performance would attain Moksha. Arayar Sevai, another form of worshipping Vishnu is also believed to have originated in this place. As per legend, the practise was established by Nathamuni, who was practising with his fellow mates and Vishnu was hiding in the South Mada street and enjoying the performance. Vishnu is also called as Gana Priyan, the one who enjoys music. It is believed that Ramanuja, the proponent of Vaishavadvaita philosophy taught Vishnu about Astakshara and hence the presiding deity came to be known as Vaishnava Nambi.

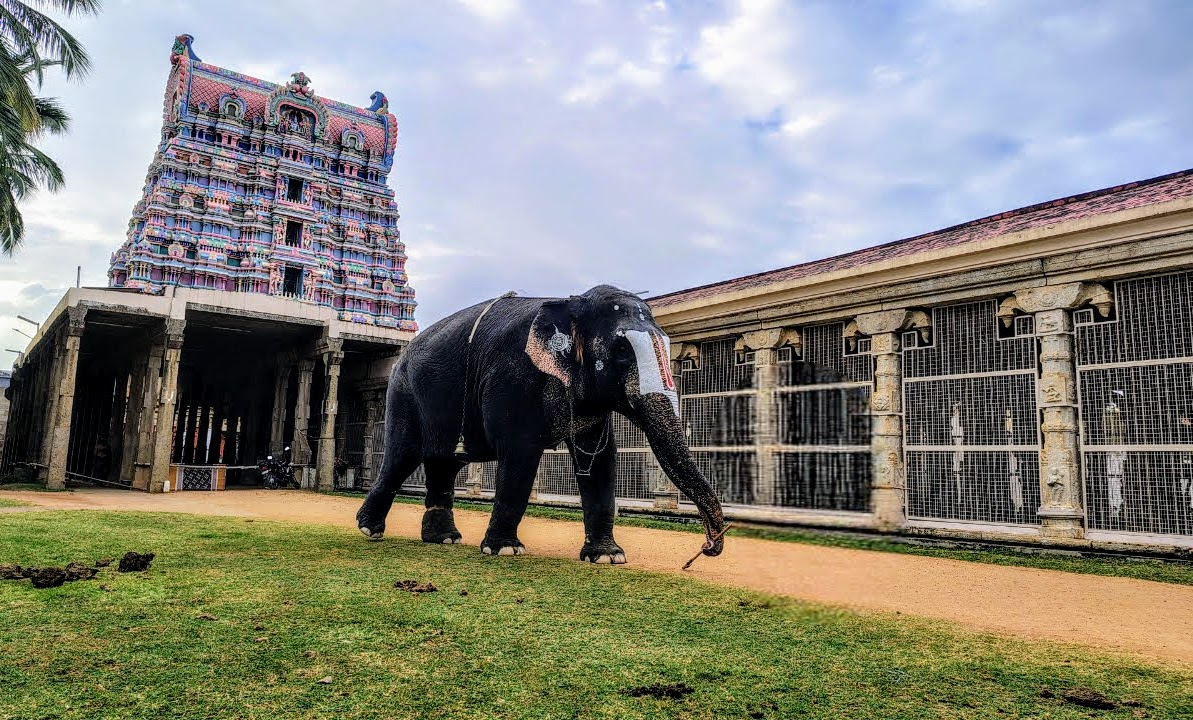
Thirukkurungudi temple elephant

== Festival ==
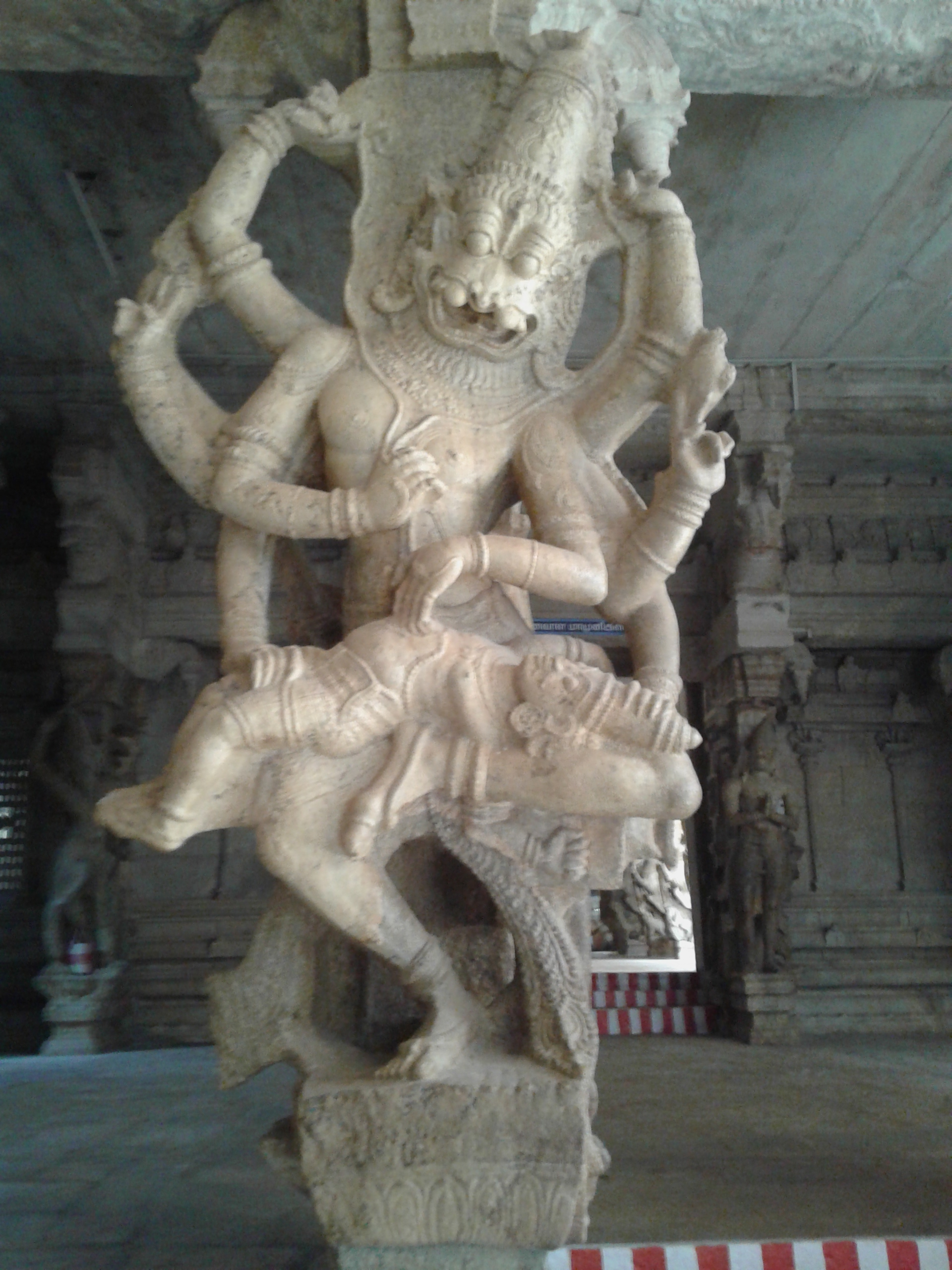
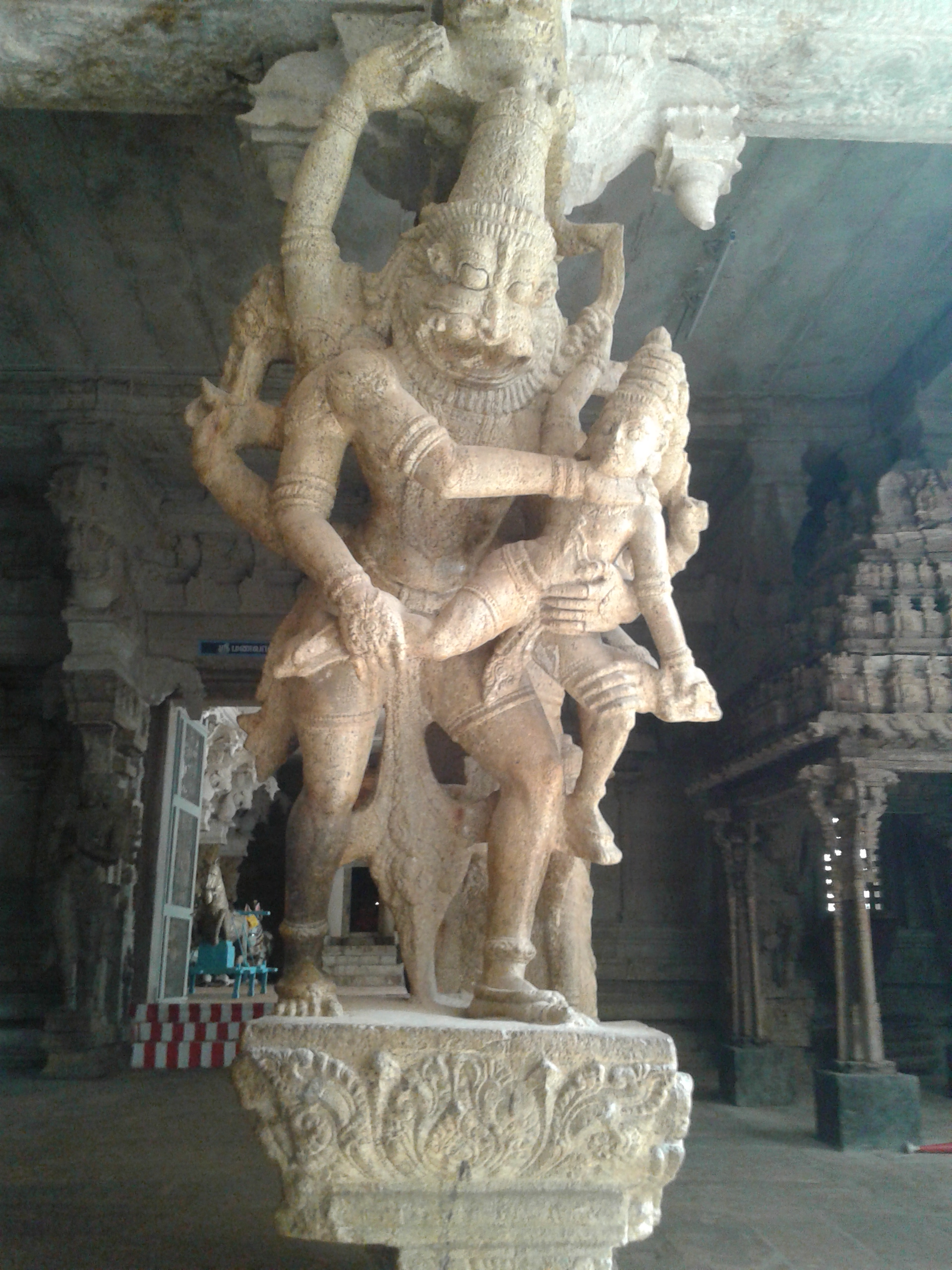
Images of Vishnu's avatar Narasimha slaying Hiranyakashipu

The Chittirai utsavam(festival) in the month of Chittirai (April - May), Vaikasi Jestabishekam during June, Aavani Pavithrotsavam during Aavani (August - September), Float festival during Thai (January - February) and Brahmostavam during March–April are the major festivals in the temple.

The temple follows the traditions of the Thenkalai sect of Vaishnavite tradition and follows Vaikanasa aagama. The temple priests perform the pooja (rituals) during festivals and on a daily basis. As at other Vishnu temples of Tamil Nadu, the priests belong to the Vaishnavaite community, a Brahmin sub-caste. The temple rituals are performed four times a day: Kalasanthi at 8:00 a.m., Uchikalam at 12:00 p.m., Sayarakshai at 6:00 p.m., and Ardha Jamam at 8:00 p.m. Each ritual has three steps: alangaram (decoration), neivethanam (food offering) and deepa aradanai (waving of lamps) for both Vaishnava Nambi and Thirukurungaivalli. During the last step of worship, nagaswaram (pipe instrument) and tavil (percussion instrument) are played, religious instructions in the Vedas (sacred text) are recited by priests, and worshippers prostrate themselves in front of the temple mast. There are weekly, monthly and fortnightly rituals performed in the temple.
