= Soundararajaperumal temple, Thadikombu =

Hindu temple in Dindigul

Soundararajaperumal Temple
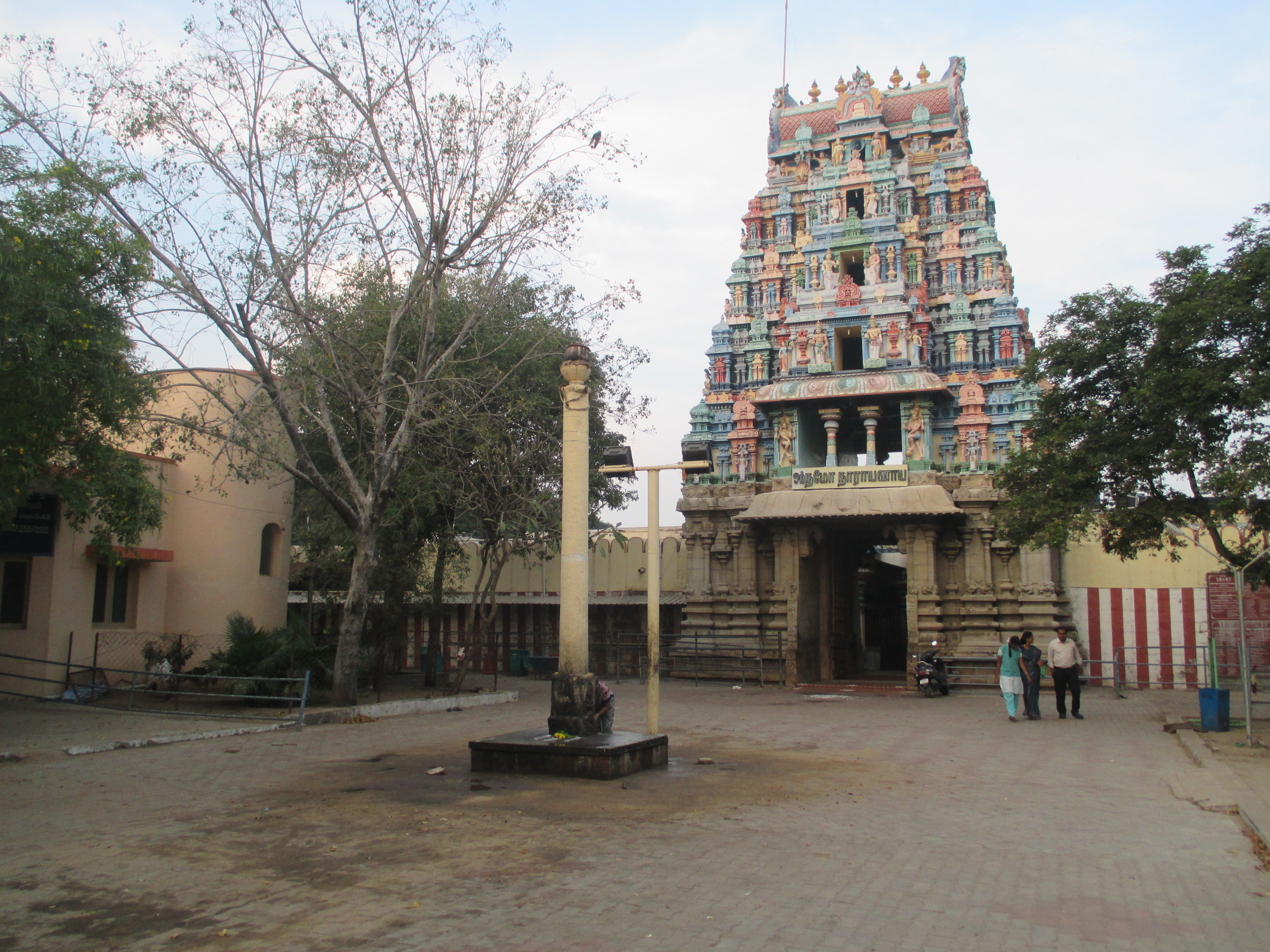

- Location in Tamil Nadu

Religion
- Affiliation: Hinduism
- District: Dindigul
- Deity: Soundararaja Perumal (Vishnu); Soundaravalli Thayar (Lakshmi)

Location
- Location: Thadikombu
- State: Tamil Nadu
- Country: India
- Coordinates: 10°26′23″N 77°57′14″E

Architecture
- Type: Dravidian architecture

The Soundararajaperumal Temple is a temple dedicated to Hindu god Vishnu, located in Thadikombu, a village near Dindigul in the South Indian state of Tamil Nadu. Constructed in Dravidian style of architecture, the temple is believed to have been built by Achyuta Deva Raya during the 16th century CE. Vishnu is worshipped as Soundararaja Perumal and his consort Lakshmi as Soundaravalli.

The temple is known for the Ranga Mandapam, which features rare life size sculptures. The temple has two inscriptions dating from the Nayak period. The temple has a five-tiered rajagopuram (gateway tower) and enshrined within a granite wall. The complex contains all the shrines and water bodies associated with it. The special features of the temple are a separate shrine for the Hindu deities of love, Manmatha and Rati.

Soundararaja Perumal is believed to have appeared for the sage Mandukya. The temple observes six daily rituals and three yearly festivals. The chariot festival, Bramotsavam is celebrated during the Tamil month of Aadi (July - August), is the most prominent festival of the temple. The temple is maintained and administered by the Hindu Religious and Endowment Board of the Government of Tamil Nadu.

== Legend ==
According to the temple's regional legend, once, a sage was cursed take the form of a frog (Mandukya) in the place around the temple. He was troubled by a demon, and the frog worshipped Vishnu for rescue. Vishnu was pleased by the devotion and saved the frog by killing the demon. Vishnu chose to stay at the place where he rescued the frog, which went on to become the site of the temple.

== History ==
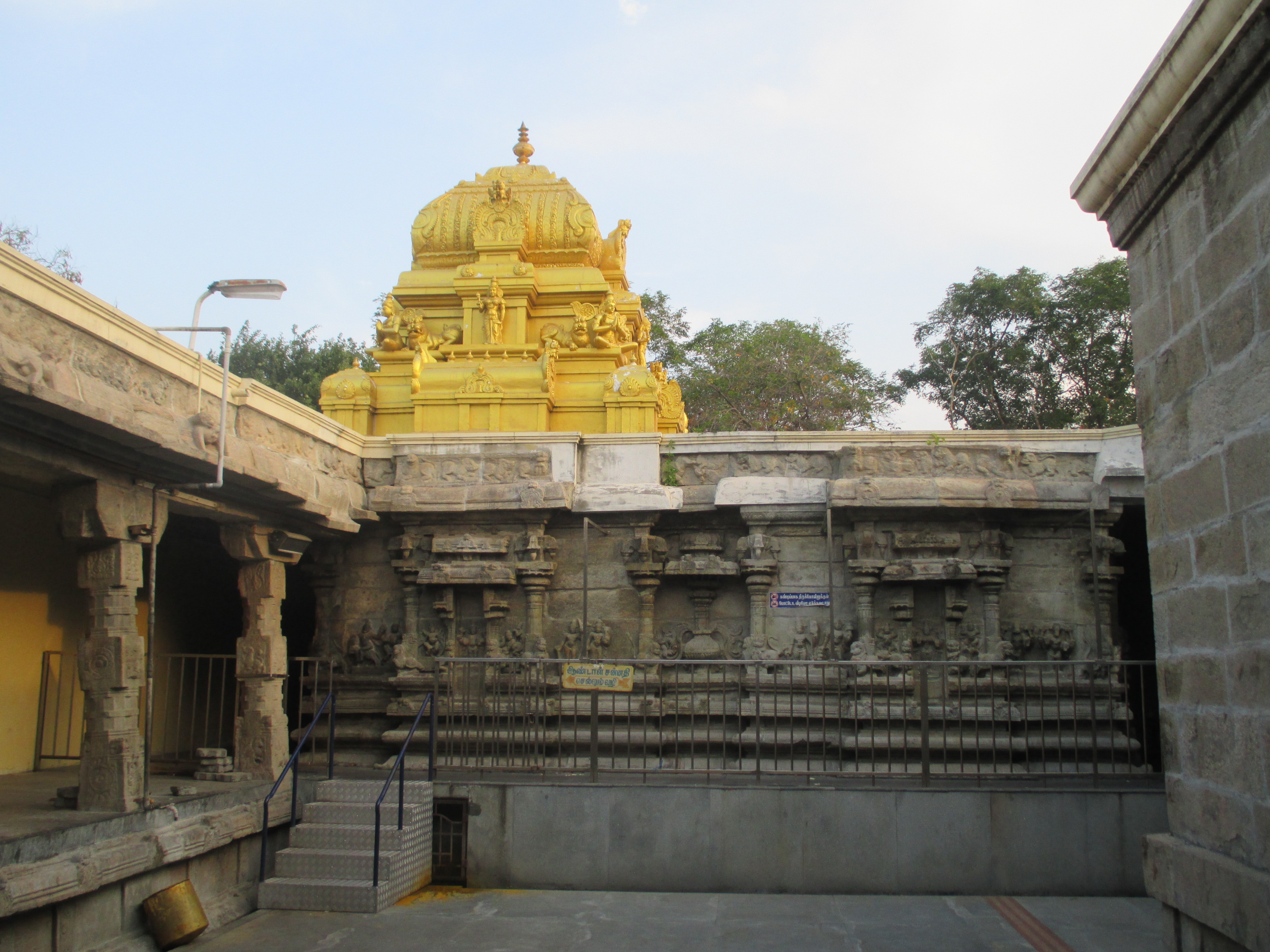
Andal shrine in the temple

The temple is believed to have been built during the rule of Achyuta Deva Raya (1529–1542 CE), the younger brother of Krishna Deva Raya, during the 16th century. The construction supposedly began during the rule of his predecessor, Aliya Rama Raya (1485 – 1565 CE). The outer halls and the sculptures were included during the period of Thirumalai Nayak (1623–59) in 1629. It is also learnt that a chieftain by name Sundaresan appointed the priests of the temple. It is also believed that a hall being named Sundarapandya, the temple might have existed from the earlier Pandyan era and might have been expanded by the Vijayanagara kings.

== Architecture ==
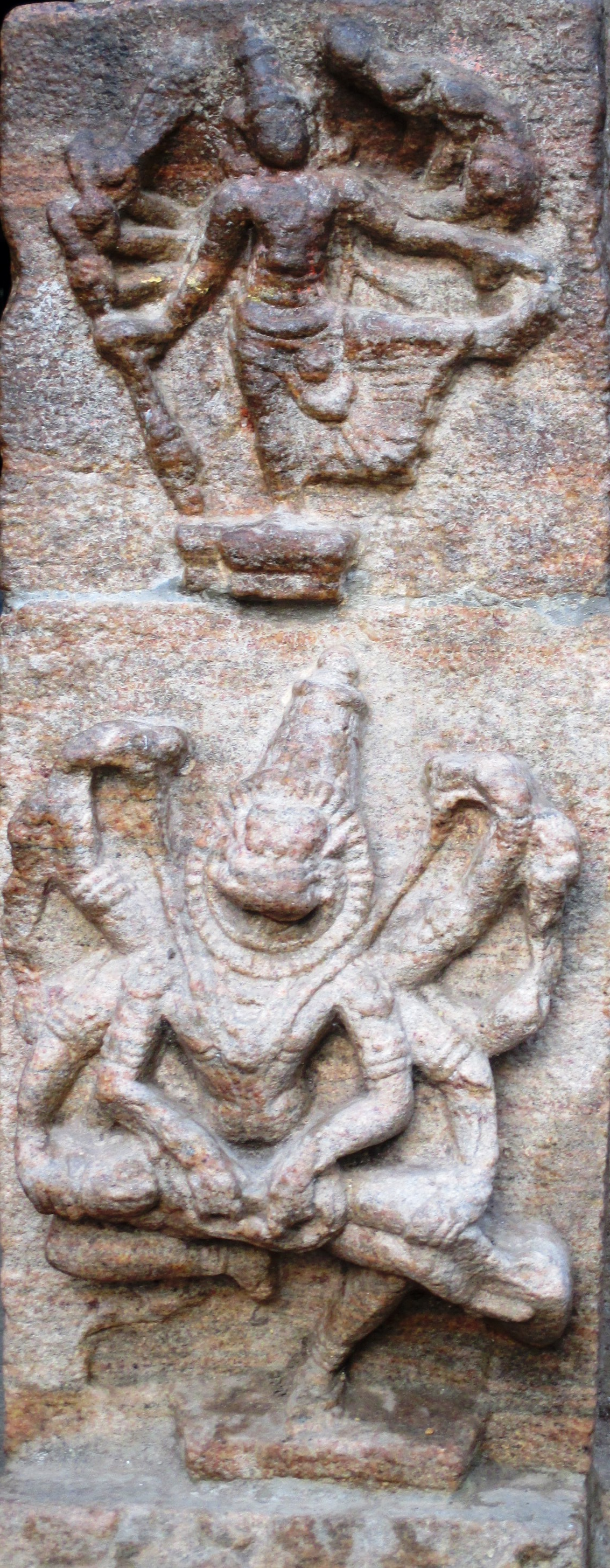
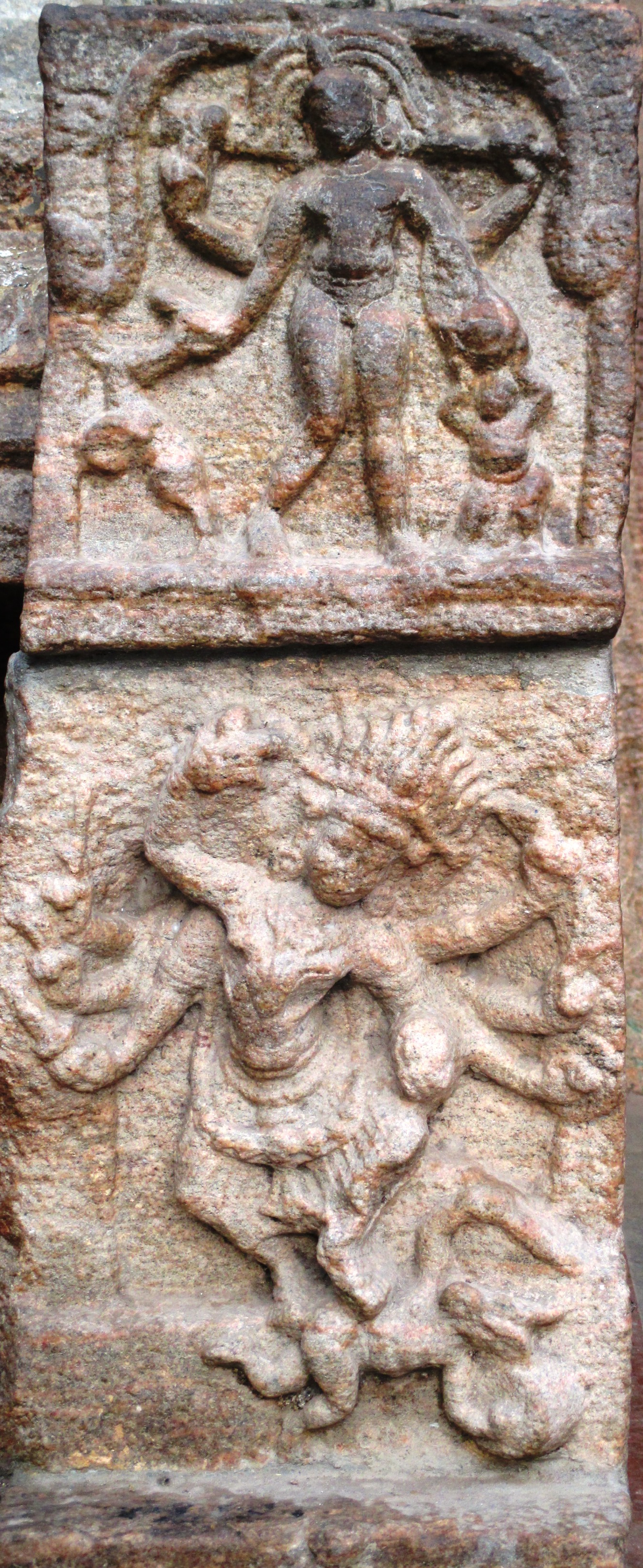
Images of the sculptures in the temple tower basement

The temple is located in Thadikombu, a village in the outskirts of Dindigul in the South Indian state of Tamil Nadu. The temple occupies an area of 1.5 acres (0.61 ha) and is surrounded by rectangular granite walls on all four sides, with a 90 ft (27 m) tall rajagopuram (temple tower). All four sides around the temple are paved in such a way to accommodate movement of the temple car during festive occasions. The main entrance of the temple faces the East, and at the entrance of the temple there is a four pillared open hall. The temple has two precincts. The temple is a madakovil, with its plithe constructed in an elevated platform around 2 m (6.6 ft) in height. The parapets in the steps are decorated with curled yalis, the lion-faced Vijayanagara sculptures.

The first precinct also has shrines for his consort, Soundaravalli, Andal, and Vishvaksenar. All the inner shrines face East, leaving the shrine of Vishvaksenar, which faces the south. The dvajasthambam (flag staff) and a hall are located in axial alignment from the gateway tower to the sanctum. The South-west corner of the second precinct houses the image of Chakratalvar. The images of the Dashavatara, the ten avatars of Vishnu, are housed in the Anna Mandapa.

The presiding deity is housed in the sanctum in standing posture and has a height of 5 ft (1.5 m). Bhudevi and Sridevi are positioned on either side of him. The image of the festive deity is also housed in the sanctum. The Kalyan Mandapa has musical pillars, each of which produce different musical sounds. The same are found in Meenakshi Amman temple, Thanumalayan temple, Kasi Viswanathar temple, Tenkasi, Krishnapuram Venkatachalapathy temple and Alvar Tirunagari temple. The image of standing Ganesha holding an elephant-goad in his hands, Vishnu Durga, and the Anjaneya occupying pillars are noteworthy. The fourteen life size images of the Sundarapandiya Mandapa are Vaikunthanatha, Stunanarasimha, Mahavishnu, Chakratalvar, Madanagopala, Manmathan and Rati, Trivikrama, Nataraja and Kali, Aghora Virabhadra, Rama and Kartavirya Arjuna.

The Ranga Mandapam (also called Anna Mandapam) has beautiful architectural representations of various forms of Vishnu. It is located near the Soundaravalli shrine leading to the sanctum. It is believed that similar architectural specimens of the Vijayanagara kingdom is found in Alagar Koyil, Krishnapuram Venkatachalapathy temple, Srivilliputhur Divya Desam and Jalakandeswarar Temple, Vellore. The composite columns of Virabhadra holding sword and horn are found be additions of the Vijayanayagara kings during the early 1500s. Similar columns of Virabhadra are found in Adikesava Perumal Temple at Thiruvattaru, Meenakshi Temple at Madurai, Nellaiappar Temple at Tirunelveli, Kasi Viswanathar temple at Tenkasi, Krishnapuram Venkatachalapathy temple, Ramanathaswamy Temple at Rameswaram, Srivilliputhur Andal temple, Srivaikuntanathan Permual temple at Srivaikuntam, Avudayarkovil, Vaishnava Nambi and Thirukurungudivalli Nachiar temple at Thirukkurungudi.
