= Thadikombu =

Thadicombu
- Village
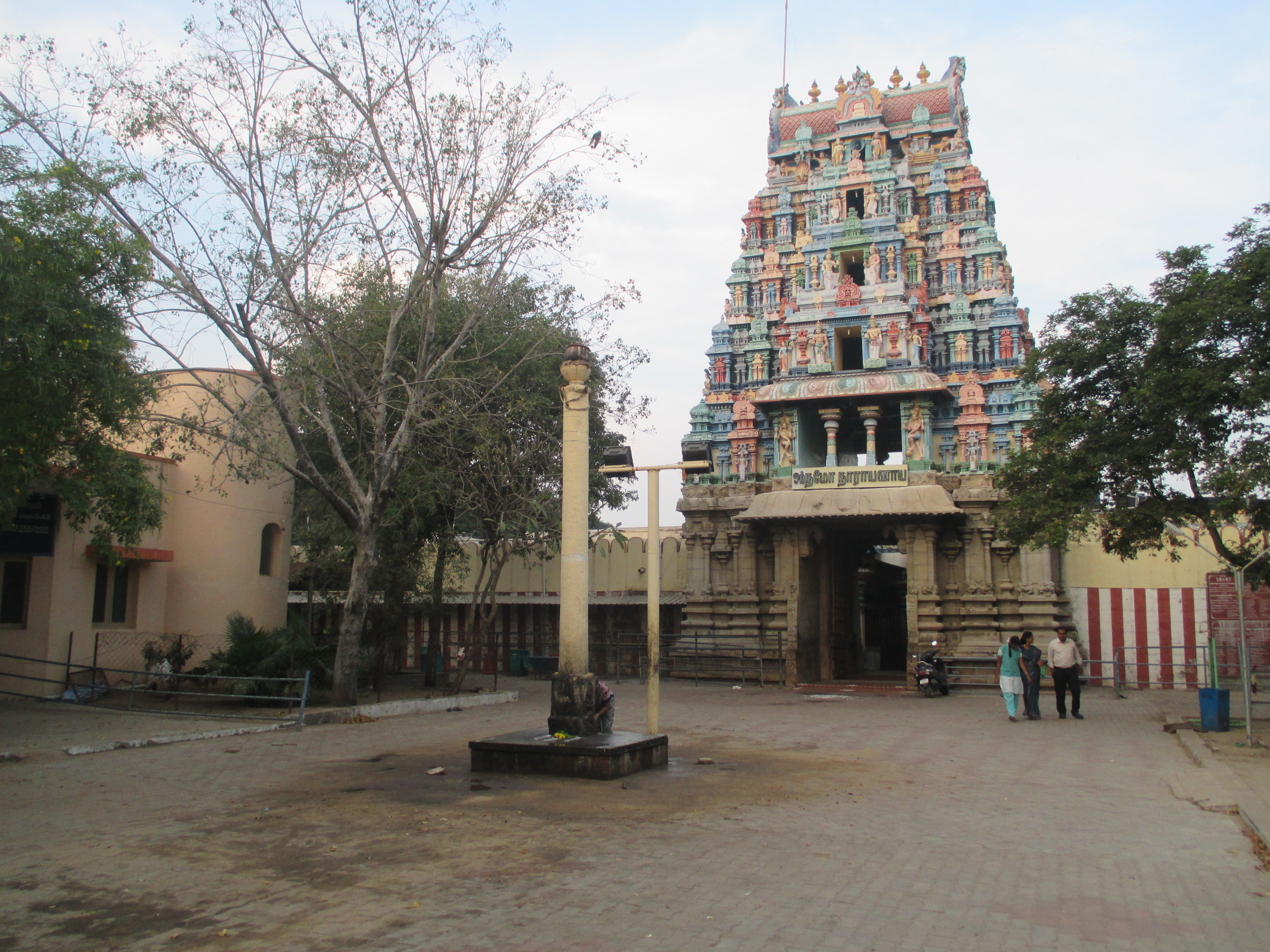
- Image of Soundararajaperumal Temple, Thadikombu, the most famous landmark of Thadikombu

- Location in Tamil Nadu, India
- Coordinates: 10°27′59″N 77°59′23″E
- Country: India
- State: Tamil Nadu
- District: Dindigul

Population (2001)
  - Total: 16,091

Languages
  - Official: Tamil
- Time zone: UTC+5:30 (IST)

Thadicombu is a panchayat town in Dindigul district in the Indian Indian state of Tamil Nadu. It has a temple of Vishnu Soundarraja perumal temple considered to be as sacred as the Kallazhagar Temple near Madurai. Arulmighu Soundarraja Perumal is found in the sleeping posture in this temple and it is said this place was previously known as Thaalamaapuri. Though it is a Vaishnava temple, the sthala vriksha is the vilva tree. The special features of the temple are a separate shrine for the Hindu god of love Manmatha and Rathi. It is also has a shrine for Svarna Akarshana Bhairava which is usually found only in Shiva temples.

== Demographics ==
As of 2001 India census, Thadikombu had a population of 16,091. Males constitute 50% of the population and females 50%. Thadicombu has an average literacy rate of 61%, higher than the national average of 59.5%: male literacy is 70%, and female literacy is 52%. In Thadicombu, 12% of the population is under 6 years of age.
