= Srivilliputhur Andal Temple =

Hindu temple in Tamil Nadu, India

Srivilliputhur Temple
- திருவில்லிபுத்தூர் ஆண்டாள் திருக்கோவில்
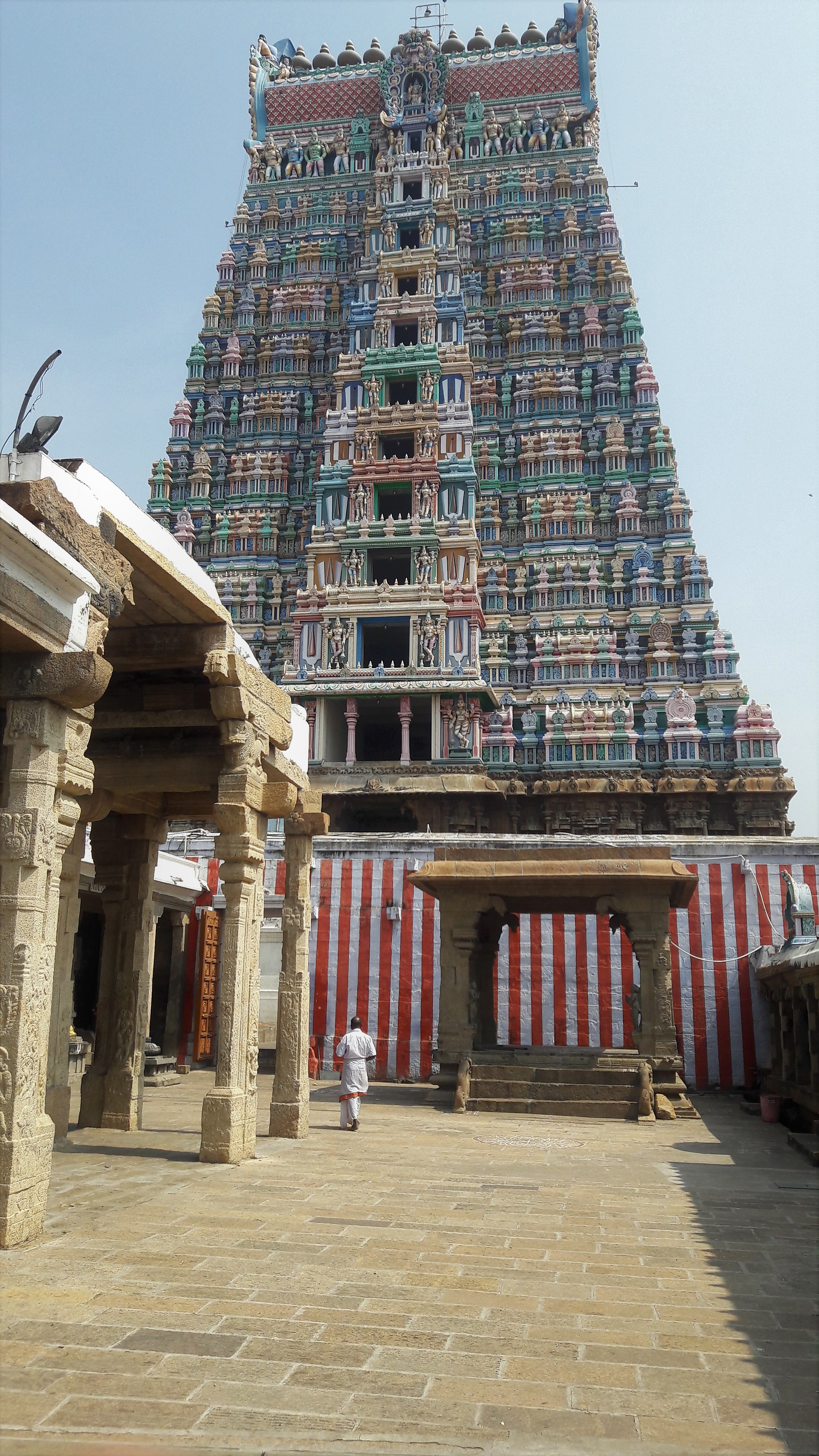

Religion
- Affiliation: Hinduism
- District: Virudhunagar
- Deity: Andal
- Festival: Aani Alvar Uthsavam (June–July) Thiruvadipooram (August) Purattasi Utsavam (October) Ennaikappu (December–January) Panguni Thirukkalyana Utsavam (March–April)

Location
- Location: Srivilliputhur
- State: Tamil Nadu
- Country: India
- Interactive map of Srivilliputhur Temple
- Coordinates: 9°30′29.9″N 77°37′49.4″E

Architecture
- Type: Tamil architecture
- Creator: Chola, Pandya, and Vijayanagara Kings

Specifications
- Temples: 3 (Vatapatrasayi, Andal and Periyalvar)
- Elevation: 177 m (581 ft)

Website
- srivilliputhurandaltemple.tnhrce.in

The Srivilliputhur Andal Temple in Srivilliputhur, a town in Virudhunagar district in the South Indian state of Tamil Nadu, It is one of the 108 Divya Desams dedicated to Vishnu, who is worshipped as Vatapatrasayi and his consort Lakshmi as Andal. It is believed to be the birthplace of two of the Alvars, namely Periyalvar and his foster-daughter, Andal. The temple is located 80 km from Madurai. Constructed in the Tamil Architecture, the temple is glorified in the Nalayira Divya Prabandham, the early medieval Tamil canon of the Alvar saints from the 6th–9th centuries CE.

The temple is associated with the life of Andal, who was found under a tulasi plant in the garden inside the temple by Periyalvar. She worn the garland before dedicating it to the presiding deity of the temple. Periyalvar, who later found it, was highly upset and stopped the practice. Vishnu appeared in his dream and asked him to dedicate the garland worn by Andal to him daily, which is a practice followed during the modern times. Ranganatha of Srirangam Ranganathaswamy temple married Andal, who later merged with him.

The temple has two divisions – the one of Andal located on the Southwest and the second one of Vatapatrasayi on the Northeast direction. A granite wall surrounds the temple, enclosing all its shrines, the garden where Andal is believed to have been born and two of its three bodies of water. The Vijayanagar and Nayak kings commissioned paintings on the walls of the shrine of temple, some of which are still present.

The samprokshanam ritual of the Andal temple was performed on 20 January 2016 by Tamil Nadu Government.

Vatapatrasayi is believed to have appeared to Andal, Periyalvar and sages Markandeya and Bhrigu. The temple follows Thenkalai tradition of worship. Six daily rituals and three yearly festivals are held at the temple, of which the Aadipooram festival, the birthday of Andal, celebrated during the Tamil month of Adi (July - August), is the most prominent.The Rajagopura was built by Vijayanagar Kings during 15th century. The temple is maintained and administered by the Hindu Religious and Charitable Endowments Department of the Government of Tamil Nadu.

== Etymology ==
As per Hindu legend, the land around Srivilliputhur was under the rule of Queen Malli. The queen had two sons called Villi and Kandan. While the two were hunting in a forest, a tiger killed Kandan. Unaware of this, Villi searched for his brother, got tired and fell asleep. In his dream, divinity narrated to him what happened to his brother. By divine orders, Villi founded a city. The city is originally named after its founder, Villi forming the word Sri-Villi-Puthur. Srivilliputtur is known by other names such as Varaha kshetram, Thenpuduvai, Vadeswarapuram, Vadamahadamapuram, Shenbagaranya kshetram, Vikrama chola chaturvedhi mangalam, and Sridhanvipuri.

== Legend ==
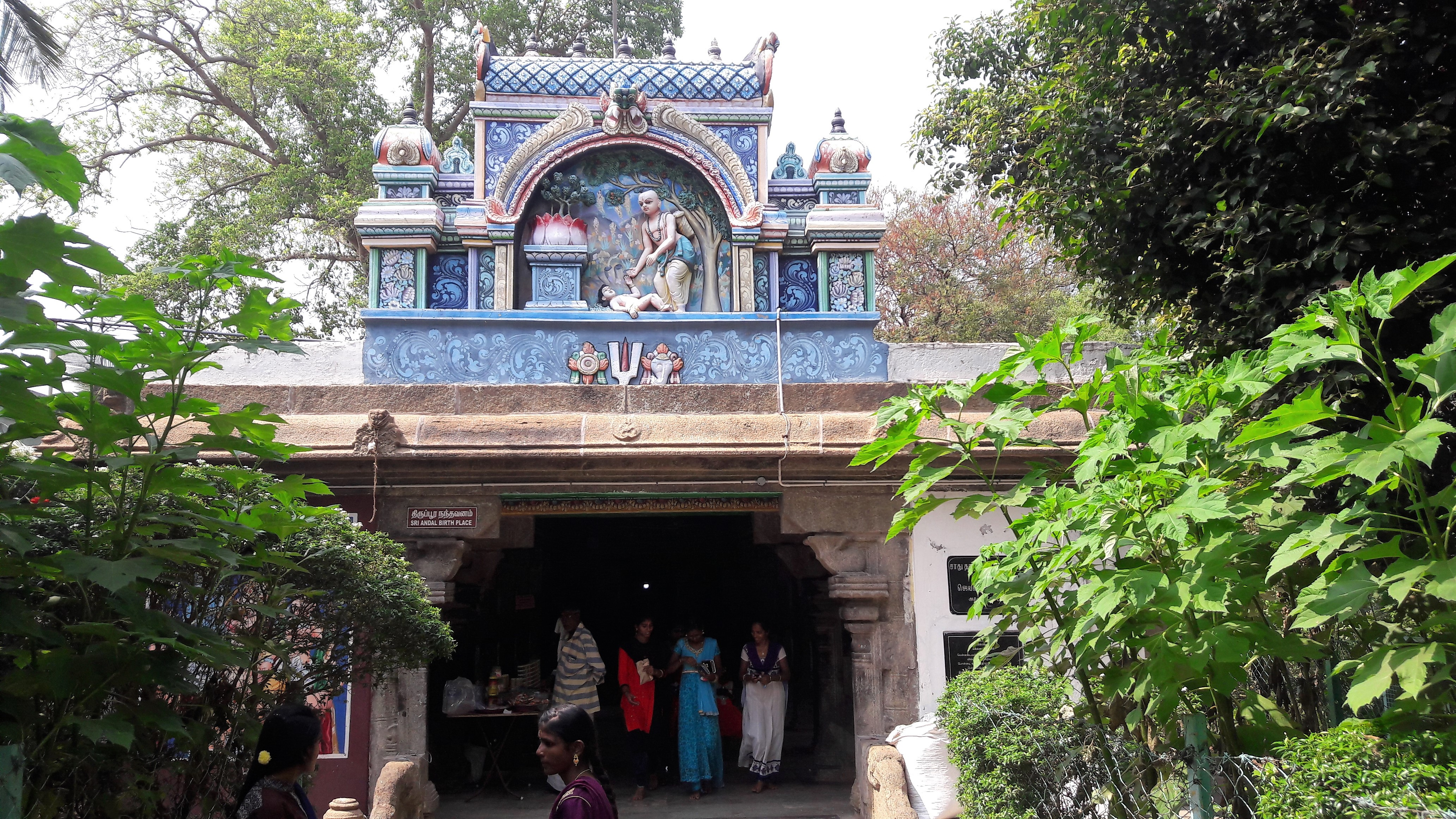
The garden where Periyalvar is believed to have found the child Andal

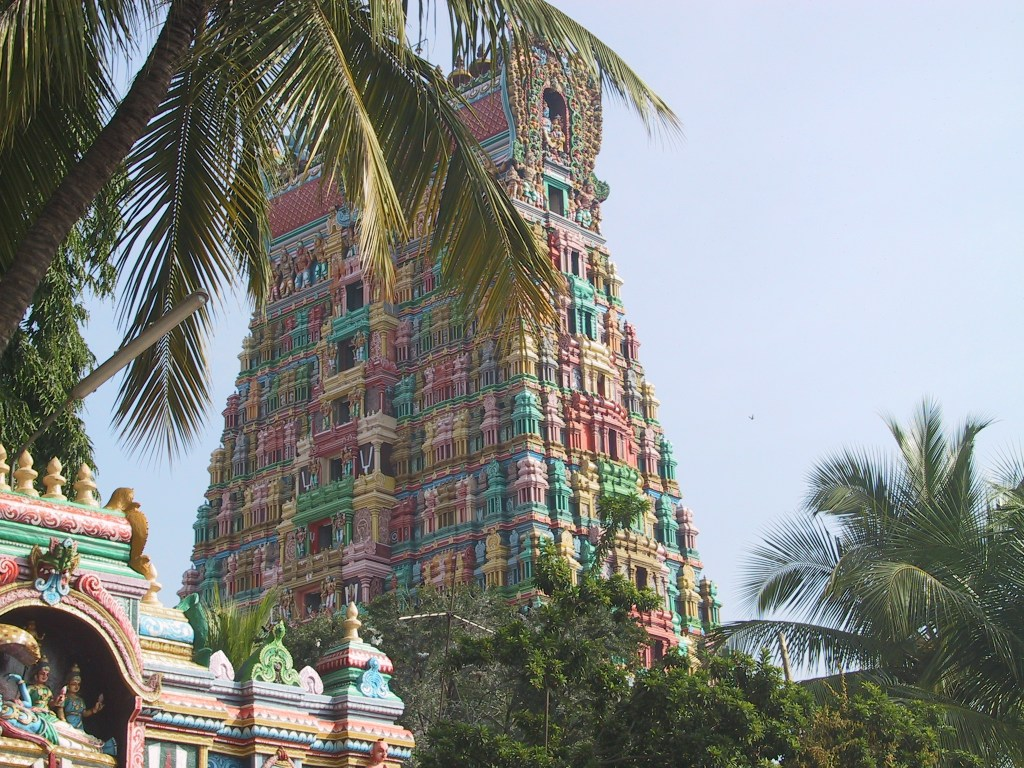
The tower viewed from an angle

As per the ancient scriptures, the place was referred as Varaha Kshetra. It was a dense forest named Champaka where the sages Bhrgu and Markandeya were doing penance and had their hermitages in the place. A demon named Kalanerai was troubling the sages and they prayed to Vishnu to relieve them from the demon. Vishnu was pleased by their devotion and appeared in the place to slay the demon. He is believed to have taken the abode in the forest reclining on Adisesha, his serpent bed, on the leaf of a banyan tree. The place thus came to be known as Vadaveshwarapuram.

Periyalvar (originally called Vishnuchittar) was an ardent devotee of Vishnu and he used to string garland to Vishnu every day. He was childless and he prayed to Vishnu to save him from the longing. One day, he found a girl child under a tulasi plant in a garden inside the temple. He and his wife named the child as Kothai, who grew up as a devotee of Krishna, an avatar of Vishnu. She is believed to have worn the garland before dedicating it to the presiding deity of the temple. Periyalvar, who later found it, was highly upset and remonstrated her. Vishnu appeared in his dream and asked him to dedicate only the garland worn by Andal to him. The girl Kothai was thus named Andal and was referred as Chudikodutha Sudarkodi (lady who gave her garland to Vishnu). The practise is followed during modern times when the garland of Andal is sent to Azhagar Koyil on Chitra Pournami day where the presiding deity Lord Kallazhagar entering into River Vaigai with the garland worn by Goddess Andal and Tirumala Venkateswara Temple during [Garudostavam during the Tamil month of Puratasi (September - October)]. It is also believed that Ranganatha of Srirangam Ranganathaswamy temple married Andal, who later merged with the idol. Andal was taken in a palanquin from Srivilliputhur to Srirangam before the marriage. Since Andal married Ranganatha, who came as a king (called Raja), the presiding deity is called Rangamannar.

== History ==
Tamil Nadu State's Emblem

The history of Srivilliputhur centres around the Srivilliputhur Andal Temple, dedicated to Andal. It is argued that the temple of Vatapatrasayi is present from the 8th century, but there are epigraphic records are available only from the 10th century CE. The view that the Andal temple was built during the 14th century is highly debated. The temple has inscriptions from Chola, Pandya and Vijayanagar Nayakkar Kings, spanning across various centuries from the 10th to 16th centuries. As per some accounts, the original structure was constructed by Tribuvana Chakravarthy Konerinmai Kondan Kulasekaran and the Andal temple and 194 feet Rajagopura was built by Barathi Rayar of Vijayanagar king.

During the reign of Thirumalai Nayak (1623–1659) and Rani Mangammal (1689–1706), this city became very popular. Thirumalai Nayak renovated all the temples of this city. He installed choultaries, temple tanks, paintings and golden towers inside the temple. The sculptures in the hall leading to the shrine of Andal were also built by him. From 1751 to 1756 CE, Srivilliputhur came under the rule of Nerkattumseval palayakkarar and was a maravarpalayam. Then it fell into the hands of Mohammed Yousoof Khan. Until 1850, Sri Andal temple was under the care of the king of Trivancore. The British ruled the country till India attained freedom in 1947. The temple's gateway tower, 192 ft (59 m) tall and it is believed that this is the official symbol of the Government of Tamil Nadu (Sri Vatapatrasayi Temple Tower). But the artist who designed the emblem for the state of Tamil Nadu Thiru.Krishna Rao denied that it is not the temple of Srivilliputhur rather it is Meenakshi Temple's West Gopuram. During the modern times, the temple is maintained and administered by the Hindu Religious and Charitable Endowments Department of the Government of Tamil Nadu.

== Architecture ==
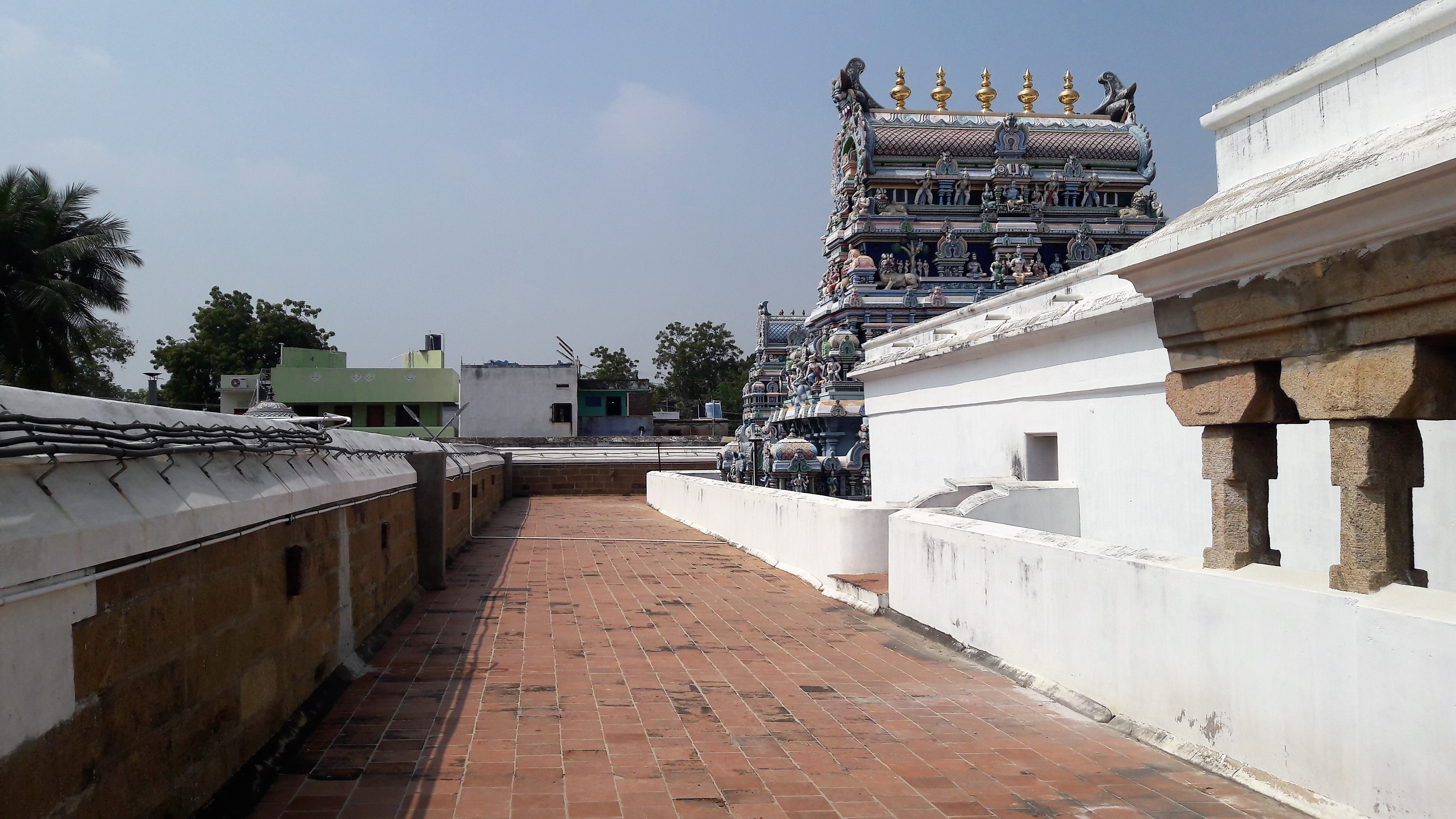
The vimana (ceiling) of Vadapathrasayee shrine

The temple has two divisions – the one of Andal located on the Southwest and the second one is Vatapatrasayi (Vishnu) on the Northeast direction. A granite wall surrounds the temple, enclosing all its shrines, the garden where Andal was found and two of its three bodies of water. The rajagopuram, the temple's gateway tower, 192 ft (59 m) tall. The tower is originally believed to have been built by Periyalvar with the prize money he obtained from religious debates in the court of Vallaba Pandya in Madurai.

The Andal shrine houses the image of Andal and Rangamannar. Garuda, who brought Ranganathar, the divine bridegroom, from Srirangam is also housed in the same shrine. The walls around the shrine has paintings of the life of Andal. The second hall from the entrance towards the sanctum, the Kalyana Mandapa, houses huge life-size sculptures of Mohini, Rama, Kamadeva, Rati, and many other deities.

The Vatapatrasayi division has two precincts. The sanctum in the second level approached through a flight of steps houses the image of Vatapatrasayi in a reclining posture and his consorts, Sridevi and Bhudevi, are shown attending to him at his feet. Sage Bhrigu stands near his head and sage Markandeya is near his feet. The banyan tree whose leaf is known as Vatapatram, on which Vishnu is said to rest in the form of a baby during deluge, is at his head, behind Bhrigu. Images of Panchamurtis - Tumburu, Narada, the Sanatkumaras, Kinnara Mithuna, the sun and the moon gods are shown all around Rangamannar as well as representations of Villi and Puttan are seen at his feet. The sanctum has three doorways from which the presiding deity can be seen. The hall leading to the sanctum, Bhopala villam, has a hall with detailed teak wood carvings depicting incidents from the Puranas and the ten avatars of Vishnu, the Dashavatara. There are a set of carvings that decorate the ceiling.

The temple houses some rare Vijayanagara sculptures similar to the ones present in Soundararajaperumal Temple, Thadikombu, Krishnapuram Venkatachalapathy temple, Alagar Koyil and Jalakandeswarar Temple, Vellore. The composite columns of Virabhadra holding sword and horn are found be additions of the Vijayanayagara kings during the early 1500s. Similar columns of Virabhadra are found in Adikesava Perumal Temple at Thiruvattaru, Meenakshi Temple at Madurai, Nellaiappar Temple at Tirunelveli, Kasi Viswanathar temple at Tenkasi, Krishnapuram Venkatachalapathy temple, Ramanathaswamy Temple at Rameswaram, Soundararajaperumal temple at Thadikombu, Srivaikuntanathan Permual temple at Srivaikuntam, Avudayarkovil, Vaishnava Nambi and Thirukurungudivalli Nachiar temple at Thirukkurungudi.

== Religious significance ==
Srivilliputtur finds mention in Brahmakaivatsapuranam and Varaha puranam. Varaha puranam foretells the existence of Srivilliputtur and the consequent visit of Vishnu in his Varaha form. Brahmakaivatsa puranam mentions the location of Vatapatrasayi Temple in Srivilliputtur.

Srivilliputhur has a significant place in Vaishnava philosophy and worship practices. The Srivilliputtur Divya Desam has the unique distinction among all other Divya Desams of being the birthplace of two important Alvars among the twelve Alvars, Periyalvar, who became the father-in-law of the Ranganatha himself and Andal who was the incarnation of Bhudevi and attained union with the Ranganathan at Srirangam. Andal is the only female Alvar saint of the 12 Alvar saints of South India. She is credited with the Tamil works of Thirupavai and Nachiar Tirumoli that are still recited by devotees during the Winter festival season of Margali. The town wakes up to the sounds of Thiruppavai is believed to lead to a sublime atmosphere throughout the day.

Andal is known for her unwavering devotion to god Vishnu, the supreme deity of the Sri Vaishnavas. Adopted by her father, Periyalvar, Andal avoided earthly marriage, the normal and expected path for women of her culture, to marry Vishnu. In many places in India, particularly in Tamil Nadu, Andal is treated more than a saint and as a form of god herself and a shrine for Andal is dedicated in most Vishnu temples.

== Festivals and religious practises ==
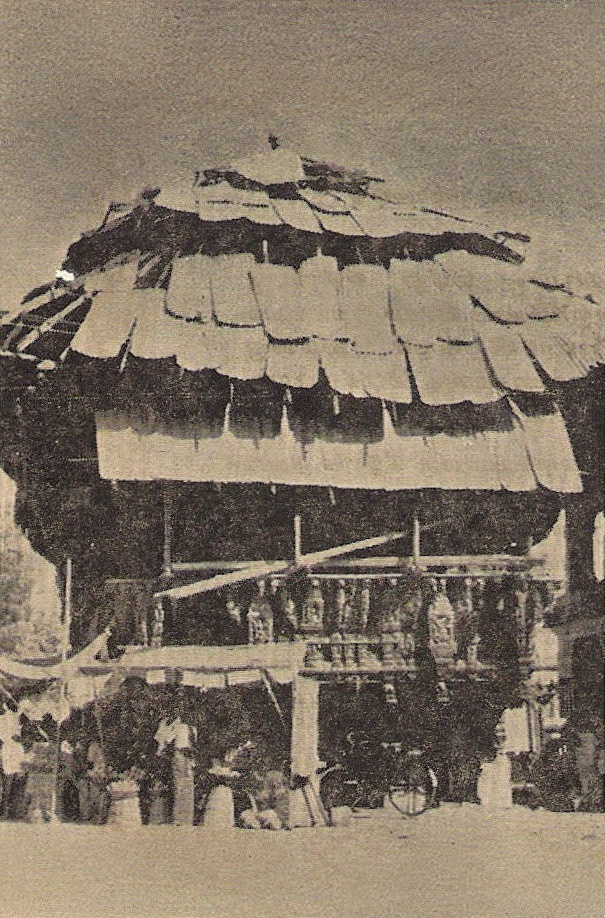
Andal temple car in 1960 (kept idle for 18 years)

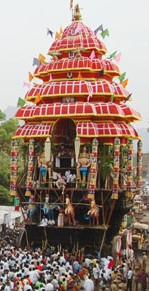
Andal temple car

The temple follows Thenkalai tradition of worship. The temple priests perform the pooja (rituals) during festivals and on a daily basis. Like other Vishnu temples of Tamil Nadu, the priests belong to the Vaishnava community, from the Brahmin class. The temple rituals are performed six times a day: Ushathkalam at 7 a.m., Kalasanthi at 8:00 a.m., Uchikalam at 12:00 p.m., Sayarakshai at 6:00 p.m., Irandamkalam at 7:00 p.m. and Ardha Jamam at 10:00 p.m. Each ritual has three steps: alangaram (decoration), neivethanam (food offering) and deepa aradanai (waving of lamps) for both Vatapatrasayi and Andal. During the last step of worship, nadasvaram (pipe instrument) and tavil (percussion instrument) are played, religious instructions in the Vedas (sacred text) are recited by priests, and worshippers prostrate themselves in front of the temple mast. There are weekly, monthly and fortnightly rituals performed in the temple.

Thousands of people from the state participate in the "Aadi Pooram" festival celebrated in the Andal Temple. After early morning special pujas, the presiding deities, Sri Rengamannar and Goddess Andal are taken in decorated palanquins to the car. The festival marks the adoption of presiding deity, Andal, by Periyalvar after he found her near a tulasi plant in the garden of Vatapatrasayi Temple at Srivilliputhur on the eighth day of the Tamil month of Adi. The temple car was originally very heavy (40 m tall and 650 tonnes) and it took days to take it back to the original position. Before 2000, the practise of drawing the temple car during the yearly festival was suspended. With the efforts of Vanamamalai Jeer, the head of a monastic institution, the temple car was modified with hydraulic wheels to ease the movement. Kumbabishekam, the consecration of the Andal temple happened on 20 January 2016. Golden filials were also installed for Andal temple. Fridays and Saturdays are considered the ideal time to visit the temple.

== See also ==
- List of tallest structures built before the 20th century
