= Bhumi (goddess) =

Hindu goddess of the earth

- Goddess of the Earth
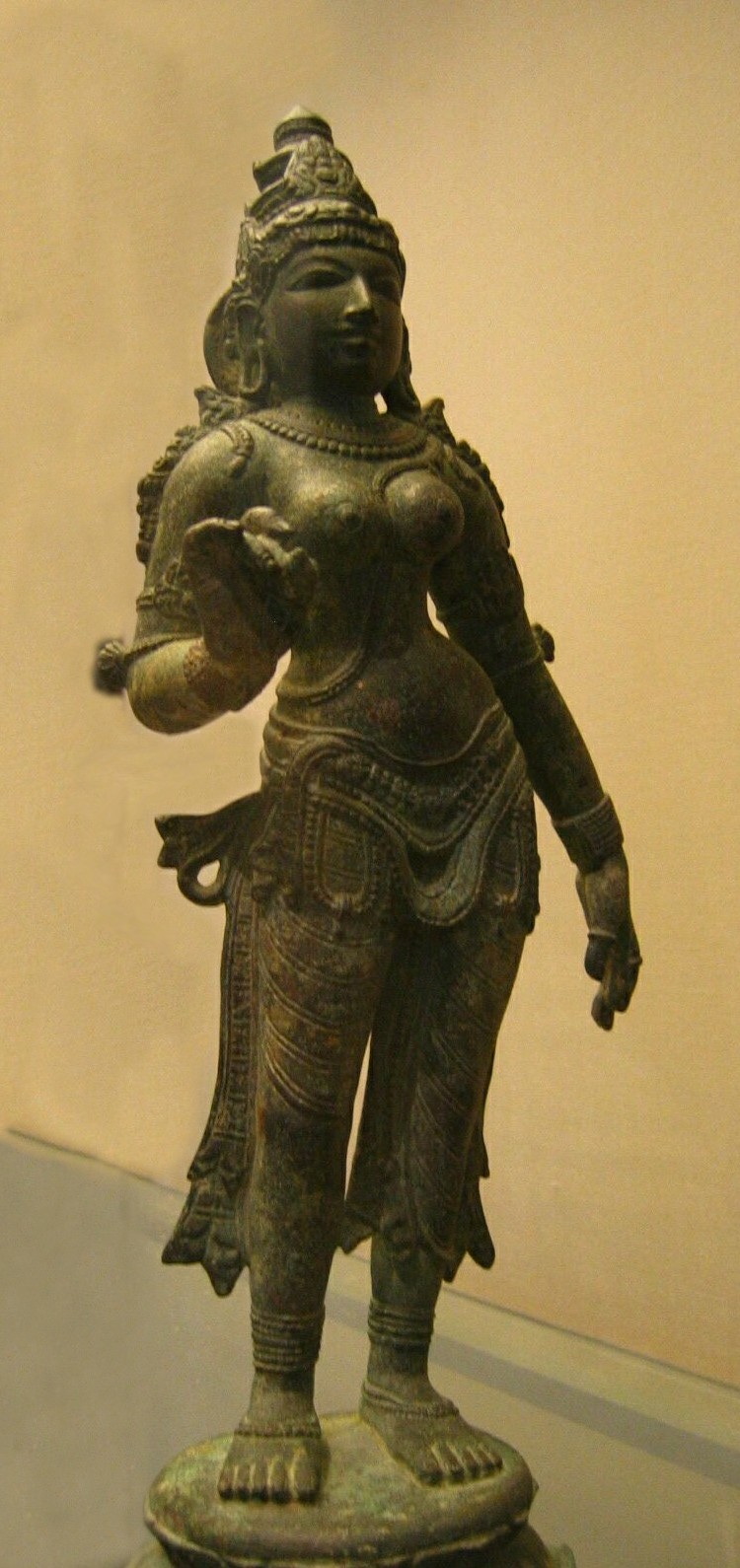
- Bronze sculpture of Bhudevi (Bhumi)
- Other names: Bhudevi; Varahi; Vasundhara; Prithvi; Vishvambhari; Dharani; Bhuvana; Bhuvaneshwari
- Affiliation: Devi; Satyabhama; Lakshmi; Andal
- Abode: Bhuloka; Vaikuntha
- Mantra: oṃ vasundharāyai vidmahe bhūtadhātryai dhīmahi tanno bhūmiḥ pracodayāt
- Mount: Elephant
- Festivals: Raja Parba

Genealogy
- Consort: Vishnu as Varaha
- Children: Narakasura; Mangala; Sita

Equivalents
- Chinese: Houtu

Bhumi (Sanskrit: भूमि, romanized: Bhūmi), also known as Bhudevi, Dharani, Bhuvi, Dhare, Bhuvaneshwari, Avani and Vasundhara, is the goddess of the Earth in Hinduism. In the early Vedic period, the earth is personified by the goddess Prithvi, whom Bhumi later supplanted in the post-Vedic period. Nevertheless, Prithvi remains a prominent epithet for Bhumi, though their roles, attributes and depictions are drastically different. Bhumi features prominently in the texts such as the Mahabharata, the Ramayana and various Puranas.

Bhumi plays a central role in Hindu mythology, where she is often portrayed as a supplicant, oppressed by evil forces, demons or corrupt rulers. These stories frequently depict her appealing to the god Vishnu for assistance, and in response, Vishnu intervenes to alleviate her distress by taking different avatars. In one instance, Vishnu takes the Varaha (boar) avatar to rescue her from the asura Hiranyaksha. In another narrative, Vishnu takes the avatar of King Prithu to tame Bhumi, who had run away in the form of a cow, and milks her to obtain resources benefiting all creatures. Bhumi is mentioned as the mother of Mangala (Mars), as well as the evil asura, Naraka. She incarnates as Satyabhama, the queen of Vishnu's avatar Krishna, to help defeat Naraka. Sita, the female protagonist of Ramayana, is also regarded as Bhumi's daughter.

Bhumi is revered in Vaishnava sects, especially in South India, where she is regarded as Vishnu's secondary consort alongside Lakshmi. Some traditions, such as Sri Vaishnavism, view her as an aspect of Lakshmi. Iconographically, Bhumi is depicted holding a pomegranate and a blue lotus, and is often shown alongside Vishnu-Lakshmi or with Varaha. She is also depicted in the form of a cow.

== Etymology ==
The name "Bhūmi" is the Sanskrit word for "earth". The version "Puhumi" is the equivalent in Old Awadhi.

She is known by various names such as Bhuvati, Bhuvani, Bhuvaneshwari, Avni, Prithvi, Dharti, Dhaatri, Dharani, Vasudha, Vasundhara, Vaishnavi, Kashyapi, Urvi, Ira, Mahi, Ela, Vasumati, Dhanshika, Vasumati, Hema, and Hiranmaya.

== Iconography ==
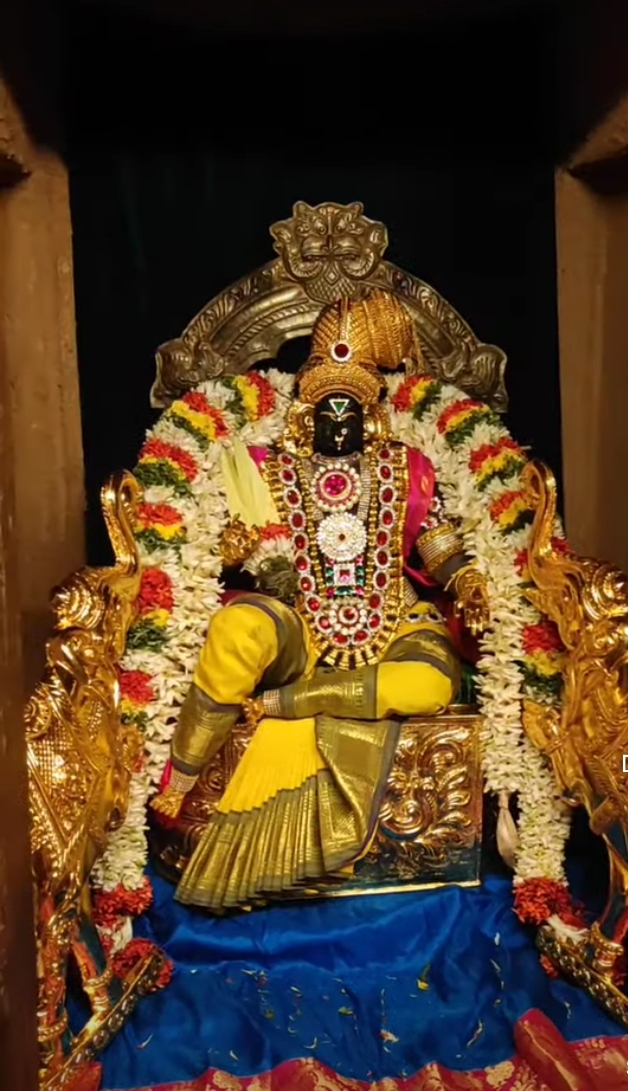
Idol (murti) of Bhumi at a temple in Tamil Nadu

Bhudevi is depicted as seated on a platform that rests on the back of four elephants, representing the four cardinal directions. She is usually portrayed with four arms, holding a pomegranate, a water vessel, a bowl containing healing herbs, and another bowl containing vegetables, respectively. She is also sometimes depicted with two hands, the right hand holding a blue lotus known as Kumuda or Utpala, the night lotus, while the left hand may indicate the pose of Abhayamudra, the fearlessness or the Lolahasta Mudra, which is an aesthetic pose meant to mimic the tail of a horse.

== Mythology ==
=== Birth ===
Varying accounts of Bhumi's birth are narrated in Hindu scriptures. The southern recension of the epic Mahabharata mentions Bhumi as the daughter of the creator god Brahma. The Devi Bhagavata Purana states her to be born of out the remains of two rakshasas, Madhu and Kaitabha.

=== Rescue by Varaha ===
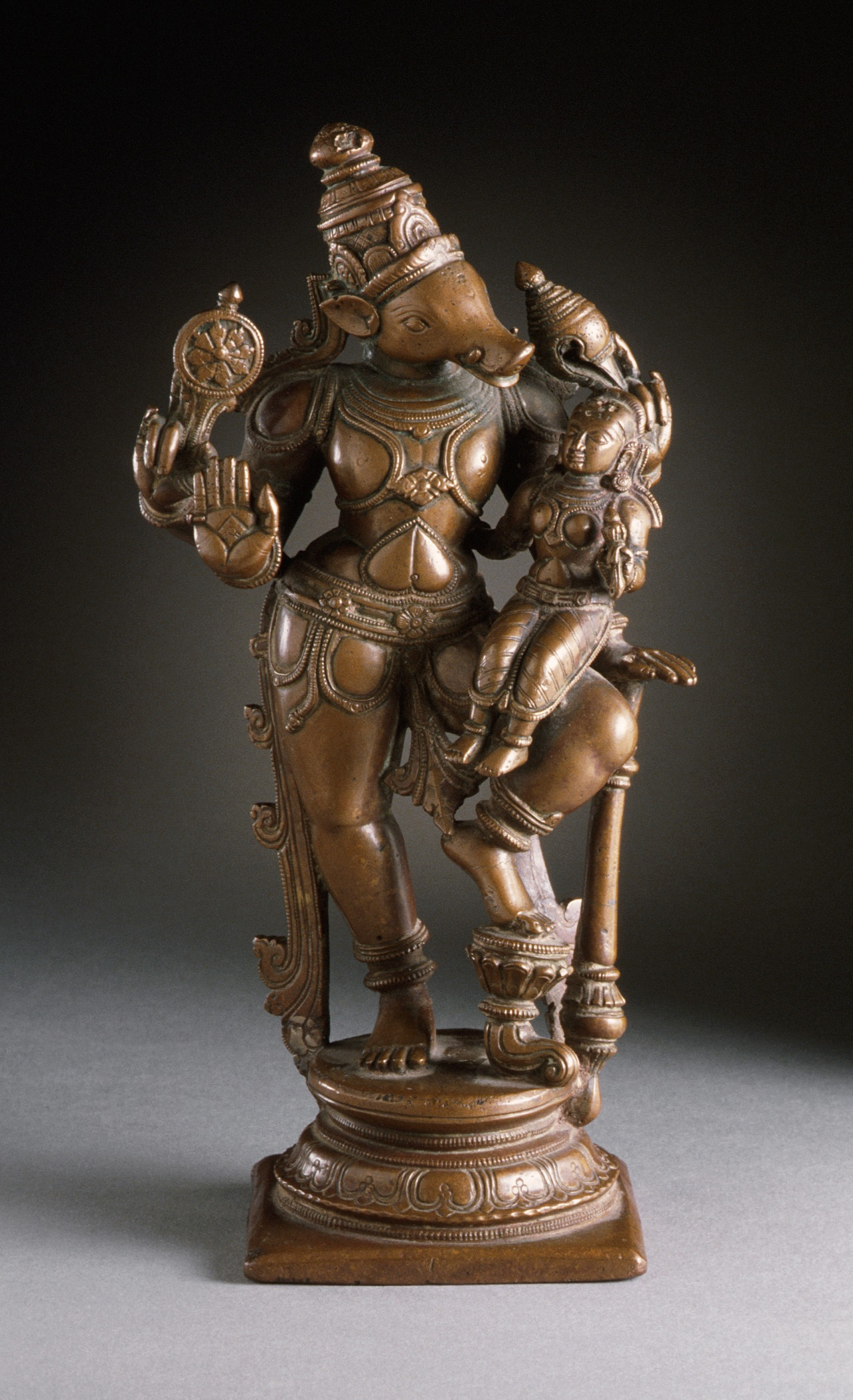
A sculpture of Bhumi seated on Varaha's lap.

Bhumi is the consort of the anthropomorphic Varaha, an avatar of the preserver god Vishnu. According to the Puranas, during the Satya Yuga (first eon), the demon Hiranyaksha kidnapped Bhumi and hid her in the primordial waters. Upon the request of the gods, Vishnu took the avatar (incarnation) of Varaha to rescue her. Varaha slew the demon and retrieved the Earth from the depths of the ocean, lifting it on his tusks. He restored Bhumi to her rightful place in the universe, and proceeded to marry her.

The episode of the devas seeking the assistance of Vishnu's Varaha avatar in rescuing Bhumi is described in the Padma Purana:

They sought the shelter of Nārāyaṇa, Viṣṇu. Then knowing that wonder, he, Viṣṇu, the holder of a conch, a disc, and a mace, took up the Boar-form, existing everywhere and having no beginning, middle or end. The highest lord full of everything, having hands and feet on all sides, having large fangs and arms, struck the demon with one fang. The mean son of Diti, with his huge body pounded, died. Seeing the earth fallen (from the demon's head), he lifted it with his fang, and putting it on Śeṣa's head as before, took up the form of a Tortoise. Seeing great Viṣṇu of the form of the hog, all deities and sages, with their bodies bowed with devotion, praised him.

— Padma Purana, Chapter 237

=== Children ===
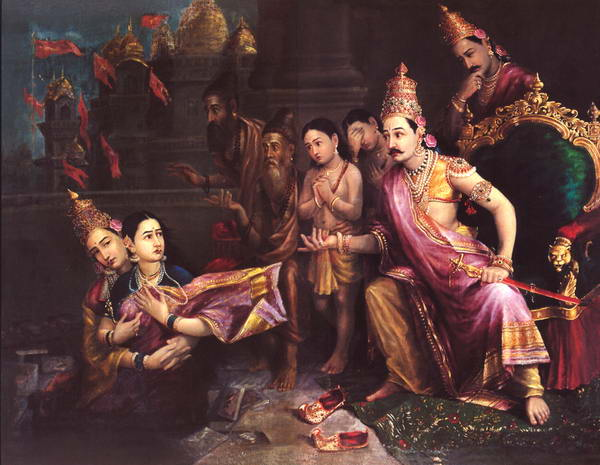
Sita returns to her mother, the Earth, (left) as Rama, her sons, and the sages watch in astonishment, painting by Raja Ravi Varma

Narakasura was the first born of Bhumi. There are two stories about Narakasura's birth. In the first one, he was the first son of Bhumi and Varaha. He was born when Bhumi requested Varaha for a son. Narakasura later performed a penance to receive a boon that only his mother would be able to kill him. In the second one, Narakasura's father was Hiranyaksha and was born when Hiranyaksha's horns touched Bhumi.

Mangala, according to Vaishnava tradition, was the son of Varaha and Bhumi.

Sita, the wife of Rama, emerged from the earth, and subsequently adopted by the King of Mithila, Janaka. The tale goes that there was once a drought in Mithila, the hometown of Sita. Janaka, the future father of Sita, was ploughing the ground. Under his plough, he found a baby girl (Sita). Rain showered upon the earth and Janaka and his wife decided to adopt the girl. As Sita was born from the earth, she was also known as Bhumija.

=== Saving Prahlada ===
Prahlada, the son of Hiranyakashipu, was a devotee of Vishnu. The father did not like the son's devotion to Vishnu. He punished Prahlada in a number of ways. Once, he threw down Prahlada from the top of a high building. At that moment, Bhumi appeared there and received him in her arms.

=== The milking of the earth ===
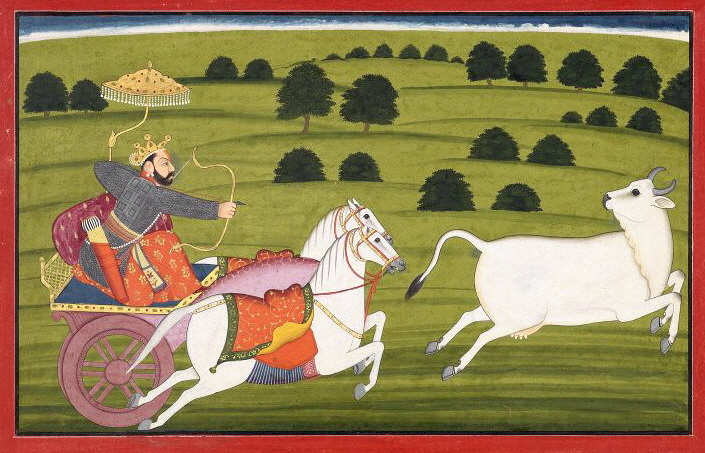
Prithu chasing the earth goddess Bhumi, who is in the form of a cow. From an illustrated manuscript of the Bhagavata Purana. Indian, Pahari, c 1740

One of the most well-recounted legends of Bhumi is her episode with the emperor of the world, Prithu. When Prithu hears that his people are starving because the earth had withdrawn most of her vegetation, he furiously chases her in her form of a cow. She submits, allowing herself to be milked so that living beings could be nourished once more. Attributes such as the courage, valour, knowledge, and the bodily health of the Brahmin sages are stated to have been milked from the earth, and the virtues and the truths that characterise animals may be attributed to her as well:

Pṛthu got angry on hearing this and taking his bow Ajagava and several arrows went in search of the goddess of earth. The goddess got frightened and fled taking the form of a cow. She went to all lokas but Pṛthu followed her with his bow and arrows everywhere. At last desiring to escape from the arrows of such a valiant king Bhūmidevī went to him and trembling with fear said "Oh king, why do you make such a persistent attempt, to kill me which would be the great sin of Strīvadha? (killing a woman)." The Rājā replied that there was no sin in killing wicked persons. The goddess asked what refuge was there for the people if the earth was destroyed. The king said that he would protect his people by the power of his yoga. Bhūmidevī was frightened and she said "Oh king, I shall give you back all I have destroyed in the form of milk. Therefore, virtuous as you are, if you are really interested in the welfare of the people I shall allow you to milk me and take back everything you want. Do bring a calf."

=== Satyabhama avatar ===
The scriptures narrate how Bhumi took incarnation as a human to slay her son, Narakasura. According to the legend, after receiving his desired boon, Narakasura grew arrogant and drunk with his power. He started capturing women and forcefully made them his wives. He captured nearly 16,000 women. He wrested control of heaven from Indra and no deity was able to defeat him because of his boon. Narakasura even took the earrings of Indra's mother, Aditi, and gave them to his mother, Bhumi. Bhumi was requested by the devas to slay her son. She manifested herself upon the earth as Satyabhama, the daughter of Satrajit. Satyabhama married Krishna, and the couple waged war on Narakasura. She finally beheaded the latter with her husband's Sudarshana Chakra, thus fulfilling the prophecy that the asura could only be killed by his mother.

=== Andal avatar ===
Andal, the only female Alvar saint of South India, is considered an avatar of Bhumi Devi. She is believed to be active in the 8th-century CE. Andal was raised by Periyalvar in Srivilliputhur, where she grew up as an ardent devotee of Krishna. According to literary and religious tradition, Periyalvar was an ardent devotee of Vishnu and he used to string garlands to Vishnu every day. He was childless and one day, he found a girl under a Tulasi plant in the garden inside Sri Andal Rangamannar Temple, Srivilliputhur. This child was believed to be a manifestation of Bhu Devi herself. He named the child as Gothai, who grew up as a devotee of Krishna. She is believed to have worn the garland before dedicating it to the presiding deity of the temple. The girl Kothai was thus named Andal and was referred to as "Chudikodutha Sudarkodi", meaning the lady who wore and gave her garland to Vishnu. Periyalvar took Andal to the Ranganathaswamy Temple in Srirangam where she was reunited with Vishnu as his bride.

Andal was brought up by Periyalvar in an atmosphere of love and devotion. As she grew into a beautiful maiden, her fervor for God grew to the extent that she decided to marry only God himself. It was at Srirangam where Vishnu as Ranganatha married Bhu Devi as Andal. Andal is credited with two great Tamil works, Tiruppavai and Nachiyar Tirumoli, which are still recited by devotees during the winter festival season of Margali.

== Festival ==
The Raja festival in Odisha, Eastern India, is a three-day celebration dedicated to Bhudevi, also known as Bhoomi Devi. This festival honors the essence of womanhood and agriculture in life. During Raja, Bhudevi is revered as a symbol of motherhood, femininity, and fertility. The festival marks the beginning of the monsoon and the arrival of new crops, as it is believed that Bhudevi is resting and preparing to bless humanity with a prosperous harvest. Raja is predominantly celebrated by women and young girls. They indulge in self-care, donning new clothes and beautiful ornaments. Applying red dye (alta) to their feet and adorning their hair with flowers are essential rituals. They are treated to their favorite food and a special Odia delicacy called Poda Pitha, a baked rice cake prepared exclusively for this occasion. Elaborate flower-laced swings are set up for the women and girls, who are considered embodiments of goddesses, particularly Bhudevi. They are not allowed to touch the ground during the festival. To respect Bhudevi's deep slumber, people refrain from digging the earth or engaging in agricultural work during this time. The festival embodies the interdependence and respect for agriculture, women, and the environment in Odisha and beyond.
