= Andal =

Tamil Hindu poet-saint

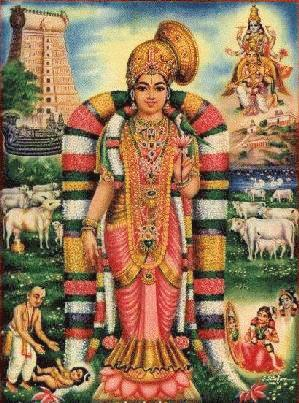
- A painting of Andal

Personal life
- Born: Kotai; Pooram nakshatra in the Tamil month of Aadi, 785 CE Srivilliputhur, Pandya Kingdom, Tamilakam
- Parent: Periyalvar (foster-father)
- Notable works: Tiruppavai; Nachiyar Tirumoli

Religious life
- Religion: Hinduism
- Temple: Srivilliputhur Andal Temple
- Movement: Bhakti

Religious career
- Reincarnation: Bhumi

Andal (Tamil: ஆண்டாள், romanized: Āṇṭāḷ, lit. 'she who rules'), also known as Kodhai (Tamil: கோதை) and Nachiyar (Tamil: நாச்சியார்) is one of the 12 Alvars, who are Tamil saints who patronised Hinduism during the Bhakti movement. She is the only female Alvar. She is considered to be an avatar of the earth goddess Bhumi, who is an aspect of Hindu goddess Lakshmi, the consort of the preserver god Vishnu. As per Hindu mythology, she was raised by Periyalvar in Srivilliputhur, where she grew up as a devotee of Krishna.

Active in the eighth century CE, (Note: The hagiographic tradition asserts that Andal lived around 3000 BCE.) Andal is credited with the composition of the Tamil works, Tiruppavai and Nachiyar Tirumoli, which are recited by devotees during the month of Margazhi. Andal is a prominent figure for women in South India and has inspired several women's groups such as Goda Mandali.

== History ==
According to literary and religious tradition, Periyalvar was a devotee of Vishnu. Childless, he prayed to Vishnu for a child. One day, he found a girl (later named Andal) under a tulasi plant in the garden inside Srivilliputhur Andal Temple. He named the child Kotai, who grew up as a devotee of Krishna, an avatar of Vishnu.

Kotai is believed to have worn a garland before dedicating it to the presiding god of the temple. Upon finding this out, Periyalvar reproached her. Vishnu appeared in his dream and asked him to dedicate only the garland worn by Andal to him because when the new garland was put on Vishnu's idol, it fell down but when the garland was worn by Andal, Vishnu turned into gold. The girl Kotai was thus named Andal and was referred to as "Chudikodutha Sudarkodi", meaning the woman who wore and gave her garland to Vishnu. Periyalvar took Andal to the Ranganathaswamy Temple in Srirangam where Andal was reunited with Vishnu as his bride. The practice is followed during modern times when the garland of Andal from Srivilliputhur Andal Temple is sent to Venkateshvara Temple, Tirumala and Padmavati Temple on Garudotsavam during the Tamil month of Purattasi (September – October) and Kallalagar Sundaravalli Koyil during Chitra Pournami. Andal is also called as Nachiyar or Andal Nachiyar.

Kotai was brought up by Periyalvar in an atmosphere of love and devotion. As she grew into a beautiful maiden, her fervor for Vishnu grew to the extent that she decided to marry only Vishnu himself. As time passed, her resolve strengthened and she thought constantly about marrying Ranganatha (the reclining form of Vishnu on Shesha) of Srirangam in Tiruchirapalli. It was at Srirangam where Vishnu as Ranganatha as Ranganatha married Lakshmi as Bhumi as Andal. Andal is credited with two great Tamil works, Tiruppavai and Nachiyar Tirumoli, which are still recited by devotees during the winter festival season of Margali.

In the Tiruppavai, Andal, as a gopi in Ayarpadi (Vrindavana), emphasizes that the ultimate goal of life is to seek surrender and refuge at Vishnu's feet. Ranganatha of Srirangam married Ranganayaki as Andal, both of whom miraculously went to Vaikuntha, the abode of Vishnu. Her birthday is celebrated as Adi Puram during the Adi month and her wedding day and subsequent ascension is celebrated as Panguni Uthiram in the Panguni month.

== Iconography ==
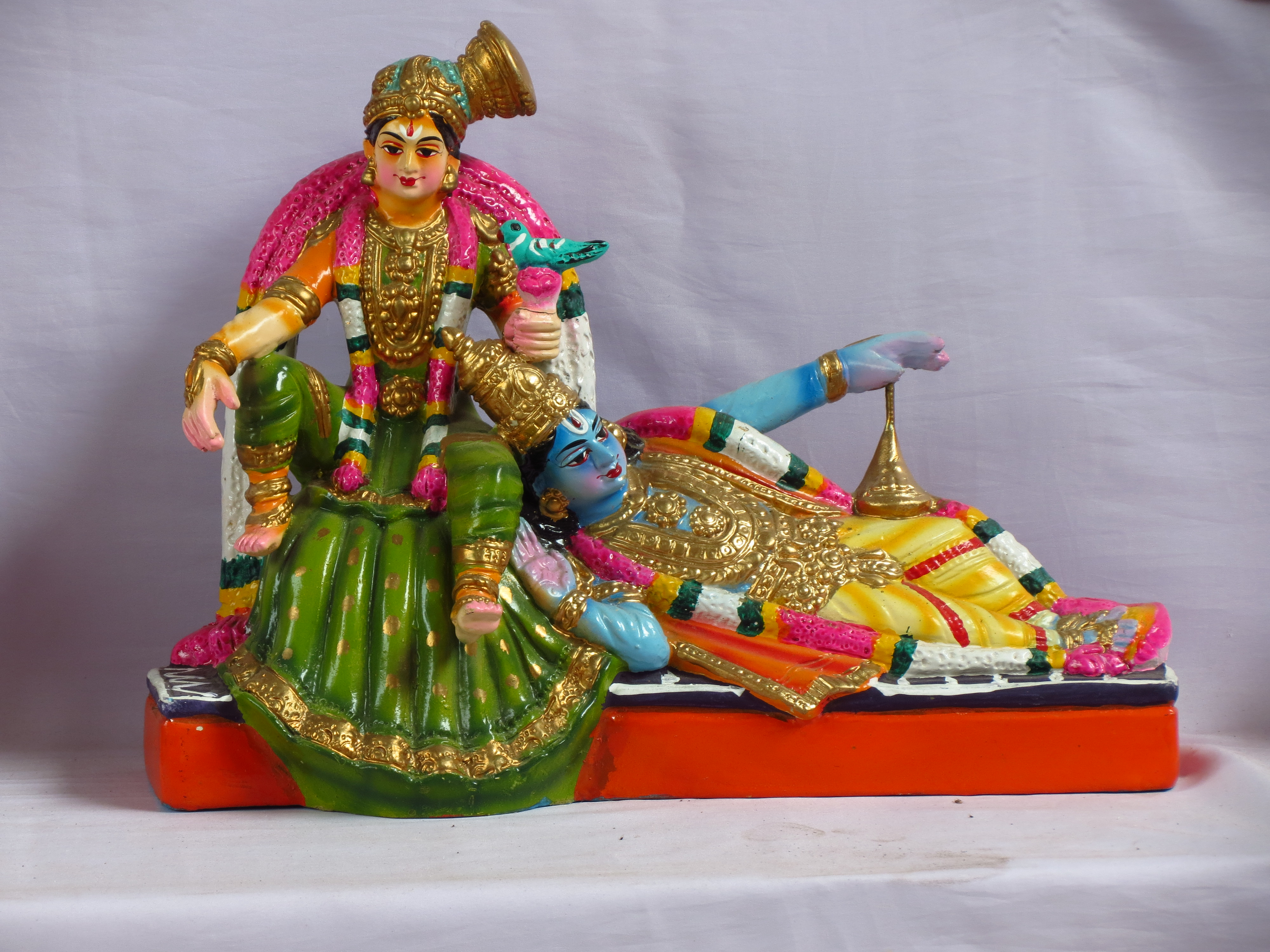
Ranganatha with Andal

Andal's hairstyle and ornamentation are unique to ancient Tamil culture. The tuft of the hair is bunned to the side and adorned with jasmine flowers and elaborate jewellery.

Srivilliputhur Andal's hand-crafted parrot is made with fresh green leaves each and every day. This parrot is kept in the left hand of Andal. A pomegranate flower for beak and mouth, bamboo sticks for legs, a banana fruit for the body, petals of pink oleander flowers for feathers, a pinwheelflower for the head are used to prepare this parrot.

== Literary works ==
Andal composed two literary works, both of which are in the rich Tamil verse form and express literary, philosophical, religious, and aesthetic content.

=== Tiruppavai ===
Her first work is the Tiruppavai, a collection of 30 verses in which Andal imagines herself to be a gopi, one of the cowherd girls known for their unconditional devotion to Vishnu's incarnation as Krishna. In Tiruppavai, Andal idolized Radha as the ideal gopi and also invoked the gopis of Vrindavana. Rukmini is a form of Lakshmi, who is accorded the status of the supreme consort of Vishnu in Sri Vaishnavism. In these verses, she describes the yearning to serve Vishnu and achieve happiness not just in one lifetime, but for all eternity. She also describes the religious vows (pavai) that she and her fellow cowherd girls will observe for this purpose. Andal extols Vishnu's incarnation as Krishna thus in this text:

My dear girls! You all know Vishnu's incarnation as Krishna, who was born in Mathura and who plays in the large waters of the river Yamuna, who shines like a pure lamp among the cowherd folk, the Damodara who brought name and fame to His foster-mother Yashoda! We shall approach Him in all purity, We shall strew pure and choice flowers at His feet and worship Him. We shall sing about Him and we shall unceasingly think of him: and thereby shall our sins, those already did and those we will do in the future, all of them will burn like cotton in fire.

— Andal, Tiruppavai, Pasuram 5

=== Nachiyar Tirumoli ===
The second work by Andal is the Nachiyar Tirumoli, a poem of 140 verses. "Tirumoli" literally means "Sacred Sayings" in a Tamil poetic style and "Nachiyar" means Goddess. Therefore, the title means "Sacred Sayings of the Goddess." This poem fully reveals Andal's intense longing for Vishnu, her lover. Utilising classical Tamil poetic conventions and interspersing stories from the Vedas and Puranas, Andal creates imagery that is possibly unparalleled in the whole gamut of Indian religious literature.

In Nachiyar Tirumoli, Andal wants to marry Vishnu and marries him as Ranganatha and says she would offer Vishnu 1000 pots of akkāravadisal when he marries her, which was later fulfilled by Ramanuja in the 12th century CE.

Nevertheless, conservative Vaishnava institutions do not encourage the propagation of Nachiyar Tirumoli as much as they encourage Tiruppavai because Nachiyar Tirumoli belongs to an erotic genre of spirituality that is similar to Jayadeva's Gita Govinda.

== Significance in Southern India ==
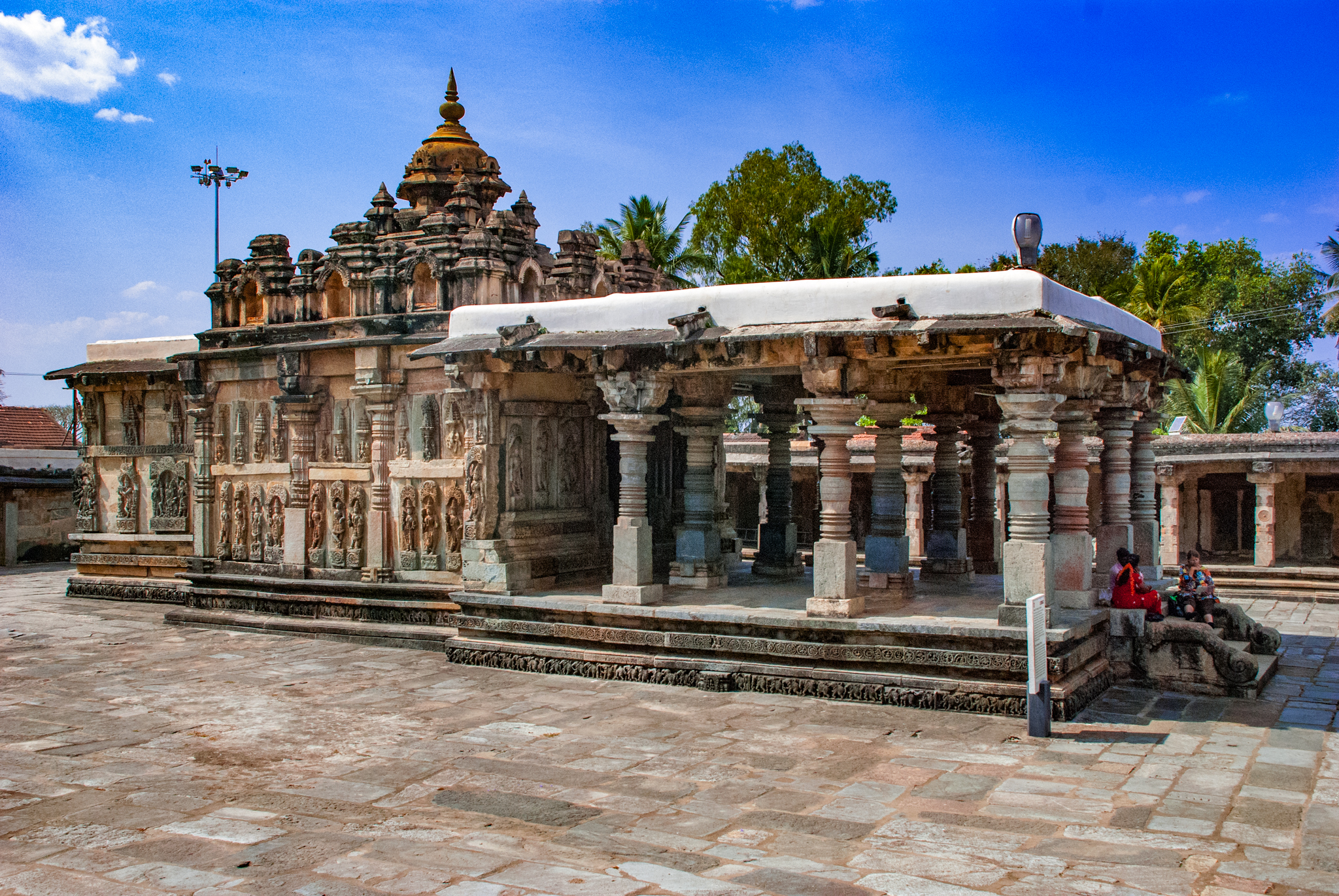
Andal Temple of the Hoysala period, Chennakeshava Temple, Belur

Andal is one of the reputed poet-saints of the Tamils. Pious tradition holds her to be the incarnation of Bhumi (Lakshmi as the Earth goddess) to show humanity the way to Vishnu's lotus feet. In South India, representations of her next to Vishnu are present in Vaishnava temples, many temples also have a separate shrine for Andal. During the month of Margali, discourses on the Tiruppavai in Tamil, Telugu, Kannada, and Hindi take place all over India. The Srivilliputhur Andal Temple at Srivilliputhur consists of twin temples, one of which is to Andal and another temple to Ranganatha. There are a number of festivals dedicated to Andal, among the most notable being the Pavai Nonbu in the Tamil month of Margaḻi (December – January), Andal Ranganatha Tirukalyanam in Panguni, Pagalpattu, Rapattu, Adi Tiruviḻa, when Andal is depicted seated in the lap of Ranganathar. Andal is known for her unwavering devotion to Vishnu, the preserver god. Adopted by her caretaker, Periyalvar, Andal avoided earthly marriage, the normal and expected path for women of her culture, to marry Vishnu, both spiritually and physically. In many places in India, particularly in Tamil Nadu, Andal is treated more than a saint and a goddess herself and a shrine for Andal is dedicated in several Vishnu temples.

Thousands of people from the state of Tamil Nadu participate in the Adi Puram festival celebrated in the Srivilliputhur Andal Temple. After early morning special pujas, the presiding deities, Ranganatha and Andal are taken in decorated palanquins to the car. The festival marks the adoption of presiding goddess, Andal, by Periyalvar after he found her near a tulasi plant in the garden of Andal Temple at Srivilliputhur on the eighth day of the Tamil month of Adi. For Srivari Brahmotsavam, garlands worn to Andal in Srivilliputhur temple are sent to Venkateswara Temple, Tirumala at Tirupati in Andhra Pradesh. These traditional garlands are made of tulasi, chrysanthemum, tuberose flowers. These garlands are worn by Venkateswara during the Garudaseva procession. Every year, Tirupati Venkateswara's garland is sent to Srivilliputtur Andal for marriage festival of Andal. Andal garland is also sent to Madurai Kallalagar Sundaravalli Temple for the Chithirai Festival.

In poetry, 8th-century CE Andal became a well-known Bhakti movement poet, states Pintchman, and historical records suggest that by 12th century CE, she was a major inspiration to Hindu women in South India and elsewhere. Andal continues to inspire hundreds of classical dancers in modern times choreographing and dancing Andal's songs. She is also called Kotai, and her contributions to the arts have created Goda Mandali (circle of Andal) in the Hindu tradition. Through poetry of saints (such as Andal) women are thought to be able to connect with Vishnu directly and those words are thought to encapsulate their personal emotions.

Godha Mandali (circle) which was named after Andal was formed in 1970 and reorganized in 1982, spreads Andal songs widely through TV and radio programs. The group would gather weekly to learn songs and would sing at events such as festivals where they would raise money for shrines.

== Poetry and Literature ==
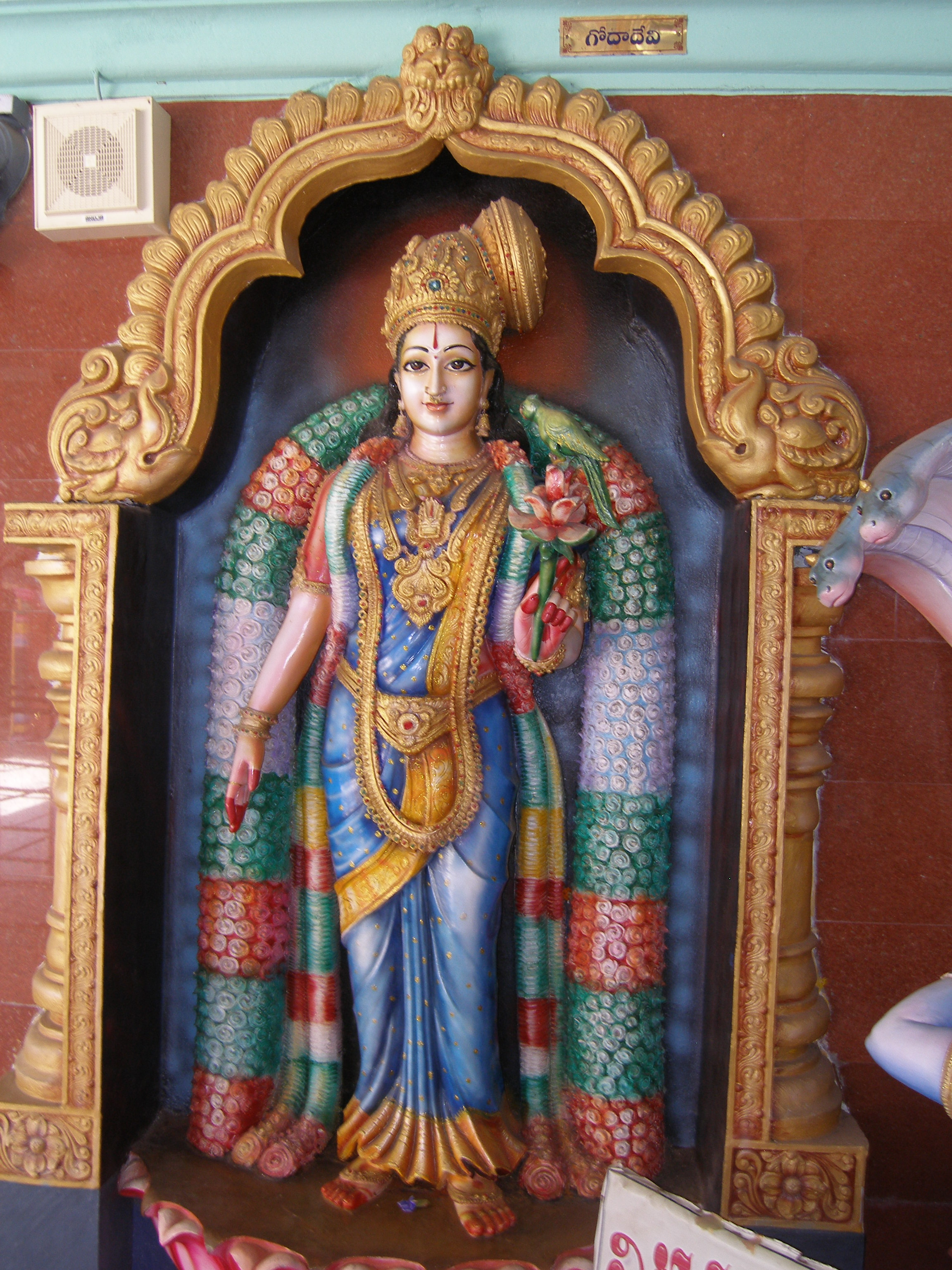
Andal sculpture in Narayana Tirumala Temple, Srikakulam.

=== Bhakti poetry ===
In contemporary commentaries on Tamil bhakti poetry, A. K. Ramanujan's work remarks on how many other religious traditions would keep and treat passionate love and devotion to Vishnu as separate, while in the bhakti tradition, they can be in resonance with one another:

"All devotional poetry plays on the tension between saguna and nirguna, Vishnu as person and Vishnu as principle. If he were entirely a person, he would not be divine, and if he were entirely a principle, a god, one could not make poems about him. The Vaishnavas, too, say that Vishnu is characterized by both 'paratva, 'otherness' and saulabhaya, 'ease of access'; he is both here and beyond, both tangible as a person and intangible as a principle-such is the nature of the ground of all being. It is not or, but both and; myth, bhakti, poetry would be impossible without the presence of both attitudes".

=== Feminist interpretations ===
Several contemporary interpretations view her act of marrying Vishnu as feminist. Divine marriages and virginity allowed women's subjectivity, as she is able to choose her husband, and given an "aristocratic freedom". It is said that by devoting herself to Vishnu and rejecting to marry humans, she avoided the regular works involved with being a wife that would inhibit her freedom.

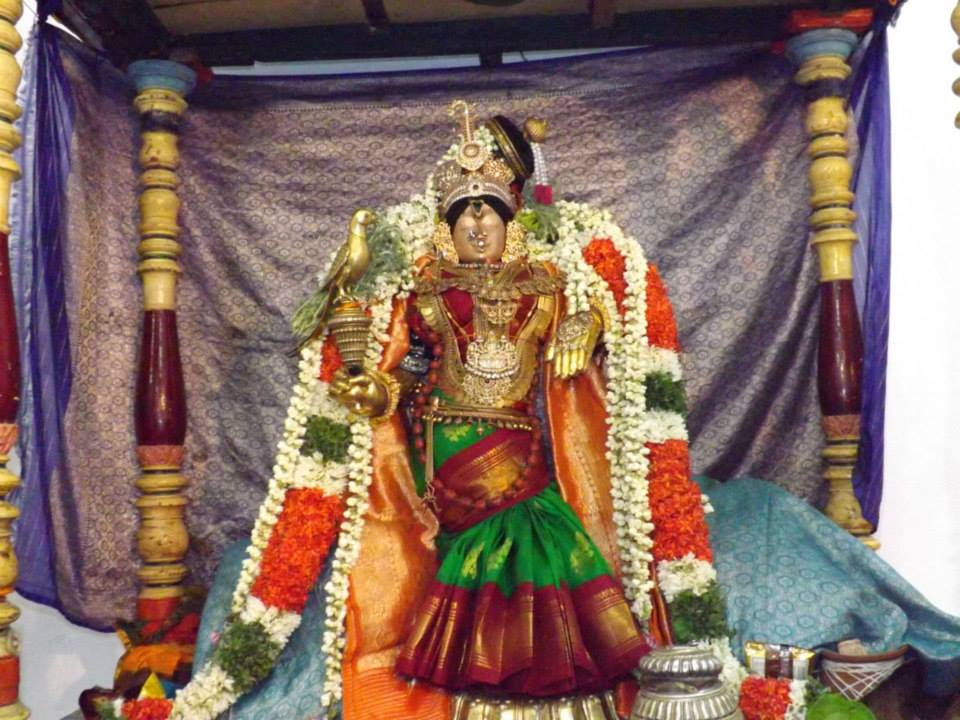
Andal's idol covered in ornaments and garlands

Feminist interpretations look at some of Andal's verses as her open acknowledgement of her love for Vishnu, written with bold sensuality and startlingly savage longing, hunger, inquiry as widely found in Tamil Sangam literature that express women's longings and their separation from their men which ends in their union; even today, her most desirous poems are rarely rendered publicly. In one such verse Andal dispenses with metaphor and imagines herself lying in the arms of Vishnu, making love to him:

My life will be spared, Only if he will come, To stay for me for one night, If he will enter me, So as to leave, The imprint of his saffron paste, Upon my breasts, Mixing, churning, maddening me inside, Gathering my swollen ripeness, Spilling nectar, As my body and blood, Bursts into flower!

William Dalrymple- In search of Tamil Nadu's poet-preachers.

Quoted from Feminism and world religions by Arvind Sharma, Katherine K. Young: "What Andal and other women poets did by living the way they did was to negotiate a space within a marriage-dominated society and made at least some sections of society make room for them".

Andal fulfilled the expectation of becoming a wife by marrying Vishnu, but since her husband is a god, she gained her freedom. This act is referred to as virginal feminism by numerous scholars in patristic and matristic theology. Virginity is viewed as giving women the option to avoid childbearing, male domination and live a new life of devotion to deities.

=== Amuktamalyada ===
Krishnadevaraya of the Vijayanagara Empire composed the epic poem Amuktamalyada in Telugu, which is considered as a masterpiece. Amuktamalyada translates to one who wears and gives away garlands, and describes the story of Andal, the companion of Periyalvar.

Amuktamalyada describes worries of separation experienced by Andal, who is an incarnation of Lakshmi, the wife of Vishnu who marries him ultimately. Further, the poem describes Andal's glory in 30 verses written in the keśādi-pādam style, starting from her hair, going down her body till her feet.

=== Mangalasasanam ===
Mangalasasanam by Divyadesam: Andal has sung in praise of eleven holy sites:

No.	Temple	Location	Image	Pasurams (hymns)	Presiding deity	Notes
1	Srirangam	10.8625°N 78.689722°E		10	Sri Ranganatha Perumal Sri Ranganayaki Thayar	Srirangam temple is often listed as one of the largest functioning Hindu temples in the world, with the more larger Angkor Wat being the largest functioning Hindu temple in the world, which is dedicated to Vishnu and Lakshmi. The temple occupies an area of 156 acres (631,000 m^{2}) with a perimeter of 4,116m (10,710 feet) making it the largest Hindu temple in the Indian subcontinent and one of the largest temples in the world. The annual 21-day festival conducted during the Tamil month of Margali (December – January) attracts 1 million visitors.
2	Vaikuntha	Heaven	Vishnu, Lord of Vaikuntha	1	Sri Paramapada Nathan Sri Periya Piratti	Vaikuntha is the celestial abode of Vishnu and Lakshmi. Vaikuntha is the place of Vishnu and Lakshmi and other deities.
3	Tirupati	13.143°N 79.907°E		18	Sri Venkateshvara Perumal Sri Padmavati Thayar	Venkateshvara Padmavati Temples is landmark Himdu temple situated in Tirumala and Tiruchanur at Tirupati in Chittoor district of Andhra Pradesham, India. The Temple is dedicated to Venkateshvara and Padmavati, a form of Vishnu and Lakshmi, who are appeared here to flourish people in Kali Yuga. Hence the place has also got the name Kaliyuga Vaikuntham and the deities here is referred to as Kaliyuga Prathyaksha Deivangal.
4	Thiruparkadal	Heaven	Kurma	3	Sri Kshirabtha Nathan Sri Kadalmagal Nachiyar	In Hindu cosmology, Kshira Sagara is on Vaikuntha. It is the place in heaven where Vishnu and Lakshmi sit on Shesha and Nagalakshmi.
5	Mathura	27.504748°N 77.669754°E	Kurma	19	Sri Krishna Sri Rukmini	The temple in Mathura, is among the most sacred of Hindu sites, and is worshipping as the birthplace of Krishna. Krishna and Rukmini are deities of this temple. According to traditions, the original deities was installed by Vajranabha, who is the great-grandson of Krishna and Rukmini.
6	Dvarakadhisha Kalyana Temple	22°14′16.39″N 68°58′3.22″E	Dvaraka Temple	4	Sri Dvarakadisha Perumal Sri Kalyana Thayar	The temple is dedicated to the god Krishna and Rukmini, who is worshiped here by the name "Dvarakadhisha" and "Dvarakadhishi", or "King of Dvaraka" and "Queen of Dvaraka". The main shrine of the 5-storied building, supported by 72 pillars, is known as Jagata Mandiram or Nija Mandiram, archaeological findings suggest it is 2,000 years old. The temple was enlarged in the 15th - 16th century CE.
7	Tirumalirunsolai	10.074136°N 78.214356°E	Temple tower	11	Sri Kallazhagar Perumal Sri Sundaravalli Thayar	The temple is constructed in the Dravidian style of architecture. A granite wall surrounds the temple, enclosing all its shrines. The temple has a seven-tiered rajagopuram. The temple is surrounded by a large fort. Kallalagar and Sundaravalli is believed to have appeared sage Suthapavan. The temple follows Thenkalai tradition of worship.
8	Sarangapani Komalavalli Temple	10°57′34″N 79°22′29″E	Temple tower	1	Sri Sarangapani Perumal Sri Komalavalli Thayar	This temple is along Kaveri and is one of the Pancharanga Kshetrams. The temple is believed to be of significant antiquity with contributions at different times from Chola Empire, Vijayanagara Empire and Madurai Nayakas. The temple is enshrined within a granite wall and the complex contains all the shrines and the water tanks of the temple. The rajagopuram (the main gateway) has eleven tiers and has a height of 173 ft (53 m).
9	Tirukannapuram	10°52′7″N 79°42′6″E	Temple tower	1	Sri Sourirajan Perumal Sri Kannapuram Thayar	The deities wore wigs (souris), named Kannapuram Thayar and Sourirajan Perumal. A granite wall surrounds the temple, enclosing all its shrines and three of its seven bodies of water. The temple has a seven-tiered rajagopuram, the temple's gateway tower and a huge temple tank in front of it. The temple is constructed by the Chola Empire, with later additions from the Thanjavur Nayakas.
10	Srivilliputhur	9°30′32″N 77°37′56″E	Temple tower	1	Sri Rangamannar Sri Andal	The temple is associated with the life of Andal, who is an incarnation of Lakshmi without any parents who married Ranganatha, an incarnation of Vishnu was found by Periyalvar under a Tulsi plant in the garden inside this temple. She is wore the garland before wearing that garland to Ranganatha. Periyalvar, who later found the garland, is shocked and taking the garland with Andal's hair. It is Ranganatha appeared in his dream and told him to wear the garland worn by Andal to him and Andal took that garland and wore that garland to Ranganatha and married him there itself, and Andal successfully married Ranganatha, fulfilling the dream of Andal and Ranganatha. It is Ranganatha of Srivilliputhur Andal Ranganatha Temple married Andal, later they ascended to heaven at Srirangam, Tiruchirapalli. The temple has two divisions – the one of Andal located on the southwestern and the second one of Ranganatha on the northeastern side. A granite wall surrounds the temple, enclosing all its shrines, the garden where Andal is born and two of its three bodies of water with the third body of water outside the temple. The Vijayanagara and Madurai Nayaka rulers commissioned paintings on the walls of the shrine of temple, some of which are still present.
11	Gokula	26.95009444667719°N 80.43869165722663°E	Gokul temple	4	Sri Krishna Sri Rukmini	It is known that Krishna lived in his childhood in this place.
