= Tirupallantu =

Hindu benedictory hymn

- Periyalvar Tirumoli →
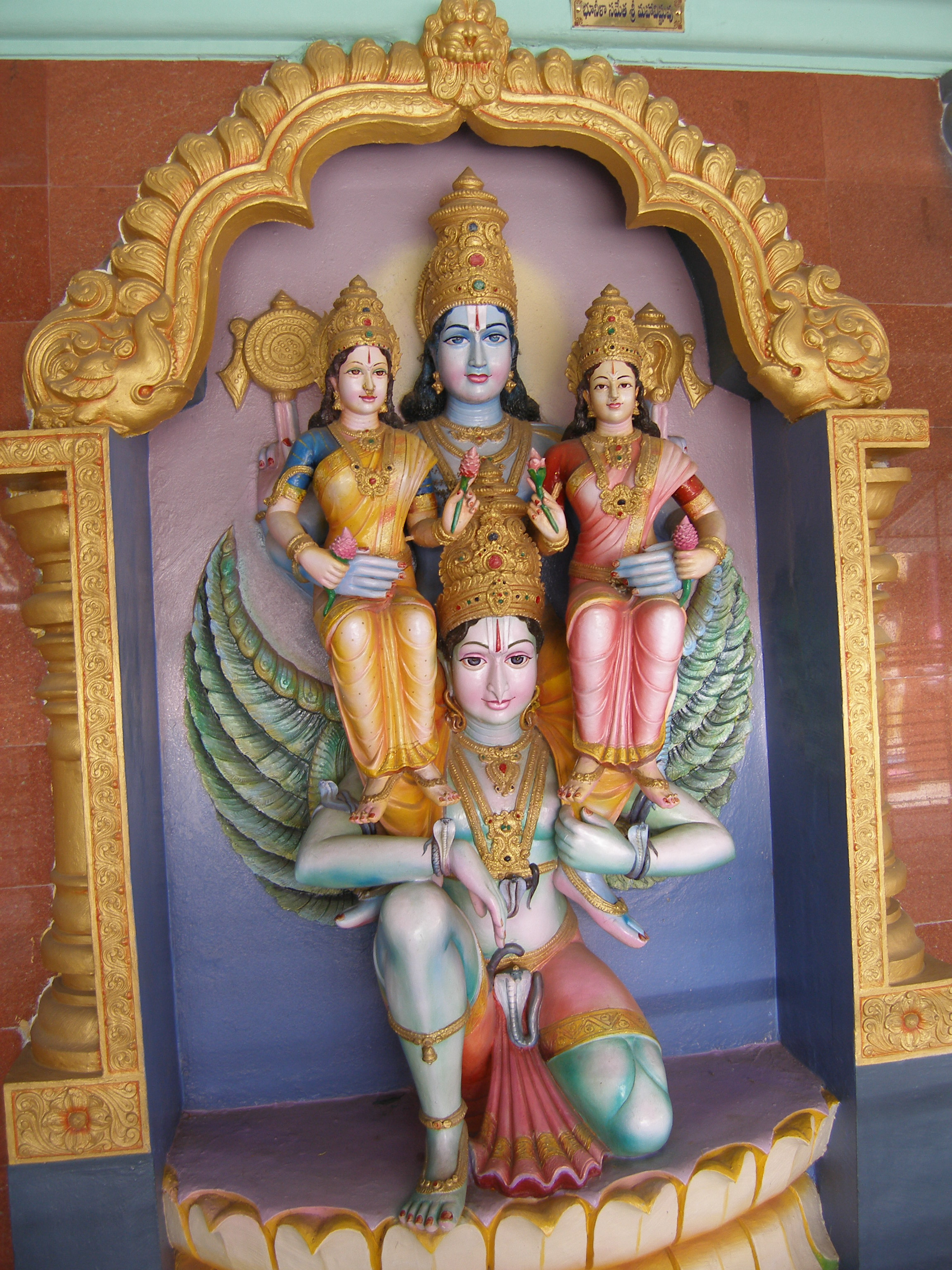
- Statue of Vishnu upon Garuda with his consorts, Tirumala.

Information
- Religion: Hinduism
- Author: Periyalvar
- Language: Tamil
- Period: 9th–10th century CE
- Verses: 12

The Tirupallantu (Tamil: திருப்பல்லாண்டு, romanized: Tirupaḷḷāṇtu), also rendered as the Pallandu, is a Tamil benedictory hymn dedicated to the Hindu deity Vishnu. Composed by the poet-saint Periyalvar, it serves as the opening hymn of the Nalayira Divya Prabandham, medieval devotional compendium of the Alvars. It is also referenced in other works of this anthology, such as the Perumal Tirumoli.

This hymn is commonly recited during morning prayers at temples that adhere to the Sri Vaishnava tradition.

== Etymology ==
Tiru is a Tamil honorific prefix denoting sacredness or holiness, while paḷḷāṇtu translates literally to 'many years.'

== Legend ==
A Sri Vaishnava legend describes the context behind the composition of this hymn. Periyalvar was once invited by the Pandya king to participate in a religious debate. The poet-saint was able to defeat a number of Jain scholars in this event, which won him the praise of the king. He was honoured by the monarch with a procession, where he was taken around the capital while seated upon an elephant. Pleased by his devotee, Vishnu himself descended upon the earth to meet him, upon his mount Garuda. Witnessing the deity's presence, and worrying that he was precariously seated upon his mount, Periyalvar glorified him with the Tirupallantu, wishing him protection and longevity.

== Hymn ==
The Tirupallantu comprises twelve verses. The poet extols the attributes of Vishnu in this work, such as his Sudarshana Chakra and his Panchajanya:

Pallāṇṭu pallāṇṭu pallāyirattāṇṭu
palakōṭi nūṟāyiram
Mallāṇṭa tiṇtōḻ maṇivaṇṇā! Un
ćēvaḍi ćevvi tirukkāppu Aṭiyōmōṭum ninnōṭum pirivinṟi
āyiram pallāṇṭu
Vaṭivāy ninvala mārṗinil vāḻkinṟa
maṅkaiyum pallāṇṭu
Vaṭivārćōdi valattuṟaiyum ćuṭar
āḻiyum pallāṇṭu
Paṭaipōr pukku muḻaṅkum appāñca
ćanniyamum pallāṇṭē

=== Translations ===
Srirama Bharati features a prose translation of the hymn in his translation of the Nalayira Divya Prabandham, named The Sacred Book Of Four Thousand. Kamil Zvelebil features a poetic translation of the hymn by J.S.M Hooper in his book entitled Tamil Literature.

Prose translation (Srirama Bharati)
Many years, many years, many thousands of years,
and many hundred thousands more,
Gem-hued Lord with mighty wrestling shoulders! Your
red lotus feet are our refuge.

To the bond between us,
many and many a thousand years;
To the dainty lady resting on your manly chest,
many and many a thousand years;
To the fiery orb discus adorning your right shoulder,
many and many a thousand years.
To the conch Panchajanya that strikes terror in the battlefield,
many and many a thousand years.

Poetic translation (J.S.M Hooper)
Reverence, reverence be unto thee,
O thou mighty One, who didst overcome
the Mallas,
thou like to the sapphire in glory!
Infinitely blest be the beauty of
for thousands of years,
for crores of years,
for ever!

All hail! Oh may no rift come 'twixt thy slaves and thee!
All hail to Sri, who dwells, thy lustre, on thy right!
All hail, the glorious discus in thy fair right hand!
All hail to Panchajanyam sounding in the fight!

== See also ==
- Periyalvar Tirumoli
- Tiruppavai
- Tirupalliyeḻuchi
