= Periyalvar =

Tamil Vaishnava poet-saint

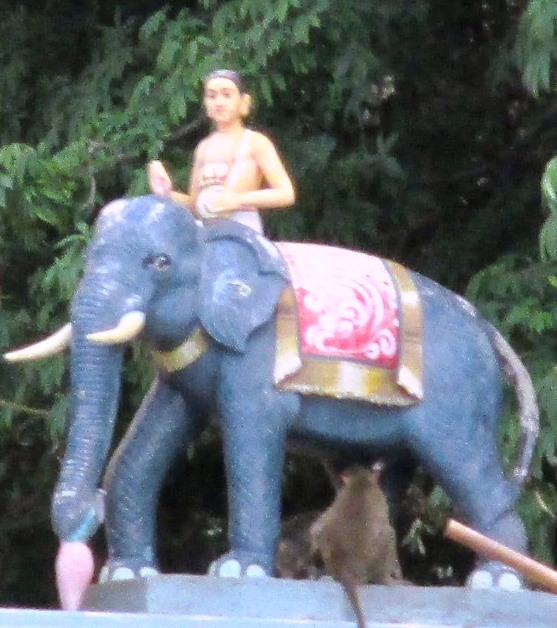

Personal life
- Born: Vishnuchitta c. 9th century Srivilliputhur
- Died: Kallazhagar temple
- Notable work(s): Tirupallantu, Periyalvar Tirumoli

Religious life
- Religion: Hinduism
- Philosophy: Vishishtadvaita

Periyalvar (c. 9th century), also known as Vishnuchittar, was one of the twelve Alvar saints of South India revered in the Sri Vaishnava tradition of Hinduism. He was the foster father of Andal. Andal, also called as Kodhai, is the only female Alvar, and is regarded in Sri Vaishnavism as an incarnation of Bhudevi.

The verses of the Alvars are compiled as the Naalayira Divya Prabandham, and the 108 temples revered in these hymns are classified as Divya Desams. According to some accounts, Periyalvar is considered the first in the line of the twelve Alvars, while other accounts place him as the eighth. His original name was Vishnuchittar. Because he blessed Vishnu out of deep parental affaection (vātsalya) as though he were an elder protecting the deity, he earned the title Perialvar ('the Great/Elder Alvar').

Periyalvar played a significant role in the philosophical and theological development Vaishanvism, a mojor driver behind the Bhakti movement. His main compositions are the Tirupallandu and the Periyalvar Tirumoli, which together form part of the 4,000 stanzas of the Naalayira Divya Prabandham.

In South Indian Vishnu temples, Periyalvar is consecrated through Murtis and celebrated in annual festivals. The Garudasevai festival at the Srivilliputhur temple—in which five neighboring Vishnu temples participate—is a major annual event dedicated to him. The verses of Periyalvar and the other Alvars are recited as part of daily rituals and during major festivals across Sri Vaishnava temples in South India.

== Dating ==
A poem by Periyalvar names the ruling Pandya king as Nedumaran, and states that the king extolled the Lord of Thirumalirumcholai (Vishnu). The Pandyan kings were generally staunch Shaivites; the only king described as a parama-vaishnava ("Great Vaishnavite") in Pandyan inscriptions was Jatila Parantaka (r. c. 765–815), who was also known as Nedunjataiyan. His successor Shrimara Shrivallabha (r. c. 815–862) was known as Nedumaran, although he is not known to have been a Vaishnavite. Either of these kings can be identified as the "Netumaran" mentioned by Periyalvar. Thus, Periyalvar can be placed in the first half of the 9th century.

According to the Vaishnavite tradition, Vishnucittar (Periyalvar) incarnated in the 47th year of the Kali Yuga (3102 BCE).

== Alvars ==
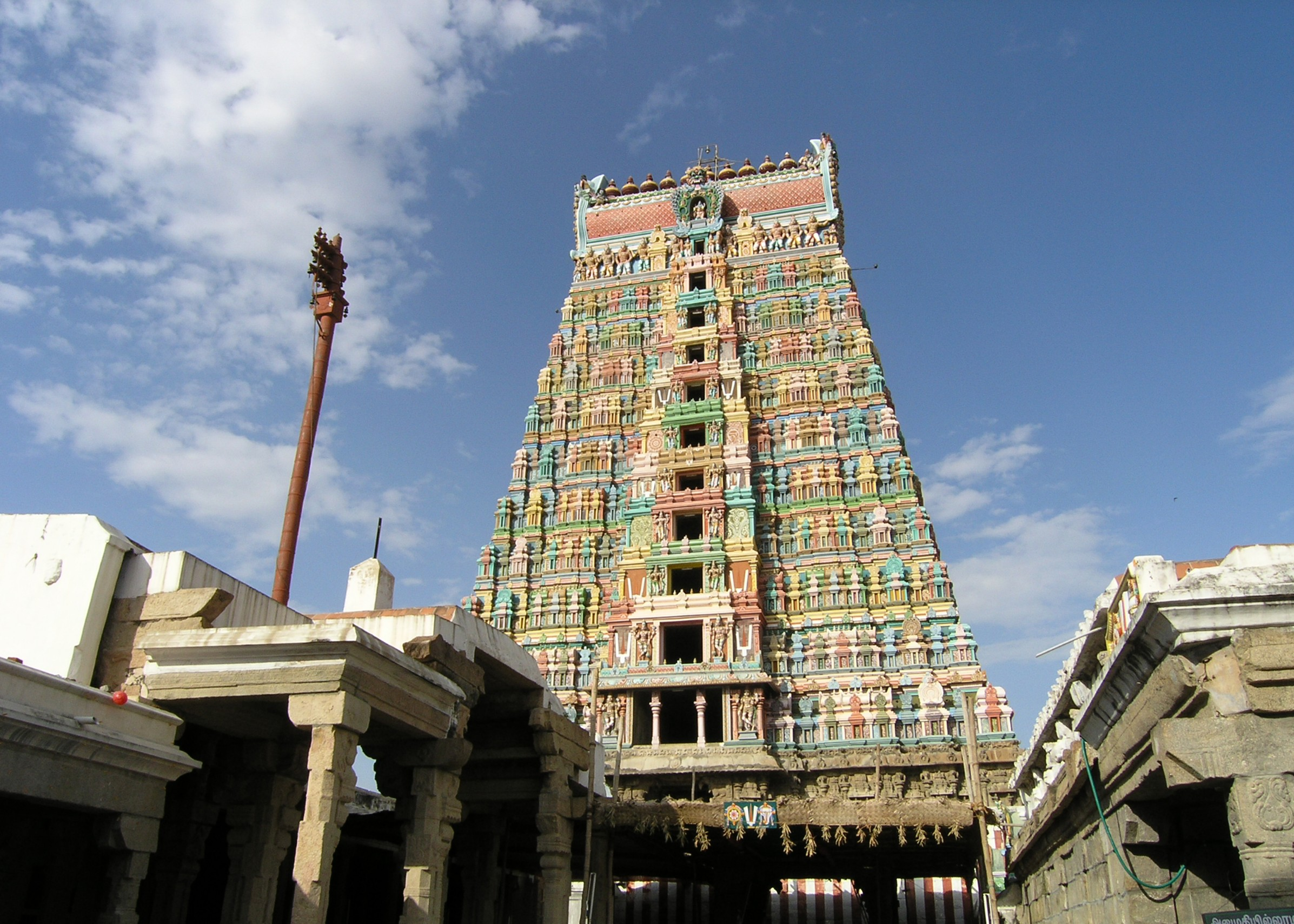
Image of Rangamannar-Andal temple in Srivilliputhur

The word Alvar means the 'immersed', referring to the poet-saints's deep devotion to their supreme deity, Vishnu. The Alvars are considered the twelve supreme devotees of Vishnu in Sri Vaishnavism, who were instrumental in popularising Vaishnavism during the 5th to 8th centuries CE. The religious works of these saints in Tamil, songs of love and devotion, are compiled as Naalayira Divya Prabandham, containing 4000 verses, with each of the 108 temples revered in their songs is classified as a Divya Desam. The saints had different origins, and belonged to different classes. According to tradition, the first three Alvars, Poigai, Bhoothath, and Pei, were born miraculously. Thirumalisai was the son of a sage, Thondaradi, Mathurakavi, Periya, and Andal were from a priest family, Kulasekhara from the Kshatriya varna, Namm from a cultivator family, Tirupana from the Tamil Panar community, and Tirumangai from the Kalvar community.

Divya Suri Saritra by Garuda-Vahana Pandita (11th century CE), Guruparamparaprabavam by Pinbaragiya Perumal Jiyar, Periya tiru mudi adaivu by Anbillai Kandadiappan, Yatindra Pranava Prabavam by Pillai Lokacharya, commentaries on Divya Prabandam, Guru Parampara (lineage of Gurus) texts, temple records and inscriptions give a detailed account of the Alvars and their works. According to these texts, the saints were considered incarnations of some form of Vishnu. Poigai is considered an incarnation of Panchajanya (Krishna's conch), Bhoothath of Kaumodaki (Vishnu's mace), Pey of Nandaka (Vishnu's sword), Thirumalisai of Sudarshanam (Vishnu's discus), Namm of Vishvaksena (Vishnu's commander), Madhurakavi of Vainatheya (Vishnu's eagle, Garuda), Kulasekhara of Kaustubha (Vishnu's necklace), Periya of Garuda (Vishnu's eagle), Andal of Bhudevi (Vishnu's wife, Lakshmi, in her aspect as Bhudevi), Thondaradippodi of Vaijayanti/Vanamalai (Vishnu's garland), Thiruppaan of Srivatsa (An auspicious mark on Vishnu's chest) and Thirumangai of Sharanga (Rama's bow). The songs of Prabandam are regularly sung in several the Vishnu temples of South India daily and also during festivals.

== Early life ==
Periyalvar was born into a Brahmin family in Srivilliputhur, near Madurai and was named Vishnuchittar meaning "one who has Vishnu in his mind". Since his childhood, he had very strong devotion to Vishnu. He renounced many aspects of common life of a man i.e., getting educated, getting married and have children, earning money, but instead focus on Bhakti (devotion), especially on doing simple tasks for god. He would make garlands of flowers for the deity of the Vadapadrasayi temple. Once during random rounds around the city, the Pandyan king Vallabhadeva thought to take rest in a nearby temple. There, a man who renounced his life was singing a song related to liberation or moksha. The king heard this, turned very emotional and the song had a very strong influence in him. Next morning, he declined his kingship and held a competition between scholars to find out the path to liberation. The prize is 1,00,000 gold coins, tied to a large pillar, which will definitely fall if god is convinced about the answer whoever tells. All tries, but the bag doesn't fall down. On the other side, Vishnuchitta was gardening his Tulasi plants at the moment. According to tradition, Vishnu informed about this event to Vishnuchitta who was unaware what was going on in the city. Vishnuchitta despite repeated convince, declined Lord Vishnu's advise to go and win the competition, stating that he had no education, and how can he win the competition that too which has to be explained according to the vedas. Vishnu, took his conch, and placed it on Vishnuchitta's head and mouth, immediately Vishnuchitta became very fluent in Vedas and all other education, just by simple touch by a powerful Panchajanya on his head. He went to the competition ground. Seeing the participants, he was afraid and nervous. But boldly, he placed his anxiety on Vishnu, automatically, he put forward the necessary points and proofs that Vishnu is the ultimate destiny to all, and the bag fell at Vishnuchitta's feet. The king was very happy, and placed Vishnuchitta on an elephant taking him in procession around the streets of Madurai. Vishnu gave his appearance to all the sky of Madurai and blessed Vishnuchitta. Vishnuchitta didn't have a minute pride, and cried to the lord, why is he taken into precession, even though it is the lord who was actual reason for all that is happening. Immediately, he wrote the famous Tirupallantu on the elephant.

Vishnuchitta gave away all the money to charity and he started to do his job again. Vishnu was moved by this for a very simple character of his devotee. Vishnu was thinking, that he has given everything to Vishnuchitta. he have education, money, but Vishnuchitta accepts nothing except devotion. The final thing Vishnu could do is, he can't give anything to Vishnuchitta, but he can give himself to him. Immediately, he sees Bhudevi who was massaging his feet. Bhudevi understood, and on Earth, when Vishnuchitta was offering water to the Tulasi plants, he found a baby crying. He takes her on his shoulder and gets a very unusual happiness and feels her like her own daughter. He also enquired about it to everyone, but all says it's not their daughter. So, he plans to take care of her on his own. Vishnuchitta names her Kodhai.

Vishnuchittar composed a couplet called "pallandu" (பல்லாண்டு) (also called Tirup-Palandu [திருப்பல்லாண்டு] out of respect) translating to "Long live for many years, Long live for many years for Hundreds of thousands of years!" to God. This is a very important prayer in Srivaishnava liturgy today. Vishnuchittar composed some pasurams in the 4000 Divya Prabhandham called Periyalvar Tirumoli where he explores a devotee's love for God through the metaphor of Yashoda's motherly love for Krishna. He was the adopted father of Kodhai or Andal, the only woman Alvar.

Periyalvar was fascinated by the childhood exploits of Krishna and developed devotion and love for God, incarnated as Krishna. And he sang of Krishna, the Child Deity, with maternal love. He was more concerned about the welfare of child Krishna than his own. Because of his love and devotion, he was named Periyalvar, or the great Alvar. Apart from his native Srivilliputhur, he visited Thirukoshtiyur, Sri Ranganathaswamy Temple, Srirangam, Tiruvellarai and Alagar Kovil.

== Significance ==
The devotees of the Sri Vaishnava sect of Hinduism pay respect to the Alvars in addition to their worship of Vishnu. The verses of Alvars are recited as a part of daily prayers and during festive occasions in most Vishnu temples in South India. There are shrines dedicated to the Alvars in most of the Vishnu temples in South India. The Periyalvar Mangalasasanam festival (also called Aani Utsavam) is celebrated every year during the Tamil month of Aadi (July - August) in the Vadapadrasayi temple in Srivilliputhur. The image of Periyalvar receives each of the five Vishnu images for Mangalasasanam. Vadapatrasayee Periya Perumal, festival image of Srivilliputhur Divyadesam, Sundararaja Perumal of Kaatazhagar Temple, Srinivasa Perumal of Tiruvannamalai and Thiru Thangal Appan are received by Periyalvar with different verses from Naalayira Divya Prabandam. In the evening, Garuda Sevai festival is celebrated where all of the festival deities are carried around the streets of Srivilliputhur.

Thousands of people from the state participate in the "Aadi Pooram" festival celebrated in the Andal Temple. After early morning special pujas, the presiding deities, Sri Rengamannar and Goddess Andal are taken in decorated palanquins to the car. The festival marks the adoption of presiding deity, Andal, by Periyalvar after he found her near a Tulsi plant in the garden of Vadabadrasai Temple at Srivilliputhur on the eighth day of the Tamil month of Adi.
