= Periyalvar Tirumoli =

Tamil Hindu work of literature

- ← Tirupallantu Tiruppavai →
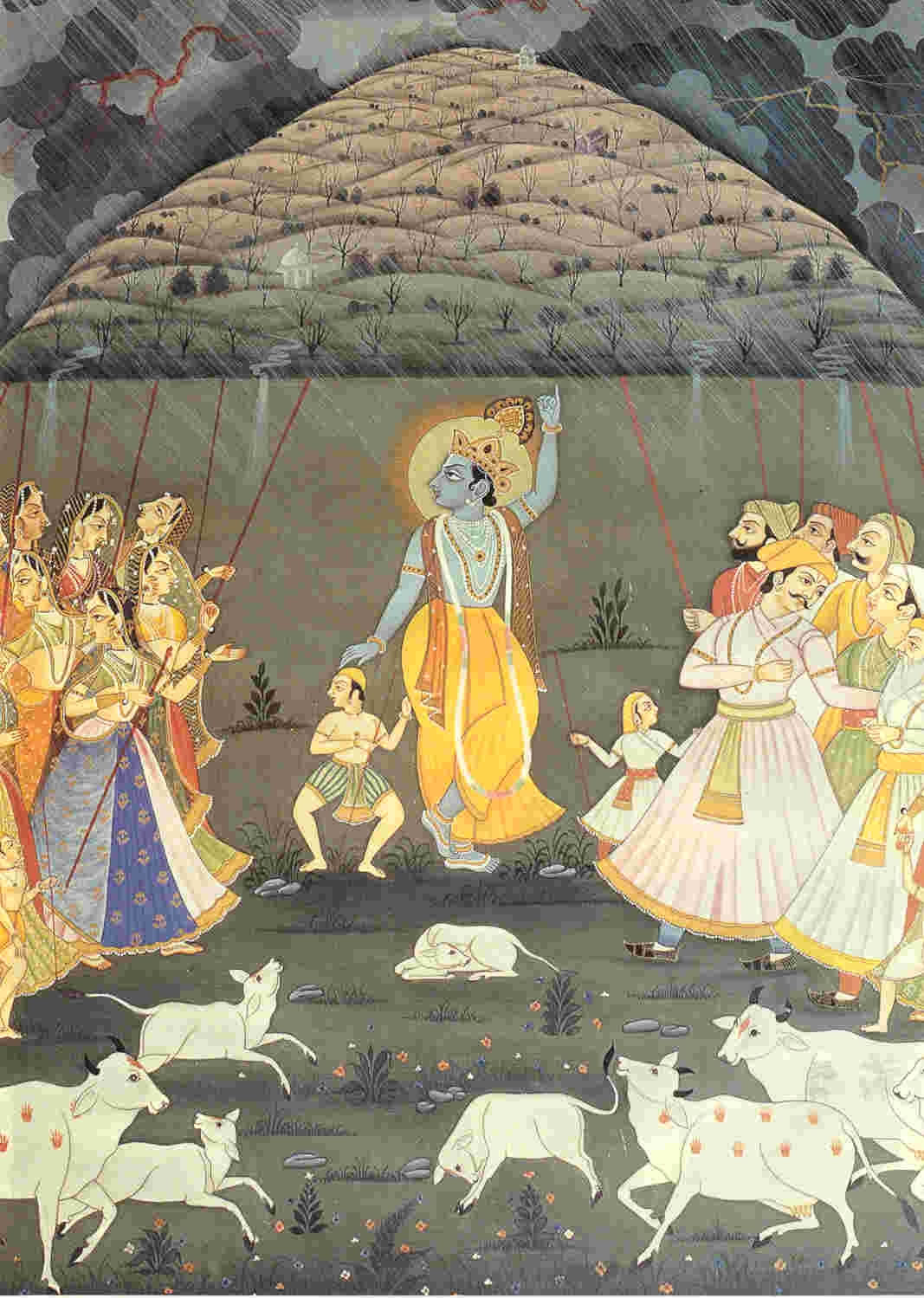
- Painting of Krishna lifting the Govardhana hill.

Information
- Religion: Hinduism
- Author: Periyalvar
- Language: Tamil
- Period: 9th–10th century CE
- Verses: 473

The Periyalvar Tirumoli (Tamil: பெரியாழ்வார் திருமொழி, romanized: Periyāḻvār Tirumoḻi, lit. 'Sacred verses of Periyalvar') is a Tamil Hindu work of literature written by Periyalvar, one of the twelve Alvars, the poet-saints of Sri Vaishnavism. Comprising 473 verses, it is part of the compendium of hymns called the Nalayira Divya Prabandham, dating back to the 9th century CE.

== Hymns ==
A hymn of the Periyalvar Tirumoli describes the temple of Srirangam as the home of the Dashavatara, as translated by Vasudha Narayanan:

This is the temple of him who became
the divine fish, tortoise, boar, lion, and dwarf.
He became Rama in three forms, he became Kanna,
and as Kalki, he will end [these worlds].

— Periyalvar Tirumoli, Hymn 4.9.9

Periyalvar also extols Krishna's act of lifting the mountain, Govardhana:

Like the king of the serpents opening his many hoods
and supporting the vast worlds on it,
The five fingers of Damodara's hand opened
like the petals of a flower
and held aloft Govardhana.

— Periyalvar Tirumoli, Hymn 3.5.7

== See also ==
Topics in Tamil literature
Sangam Literature
Five Great Epics
Silappatikaram	Manimekalai
Civaka Cintamani	Valayapathi
Kundalakesi
Five Minor Epics
Neelakesi	Culamani
Naga Kumara Kaviyam	Udayana Kumara Kaviyam
Yashodhara Kaviyam
Bhakti Literature
Naalayira Divya Prabandham	Kamba Ramayanam
Tevaram	Tirumurai
Tamil people
Sangam	Sangam landscape
Tamil history from Sangam literature	Ancient Tamil music
Religion in ancient Tamilakam

- Kanninun Cirutampu
- Periya Tiruvantati
- Perumal Tirumoli
