= Tiruppavai =

Tamil Hindu work of literature

- ← Periyalvar Tirumoli Nachiyar Tirumoli →
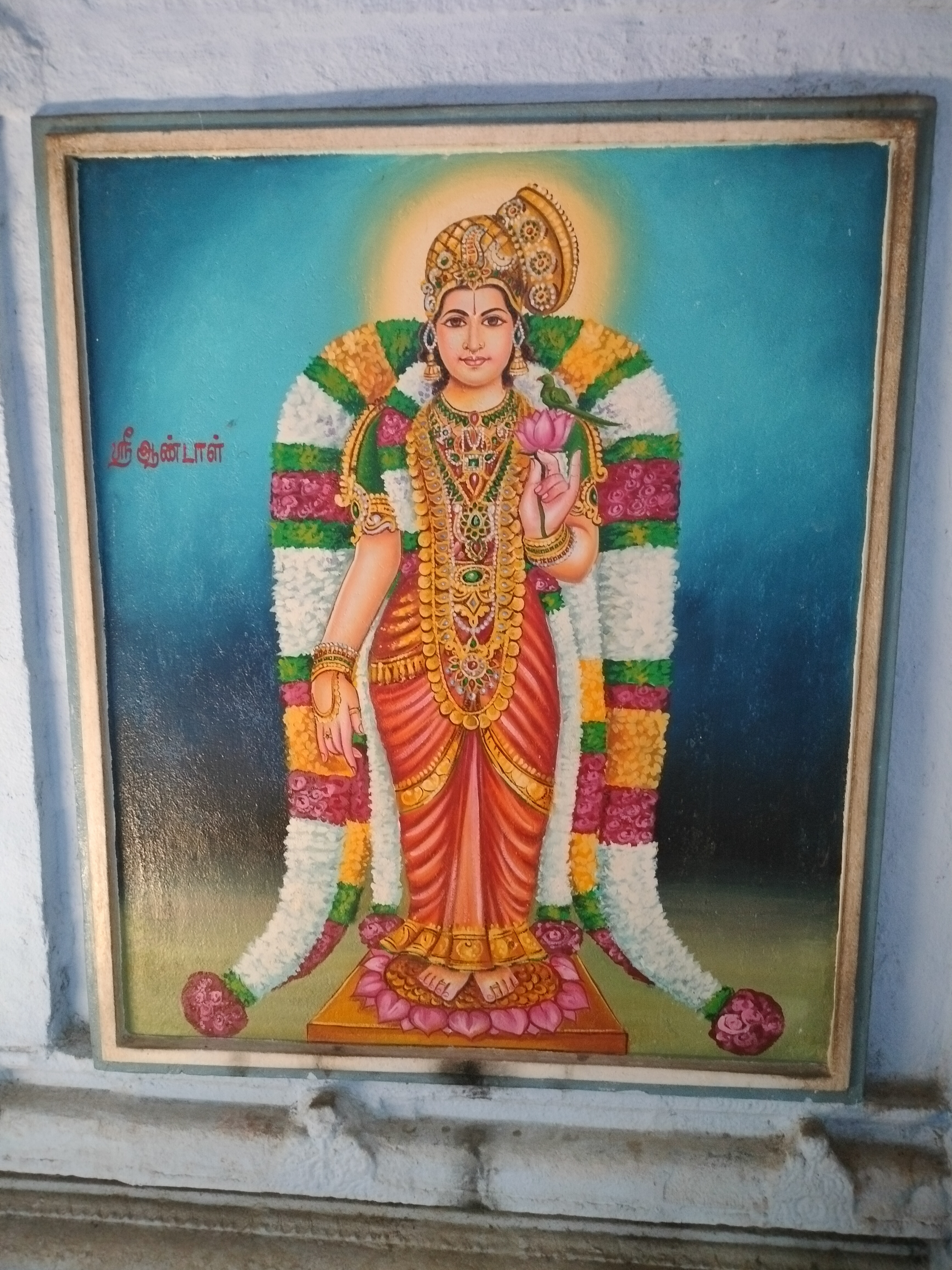
- Painting of Andal, Sri Appan Venkatachalapati Temple, Cheranmahadevi.

Information
- Religion: Hinduism
- Author: Andal
- Language: Tamil
- Period: 9th–10th century CE
- Verses: 30

The Tiruppavai (Tamil: திருப்பாவை, romanized: Tiruppāvai) is a set of Tamil Hindu hymns attributed to the female poet-saint Andal.

The Tiruppavai consists of thirty stanzas referred to as pasurams in praise of Perumal. It is a part of the Nalayira Divya Prabandham, a collection of the works of the twelve poet-saints called the Alvars, an important part of the devotional genre of Tamil literature. The Tiruppavai has also been translated into Telugu by Mullapudi Venkataramana as Melupalukula Melukolupu. In this work, Andal calls upon to all people to recite the name and glories of Vishnu.

== Genre ==
The Tiruppavai belongs to the pāvai genre of songs. This genre referred to the Tamil tradition of unmarried girls performing rites and upholding a vow (vrata) of their performance throughout the month of Margaḻi. This practice assumes special significance during Margaḻi: each day of this month gets its name from one of the thirty verses. There are references to this vow in the late-Sangam era Tamil classic anthology called Paripatal.

Andal's thirty songs contain the cardinal principles of Vaishnavism during the month of Margaḻi. Andal assumes the guise of a cowherd girl in these 30 verses. Andal appears intent upon performing a particular religious vow to marry Vishnu and remain in his everlasting company, inviting of all her friends to join her to serve him with her.

== Theme ==
According to the religious hymns the symbolic undertone behind Andal's entreaty to her friends to wake up and seek Krishna subsumes the essence of the three basic mantras in the Vaishnava tradition — the Tirumantram, Dvayam, and Charama Sloka that signify the truth of the paramatma or the Supreme being who dwells in everything. There is a hidden meaning in the 27th pasuram, for example, where Andal explains the importance of an acharya whose guidance is mandatory for a disciple to get these trio of mantras.

The Tiruppavai is said to be 'Vedam Anaithukkum Vithagum', meaning it is the seed of the Vedas. As the entire tree and the trees coming from it are hidden in the subtle seed, so is the entire essence of the Vedas is hidden in the Tiruppavai which can be revealed only under the guidance of an acharya or a guru who is well versed in Vedic scriptures.

This entire hidden essence is mentioned in the Andal's verses in the form of poetry.

== Overview ==
The first five stanzas provide an introduction to the main theme, its principle and purpose. According to Andal, one should give up luxuries during this season. Sincere prayers to the God would bring abundant rain and thus prosperity. Offering Krishna fresh flowers would expiate sins committed earlier and those that may be committed in future.

In the next ten stanzas she describes the importance of community participation. She invites her friends to gather flowers. She essays the ambience at her village, the chirping of birds, colorful blossoms, the musical sound of butter-churning, herds of cattle with tinkling bells, the sounding of the conch from the temple.

She visits each household and awakens all her friends to join her for a bath in a nearby pond. She also praises the incarnations of the deity. The next five stanzas describe her visit to the temple accompanied by her friends. She desires to render a suprabhatham gently to wake up the deity. The group appeases the temple guards, enters the temple and recites prayers extolling the parents of Krishna and begging them to wake up Krishna and Balarama. Then they approach Niladevi, the consort of the deity, to have a darshana.

The last nine stanzas are on the glories of the deity. On receiving his blessings Andal lists her demands; milk for the vrata, white conch, lamps, flowers, and rich costume and jewellery, plenty of ghee and butter. The concluding stanza is an envoie identifying her as the daughter of Vishnucitthar (Periyalvar) who made this garland of 30 pasurams and says those who recite with devotion will have Krishna's blessings.

== Verses and explanation ==
The Tiruppavai also includes three taniyans (literally, 'singletons' or standalone verses) composed by later authors to introduce older texts. The first thaniyan, 'Nila tungastana ... ' in Sanskrit was composed by Parashara Bhattar, and the next two taniyans, 'Anna vayal pudhuvai ... ' and "Choodi kodutha..." (translated below) were composed by Sri Uyyakondar.

Taniyan

This song is a prelude to Tiruppavai and is one of the 3 taniyans.

Andal from the swan filled Puduvai,
Sang she, in her sweet voice,
Several enchanting sweet odes,
For being sung during,
The worship and adulation of Pavai.
They are but a garland to him,
From her who wore them first,
Before presenting them to Him.

Each pasuram (ode to Perumal) of Tiruppavai is generally named by the first few words of the religious hymns. These are given first and a translation into verse given then:-

Hymn name	Translation
1. Margaḻi Tingal	In this month of Margaḻi, On this day filled with the light of moon, Come for bathing, Oh ladies who are richly dressed, And Oh ladies in rich homes of cowherds, For he with the sharp spear, He who kills his enemies without mercy, He who is the son of Nanda gopa, He who is the darling son of Yasodha, Who wore scented flower garlands, He who is a lion cub, He who is pretty in black colour, He who has small red eyes, He who has a face like the well-lit moon, And He, who is our deity Narayana, Is going to give us protection, So that we bathe and that is our Pavai (vratam or practice), In a way that the whole world sings about.
2. Vaiyathu Vaḻvirgal	Oh, people of this world, Be pleased to hear of those penances, That we daily do for the worship of Pavai, We will sing of those holy feet, Of Him who sleeps in the ocean of milk, We will not take the very tasty ghee, We will avoid the health giving milk, We will daily bathe before the dawn, We will not wear any collyrium to the eye, We will not tie flowers in our hair, We will not do Any act that is banned, We will not talk ill of any to any one else, We will give alms and do charity, As much as we can, And do all those acts to make others free of sorrow, This is our vratam (Pavai).
3. Ongi Ulagalandha	If we sing the praise of Him, Who grew big and measured the world, And worship our Goddess Pavai, Then would there be at least three rains a month, And the red paddy plants would grow big, And in their fields would the fish swim and play, And the spotted bees after sipping honey, To their hearts content, Would sleep in the flower themselves After having their fill, And the cows with big udder Would fill milk pots to the brim, And healthy cows and never diminishing wealth, Would fill the country, And all this I assure by our vratam/practice.
4. Aḻi Maḻai Kanna	Please obey our wishes, Oh rain God who comes from the sea, Enter the sea, please, and bring water to your fill, And with zest and sound take it up, And like the God of the deluge become black, And shine like the holy wheel in the hands, Of The God Padmanabha who has powerful biceps, And make booming pleasing sounds, Like the right spiraled conch, And rain with out stop like the arrow storm, From Saranga the bow of Vishnu and descend on us, To make this world happy, And to help us take bath in month of Margaḻi,
5. Mayanai Mannu	To Him the enchanter of all, To Him the son of Mathura in the north, To Him who played and frolicked, In the shores of holy Yamuna, To Him who is the ornamental lamp, Of the family of cow herds, And to the Damodara who made, His mothers womb holy, We came after a holy bath, And offered pure flowers at his feet, And sang with our mouth, And brought the thoughts of him in our mind, And we were sure, That all our mistakes of the past, And all that we will do in future, Will vanish as ashes in fire,
6. Pullum Chilambina	Did you not hear alternate twittering birds making loud noises, Did you not hear the loud sound of white conch, From the temple of the king of Garuda, Oh, girls please wake up, Let us hear the holy sounds of "Hari, Hari". From the savants and sages, Calling him who drank the poisonous milk from the ghost, Him who kicked and killed the ogre of the cart, And him who sleeps on the great serpent Adi Sesha; So that it goes through our mind, And make our mind cool
7. Kīsu Kīsu	Did you not hear, Oh slow witted girl, The twittering sound of black birds of the morn, Which sounds like a talk between them, Did you not hear the tingling sound, When the big and small coin like pendants, Rub against each other, Did you not hear the sound of vigorous pull, Of the curd churner being pulled, By the flower bedecked cow herdesses, Did you not hear the sound of twirling curd, When churned using the mixer, Oh, leader among girls, How can you sleep, When they sing the names sweetly. Of Narayana and Kesava, Oh, She who is sparkling, Be pleased to open the door,
8. Kīḻ Vanam	The eastern sky has become white, The buffaloes are free to walk and graze, The remaining lasses, have stopped from going, All those who wanted to go, And have come to call you, Oh girl filled with happiness, Please wake up. Let us all sing and get gifts, From Him who has killed the horse like ogre, By pulling apart his mouth, From Him who killed the wrestlers, Sent to kill him, From the Narayana, who is first among the Gods, And prostrate before him.. Please hear what we tell. And decide for yourself,
9. Tumani Madaththu	Oh my uncle's daughter, who sleeps, In the soft cotton bed, In the pearl filled Villa, Well lit from all sides, And full of the smoke of incense, Please open the ornamental door. Oh aunt, why don't you wake her up, Is your daughter dumb or deaf, Or down right lazy, Or she is in trance of deep pleasurable sleep, Let us all call him the great enchanter, Madhavan and he who lives in Vaikunta, By several of His names, And get benefited,
10. Notru Svargam	Oh lady fine, who has entered the heaven, Due to penance done in last birth, Won't you reply, please Won't you open the door, please If we pray the God Narayana, Having with him the scented garland, Made of holy basil, He would give us gifts, many, He is the same who is holy in times ancient, Sent Kumbhakarna to his death, After beating him in the field of war. Did that ogre give you his sleep, Before he went off from here, Oh lass who is very lazy, Oh lass, who is like pretty jewels, Wake up from your sleep, well, And open the door.
11. Katru Karavai	Oh daughter of the cattle baron, Who milks herds of cows, And wages war on enemies And makes his enemies lose their strength, Oh Golden tendril, Oh lass who has the mount of venus, Like the hood of the snake, Wake up and come, When your flock of friends, Have come to your courtyard, And sing of Krishna, Who has the colour of the cloud, Oh rich, rich lady, How can you neither move nor talk, And lie in deep trance,
12. Kanaithilam Katrerumai	Hey, sister of the rich one, who owned, The mooing she buffalo with a calf, Which took pity on the calf, And gave out plenty, Of milk to it through its udder, And made his courtyard slushy with milk, We are assembled in thine yard, In the dripping fog, And sing about Him, Who killed in anger the king of Southern Lanka, And who is very dear one, But open your mouth, you don't.. At least wake up now, Why this very deep slumber, For people of all houses around, Have already become alert
13. Pullin Vāi Kīndanai	The lasses have reached, The place of prayer for Pavai, Singing the fame of our deity. Who killed the ogre who came like a stork. And who cut off the heads of the bad ogre, One by one. Venus has risen in the morning, Jupiter has vanished from the sky, The birds are making lot of sound, Of beautiful one with wide eyes red as a flower. Without taking bath by dipping again and again in ice cold water, Would you prefer to sleep. Oh lass, On this holy day, Do not stay aside, And come to bathe with us.
14. Ungal Puḻakkadai	In the pond in the backyard of your house. The lily in the ponds have opened, The night flowers have closed, The white toothed sages, Who wear clothes as red as, The powder of brick, Are going to their temples. To sound the conch. You who promised to wake us up, Please wake up, Are you not ashamed, You chatter box, Let us all sing about the lotus eyed one, Who has a holy conch and disc in his hands,
15. Elle Ilam kiliye	"Hey, little bird, Are you still sleeping?" "Don't disturb my sleep, Lasses, I will just come". "You are good in your speech, We know what you mean." "You be good, but leave me alone" "Come quickly, why is it different for you?" "Have every one gone?" "Gone, think they have gone" "Please wake up and sing, Of he who killed the big elephant, Of him who can remove enmity from enemies, And of him who is the holy enchanter,
16. Nayaganāi Ninra	Hey, He who guards the palace of Nanda Gopa, Hey, who guards the ornamental door with flags, Please be kind to open the door with bells, For yesterday the enchanter Kannan, Has promised to give beating drums, To us the girls from the houses of cow herds. We have come after purification, To wake Him up with song, So do not talk of this and that, Hey dear man, And open the door with closed latches,
17. Ambarame Tannīre	Hey Nandagopa, who does good deeds and charity, Who gives water, cloth and food to others, Please wake up. Our lady Yasodha, who is the light of the homes of cow herds, She who is dear to all the ladies, Please wake up Hey, Krishna who is the king of Gods, Who went up tearing the sky. Please wake up, and do not sleep. Hey Baladeva, who wears pure golden anklets, Please wake up along with your brother,
18. Undhu Madha Kalitran	Hey, Who is the fair daughter-in-law, Of Nanda gopa, who has several elephants, And who is a great hero who never ran away from his enemies, Hey Lady Nappinnai, who has hair surrounded by holy scent, Please be kind to open the door. The cocks are everywhere waking us up, The koels flock on the jasmine Pandals, And coo so that we all wake up, Hey Lady who happily plays ball, To help us sing your Lords fame, With your hands with tingling bangles, Please open the door with happiness,
19. Kuttu Vilakeriya	In the light of the oil lamp, On the ornamental four legged ivory cot, On the soft bed filled with cotton, Reclining on the busts of Nappinnai, You sleep, Oh he who has a flower like heart, Please open your mouth. She who has, wide black eyes with collyrium. We know that you will never allow him to wake up, For you can never bear to be away from Him, This is not that good, And cannot be accepted by us.
20. Muppatu Muvar	Please wake up Oh, deity, Who removed sorrow and fear, From the thirty three sections of Devas, Even before they approached you, Oh deity, Who is glittering like gold, Oh deity, who has inimitable valour, Please wake up, Oh Lady Nappinnai, Who has desirable busts like golden pots. Who has little red mouth, And who has thin narrow hips, Please wake up, Oh Goddess of wealth. Please give mirror and fan, Just now to your consort, And allow us to take bath,
21. Etra Kalangal	Oh son of him, Who owned several cows, Which gave so much milk, That always the milking vessel got overflowed, Please wake up. Oh deity, who is full of mercy, Oh deity, who is better than the best, Oh lord, who is the light that began the world, Please wake up. Like your flock of defeated enemies, Falling at your feet in surrender, We came praising you, So that we get fame,
22. Angan Mā Jnalathu	Like all the famous kings Of the wide World, that is pretty, Have crowded near your cot, After surrendering their ego, We also have come near. Will not the sight, Of your red eyes which is like the lotus Fall little by little on us? If you see us using those eyes, Which are like sun and the moon, All the curse on us will vanish,
23. Māri Malai Muḻainjil	Like the majestic lion wakes up with ire, From the mountain cave in the rainy season, Looks with fiery sight, And with deep angry sweat from all the hairs, Turns up its head with awe, And comes out making much din, Hey deity, who is the colour of the blue lotus, Come from your temple to here, And sit on the majestic royal throne, And hear with compassion, For why we have come here,
24. Anru Ivvulagam	We worship your feet which measured the world then, We worship your fame of winning over the king of Southern Lanka, We worship thine valour in breaking the ogre who came like a cart, We worship thy strength which threw the calf on the tree, We worship thine goodness in making the mountain as an umbrella, And we worship the great spear in your hand, which led to your victory, We have come here to sing always for ever your praises, And get as gift the drums to sing,
25. Oruti Maganāi Pirandu	Being born to woman, And in the same night in hiding. You became the son of another, But this he could not tolerate, And wanted to cause more harm to you, And you great one, became, The fire in the stomach of that Kamsa, We have come here with desire for a drum, And if you give the drum to us, We would sing about thine great fame and wealth, And would end our sorrows and become happy,
26. Māle! Manivanna	Oh Vishnu, Oh lord who is like the blue sapphire, If you ask us what we need, In your great grace and great deeds, For our holy bath of Margaḻi, We will ask for very many conches Like the milk white conch of yours called Pancha Janya, Very many big drums whose sound can be heard everywhere, Several musicians of fame to sing “Pallandu ” Several beautiful pretty lamps, Several flags and cloths to make tents, Oh, He who sleeps on a banyan leaf at time of deluge, Please give us them all,
27. Kudārai Vellum	Hey Govinda, who is known for victory over enemies, After singing you we will get drums and many gifts, And after being praised by all the people, Wear we will the golden flower on our hair, Wear we will golden bracelets, Wear we will golden ear studs, Wear we would then the golden flowers on the ear, Wear we will ornaments on the legs, Wear we will pretty new dresses, Eat we will rice mixed with milk, Covering the rice fully with ghee, And with the ghee dripping from our forehands, We will be together and be happy,
28. Karavaigal Pin Chendru	Belonging to the ignorant family of cow herds, Drive we would the cattle to the forest, And there we would all eat together, But We are blessed that you are one of us.. Oh Govinda who does not have any short comings. None can ever break the ties that we have with you, Oh deity, We are but ignorant girls, who do not know the world, And in ignorance and love we have called you by name. So please be not be angry on us, And please give us drums, Oh deity,
29. Chitram Chiru Kale	Please hear why, In this very early dawn, We have come to worship, Your golden holy feet. You were born in our family of cow herds, And we are but there to obey your every wish, And not come to get only the drums from you, Oh Govinda. For ever and for several umpteen births, We would be only related to you, And we would be thine slaves, And so please remove all our other desires,
30. Vanga Kadal Kadaintha	He who sings with out error, The thirty odes in sweet Tamil, Of the story of how the rich ladies, With faces like moon, Who worshipped and requested, The Madhava who is also deity Kesava, Who churned the ocean of milk, For getting a drum to worship Goddess Pavai, As sung by Kodhai who is the dear daughter, Of Vishnu Chitta the bhattar, From the beautiful city of Puduvai, Will be happy and get the grace, Of our Vishnu with merciful pretty eyes. And four mountain like shoulders, for ever.

== Recital in Thailand ==
In Thailand, an annual Giant Swing ceremony known as Triyampavai-Tripavai was held in major cities until 1935, when it was abolished for safety reasons. The name of the ceremony was derived from the names of two Tamil Hindu chants: Thiruvempavai (a Shaivite hymn by Manikkavacakar) and Tiruppavai. It is known that Tamil verses from Thiruvempavai — poet pratu sivalai ("opening the portals of Shiva's home") — were recited at this ceremony, as well as the coronation ceremony of the Thai king. According to T.P. Meenakshisundaram, the name of the festival indicates that Tiruppavai might have been recited as well.

== See also ==
- Tirupallantu
- Nachiyar Tirumoli
- Periyalvar Tirumoli
