= Maa Pratyangira Kalika Alayam =

Temple in India

Coordinates: 12.7270°N 77.8699°E

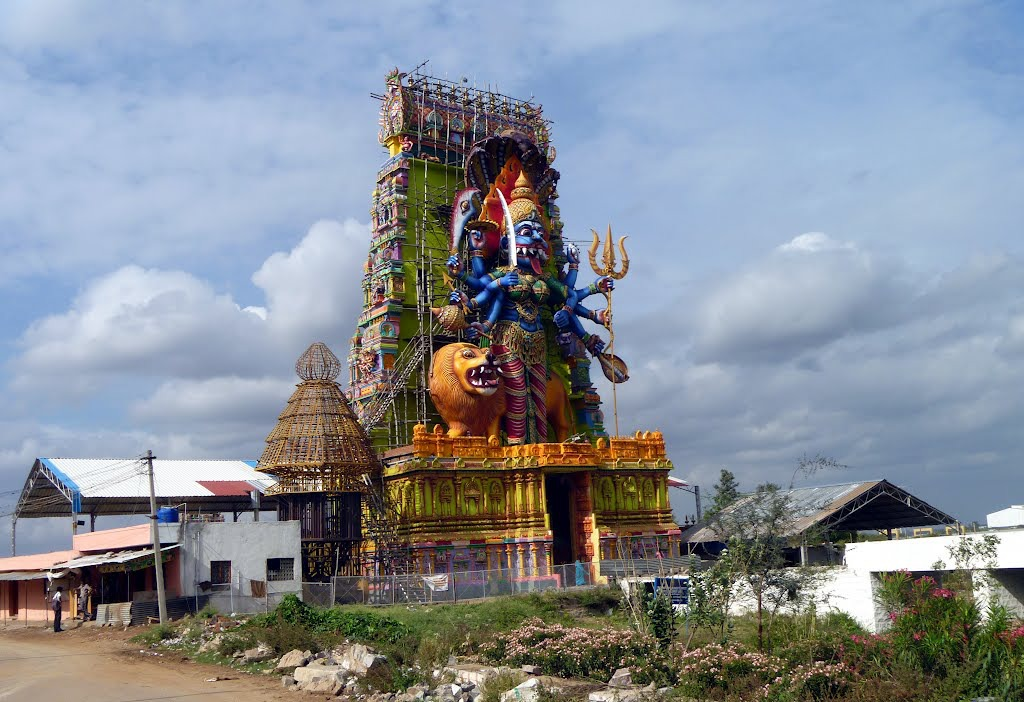
The gopuram of the temple

Maa Pratyangira Kalika Alayam is a temple located in Moranapalli, Hosur, Tamil Nadu. It has the biggest Pratyangira statue and it is on the gopuram on the temple. The temple has many people in the weekends and on weekdays. The temple worships Pratyangira, Sharabha, Narasimha, and Mariamman.

Inside the temple, there is a long waiting until you get inside the temple. The temple then has Simha's mouth open wide where the people worship. People worship Pratyangira by putting garlands and setting Vilakku (ghee lamp) under Pratyangira's feet.

== Gallery ==
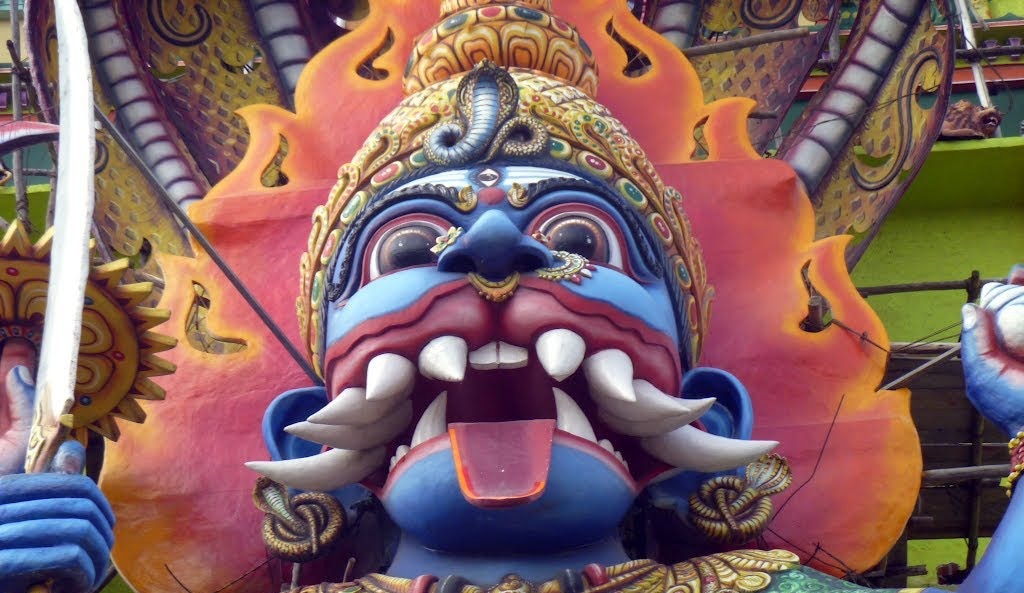
Close-up of the pratyangira statue.

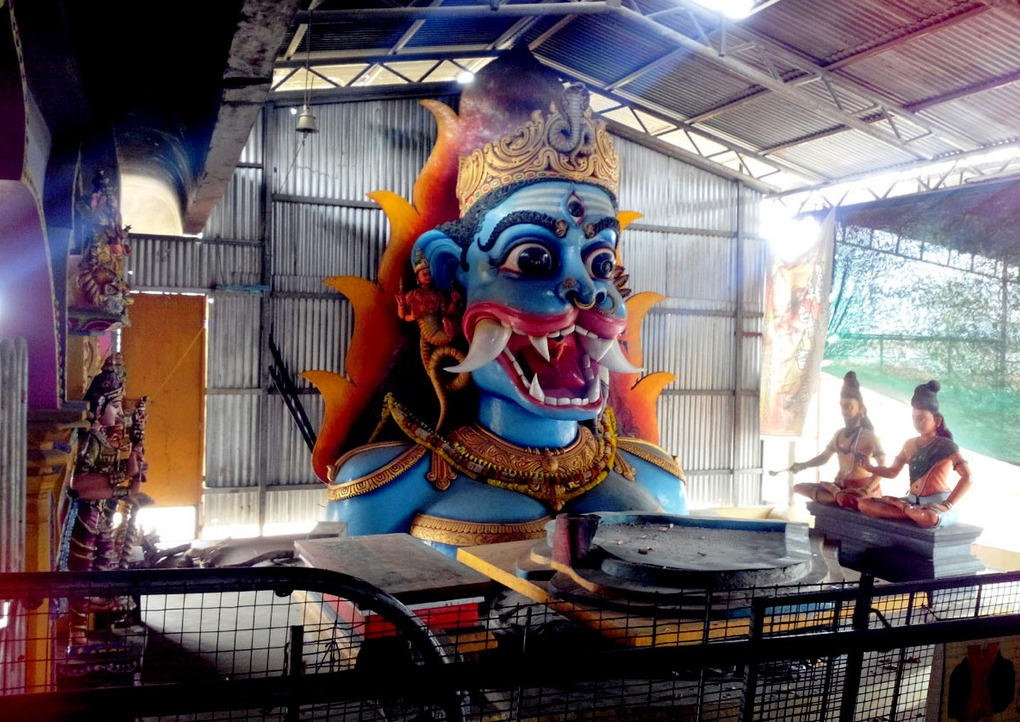
Pratyangira's shrine inside the temple.

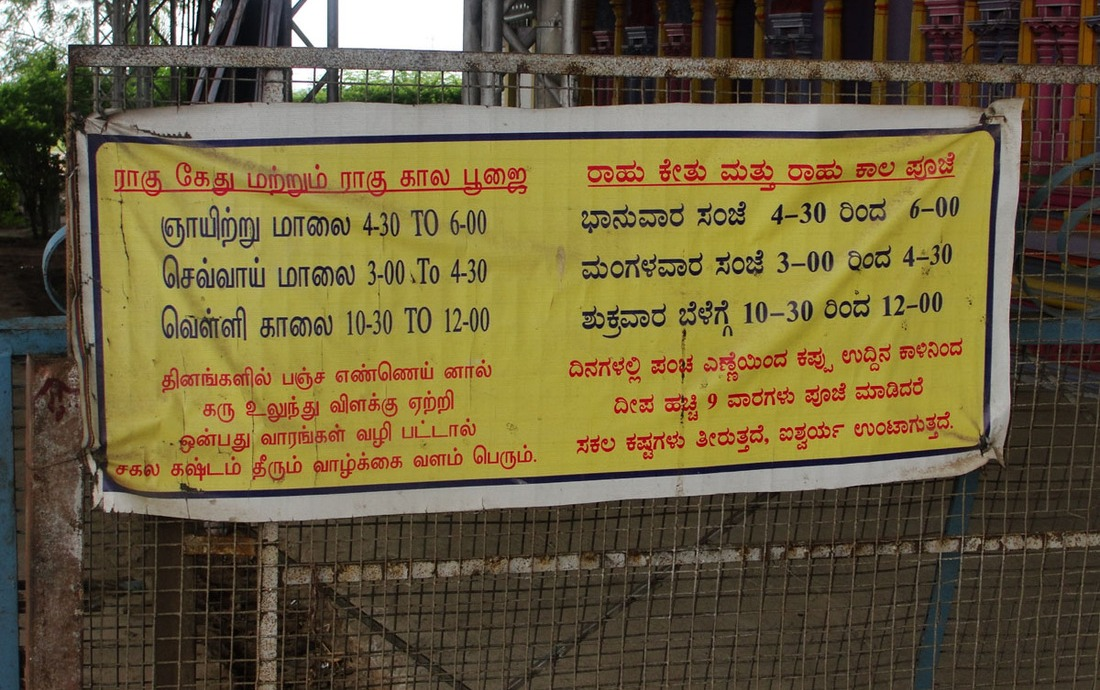
The temple's hour sign.

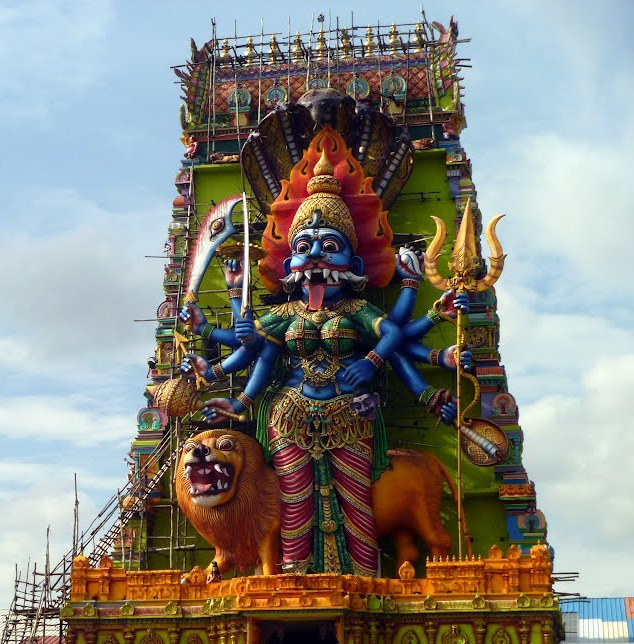
Close up of the rajagopuram.

== See also ==
- List of Hindu temples in Tamil Nadu
- Bannari Mariamman Temple
