= Sholinganallur (disambiguation) =

Sholinganallur is a residential locality of Chennai, India.

Sholinganallur may also refer to:

- Sholinganallur (state assembly constituency)
- Sholinganallur taluk
- Sholinganallur Prathyangira Devi Temple
