= Prathyangira Devi Temple, Ayyavadi =

Temple in India

Prathyangira Devi Temple is a Hindu temple (mandir) located at Ayyavadi in the Thanjavur district of Tamil Nadu, India. The temple is dedicated to Goddess Pratyangira Devi - a powerful incarnation of Goddess Adishakti and the female consort of Lord Sharabha.

In this temple, there are idols of Goddess Lakshmi and Goddess Saraswathi placed nearby the idol of Goddess Pratyangira. Goddess Lakshmi is standing in her Pratyangira form and also in her normal form.

== Significance ==
The temple is more than 1000 years old and is associated with legends of the MahabharataIt is believed that this temple was visited by Pancha Pandavas before Mahabharata war and hence the banyan tree outside this temple has leaves bearing five different shapes.The main idol of Prathyangira devi is not sculpted but believed to be a swayambu(idol forming on its own)from the surrounding eight graveyards. The temple itself is situated inside a past graveyard. Every year a homa is conducted in which lots of red chillies are burnt but it doesn't cause any burning to nose or eyes. Prathyangira devi protects her devotees from black magic, evil eyes provided the devotee is geniune. The idol of Prathyangira Devi is flanked by those of Lakshmi and Saraswati.
