= Pratyangira =

Hindu goddess

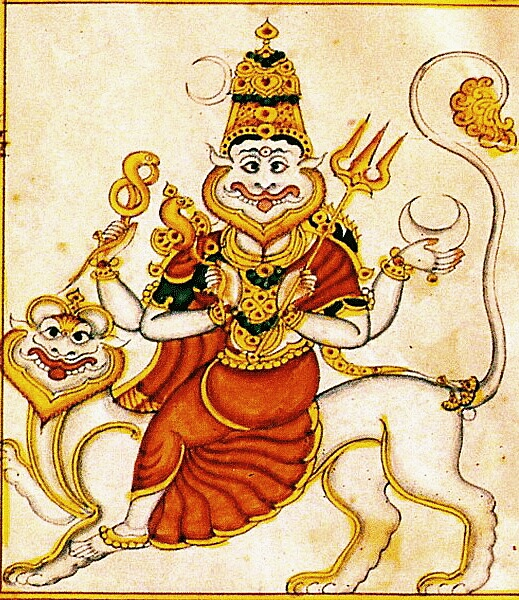
- Pratyangira upon her lion mount
- Other names: Atharvana Bhadrakali, Kubjika, Mahalakshmi, Nikumbhila, Narasimhini
- Affiliation: Parvati; Kali; Lakshmi; Tripura Sundari
- Weapon: trishula (trident), damaru (drum), kapala (skull), pasha (rope or snake)
- Mount: Lion
- Texts: Atharvaveda, Devi Bhagavata Purana, Kalika Purana

Genealogy
- Spouse: Shiva in the form of Sharabheshvara

Pratyangira (Sanskrit: प्रत्यङ्गिरा, IAST: Pratyaṅgirā), also called Narasimhini, Atharvana Bhadrakali, and Nikumbhila, is a Hindu goddess. She is described to be the shakti (female replica) of the deity Narasimha. Despite this, she is popularly regarded as the consort of Shiva. She is one of the Matrikas, a group of seven mother goddesses especially venerated in the Shakta and Tantra traditions.

== Literature ==
In the Vedas, Pratyangira is represented earliest in the form of Atharvana Bhadrakali, the goddess of the Atharva Veda and magical spells.

Additionally, the Bhavrichopanishad (verse 8), a Shakta Upanishad associated with the Atharvaveda, identifies Pratyangira with Sri Mahatripurasundari through a fifteen-lettered hymn, associating her with primordial cosmic energy.

Moreover, the Netra Tantra describes the goddess Pratyangira as a form assumed by Lakshmi, the consort of Amritesha, to rescue those afflicted by the sorcery of sorcerers.

According to the Devi Mahatmya, in order to assist Chandika in her battle against the asura army of Shumbha and Nishumbha, the male gods manifested their female energies as goddesses. Narasimha's energy manifested as Narasimhi, described to be similar to his own form.

The Bhavani-Sahasranama Stuti lists Narasimhi, as the 77th name of Parvati/Durga. It associates her with compassion and the protector of Prahlada from his father, Hiranyakashipu.

According to the Tripura Rahasya, she is a manifestation of the wrath of Tripura Sundari, coupled with Mahāśarabha.

Pratyangira is also mentioned in the Hindu epic Ramayana. Indrajita is described to have begun to perform the Nikumbhila yajna, a ritual to worship Nikumbhila—another name for Pratyangira—while Rama and his soldiers were waging war in Lanka. Hanuman is described to have arrived at the site and stopped the ritual because its completion would have granted invincibility to Indrajita. Consequently, Lakshmana was able to defeat and kill Indrajita in the Battle of Lanka.

According to an lesser-known lore, Pratyangira emerged as the shakti of one of Sharabha's wings during his battle with Narasimha, who had assumed the form of Gandabherunda Narasimha. Depicted with a thousand faces and arms, she played a pivotal role in pacifying Narasimha's wrath and eventually destroying him. A related association appears in the Uttara-Kamika Agama, which identifies the goddesses Kali and Durga with Sharabha's two wings.

== Iconography ==
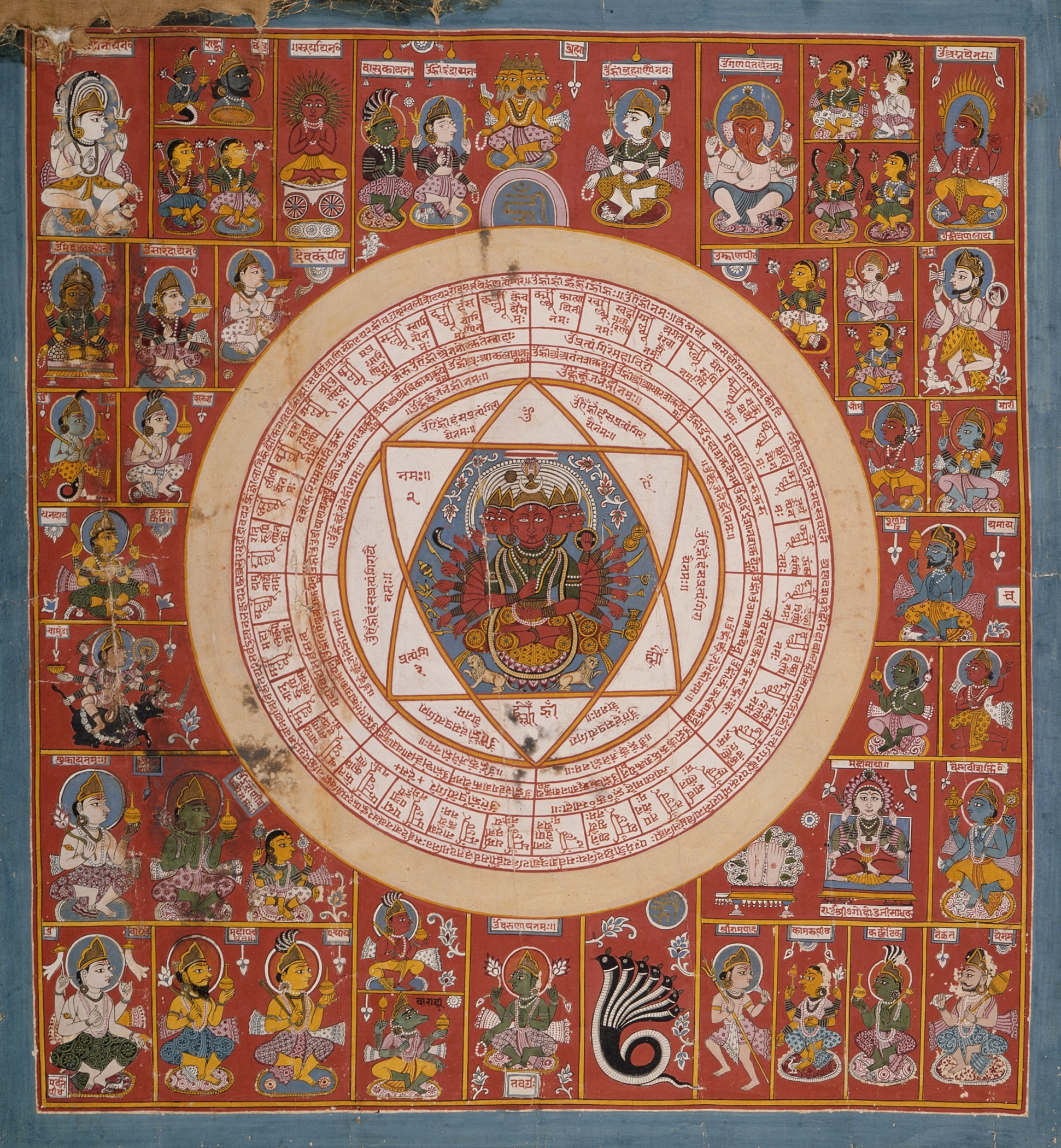
The Pratyangira yantra.

Pratyangira is depicted with the head of a male lion and the body of a woman. In paintings and sculptures, she is typically characterised by a dark complexion, a lion's face, reddened eyes, disheveled hair, and a protruding tongue. She is shown riding a lion vāhana (mount) and wearing a garland of skulls.

Her iconography primarily exists in two distinct forms: a commonly depicted four-armed form and a multi-headed, multi-armed cosmic manifestation called Maha Pratyangira. In the four-armed form, she is seated on her lion mount holding a trishula (trident), a pasha (serpent noose), a damaru (hand drum), and a kapala (skull cup). The Maha Pratyangira form expands this imagery to feature multiple lion faces and numerous hands holding various weapons. Her ugra (fierce) appearance is believed to serve as a protective visual form for her adherents.

== Worship ==
Pratyangira is worshipped across various traditions such as Hinduism, Buddhism, and Jainism. Her sadhana (spiritual practice) is performed by adherents for the purpose of counteracting evil rites and magic, obtaining welfare, and destroying suffering.

A number of temples are dedicated to the goddess, primarily in South India:

- Prathyangira Devi Temple, Shollinganallur
- Maa Pratyangira Kalika Alayam
- Prathyangira Devi Temple, Ayyavadi

== See also ==
- Matrikas
- Varahi
- Brahmani

== Reference ==
=== Bibliography ===
- Sankar, Sanjay (2024). "A Cross-Cultural Study on the Mythology and Iconography of Goddess Pratyangira". Heritage: Journal of Multidisciplinary Studies in Archaeology. 11 (2). University of Kerala: 206–237.
- Rao, T.B. Lakshmana (2017). Śrī Tripurārahasyam (Māhātmya Khaṇḍam) - Sanskrit Text With English Translation. p. 577.
- Kumar, Benoy (1972). The Folk-Element In Hindu Culture: A Contribution To Socio-Religious Studies In Hindu Folk-Institutions. Munshiram Manoharlal Publishers Pvt. Limited. ISBN 978-81-7069-025-2.
