= Tirthas of Rameswaram =

There are sixty-four Tīrthas (holy water bodies) in and around the island of Rameswaram, Tamil Nadu, India. According to Skānda Purāṇa, twenty-four of them are important. Bathing in these Tīrthas is a major aspect of the pilgrimage to Rameswaram and is considered equivalent to penance. Twenty-two of the Tīrthas are within the Rāmanāthasvāmī Temple.

== List of Tīrthas ==
Tīrthas	Location	Type	Notes
Cakra Tīrtham	Tirupullāni(Darbhaśayanam)	Large Pond	
Vetāla Varada Tīrtham	south of Chakra Tirtham of Tirupullani		
Pāpa Vināśa Tīrtham	Gandhamādhana		
Sītā Kuṇḍam	near Thangachimadam		Not accessible due to new habitation.
Maṅgala Tīrtham	near Ekānta Rāma Temple	Large Pond	
Amṛta Vāpī	near Ekānta Rāma Temple	Well	
Brahma Kuṇḍam			
Hanumān Kuṇḍam	North of Rāmanāthasvāmī Temple	Large Pond	
Agastya Tīrtham	North-east of Rāmanāthasvāmī Temple	Small Pond	
Lakṣmaṇa Tīrtham	West of Rāmanāthasvāmī Temple beside the highway	Large Pond	
Jaṭā Tīrtham	On the way to Dhanushkodi	Large Pond	
Lakṣmī Tīrtham	Inside Rāmanāthasvāmī Temple	Well	
Agni Tīrtham	Beach east of Rāmanāthasvāmī Temple	Sea	
Cakra Tīrtham of Ramanathaswamy Temple	Inside Rāmanāthasvāmī Temple	Well	
Śiva Tīrtham	Inside Rāmanāthasvāmī Temple	Well	
Śaṅkha Tīrtham	Inside Rāmanāthasvāmī Temple	Well	
Yamunā Tīrtham	Inside Rāmanāthasvāmī Temple	Well	
Gaṅgā Tīrtham	Inside Rāmanāthasvāmī Temple	Well	
Gayā Tīrtham	Inside Rāmanāthasvāmī Temple	Well	
Koṭi Tīrtham	Inside Rāmanāthasvāmī Temple	Well	
Sātyāmṛta Tīrtham	Inside Rāmanāthasvāmī Temple	Well	
Amutha Tīrtham			
Dhanuṣkoṭī Tīrtham	Dhanushkodi	Sea	
Nāga Tīrtham	North-east of Rāmanāthasvāmī Temple	Small Pond	
Nakula Tīrtham	On the way to Gandhamadana	Small Pond	
Sahadeva Tīrtham	On the way to Gandhamadana	Small Pond	
Draupadī Tīrtham	On the way to Gandhamadana	Small Pond	
Bhīma Tīrtham	On the way to Gandhamadana	Small Pond	
Arjuna Tīrtham	On the way to Gandhamadana	Small Pond	
Jāmbavān Tīrtham		Well	
Aṅgada Tīrtham		Well	
Sugrīva Tīrtham	On the way to Gandhamadana	Large Pond	
Rāma Tīrtham	West of Rāmanāthasvāmī Temple beside the highway	Large Pond	
Sītā Tīrtham	West of Rāmanāthasvāmī Temple beside the highway	Small Pond	
Ṛṇa Vimocana Tīrtham	near Ekaanta Rama Temple	Large Pond	
Villuṇḍi Tīrtham	near Thangachimadam	Well	In the middle of the ocean, a few metres away from the beach
Kapi Tīrtham	Paamban		
Bhairava Tīrtham			
Amṛta Tīrtham	On the way to Gandhamadana		
Dharma Tīrtham			
Gandhamādana Tīrtham			
Pancha Pāṇḍava Tīrtham	near Ekaanta Rama Temple		
Vāli Tīrtham			
Gaja Tīrtham			
Kumuda Tīrtham			
Śāradā Tīrtham			
Paraśurāma Tīrtham			
Sarva Tīrtham	Inside Rāmanāthasvāmī Temple	Well	
Candra Tīrtham	Inside Rāmanāthasvāmī Temple	Well	
Sūrya Tīrtham	Inside Rāmanāthasvāmī Temple	Well	
Brahma-hatti Vimocana Tīrtham	Inside Rāmanāthasvāmī Temple	Well	
Mādhava Tīrtham	Inside Rāmanāthasvāmī Temple	Well	
Nala Tīrtham	Inside Rāmanāthasvāmī Temple	Well	
Nīla Tīrtham	Inside Rāmanāthasvāmī Temple	Well	
Gavaya Tīrtham	Inside Rāmanāthasvāmī Temple	Well	
Gavākṣa Tīrtham	Inside Rāmanāthasvāmī Temple	Well	
Gandhamādana Tīrtham	Inside Rāmanāthasvāmī Temple	Well	
Sāvitrī Tīrtham	Inside Rāmanāthasvāmī Temple	Well	
Sarasvatī Tīrtham	Inside Rāmanāthasvāmī Temple	Well	
Gāyatrī Tīrtham	Inside Rāmanāthasvāmī Temple	Well	
