= Agni Tirtham =

Hindu pilgrimage site in Tamil Nadu, India

Coordinates: 9.288498°N 79.320731°E

Agni Tirtham is one of the Tirthas of Rameswaram, Tamil Nadu, India. The beach east of Ramanathaswamy Temple is known by this name. This Tirtham is one of the most visited Tirthams of Rameswaram for a holy bath.

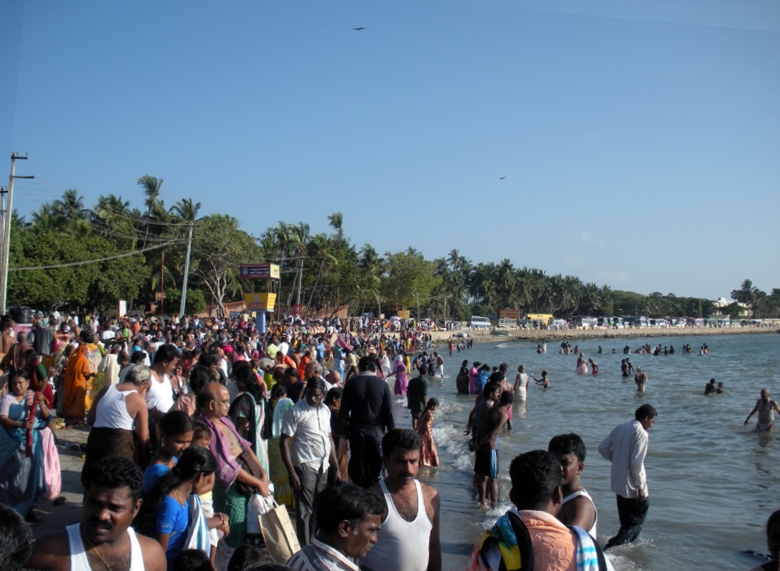
Agni Tirtham

== Faith & Beliefs ==
The faith among pilgrims is that child-less couples bathing in this Tirtham and offering prayers to Lord Shiva at the temple would be blessed with children.

New moon days and Full moon days are considered to be the most auspicious bathing days here.

== References in Literature ==
References to this Tirtha is made in Sethu Puranam, Skanda Puranam, Narada Puranam.

== See also ==
- Tirthas
- Rameswaram
- Tirthas of Rameswaram
- Ramanathaswamy Temple, Rameswaram
