= Prathyangira Devi Temple, Shollinganallur =

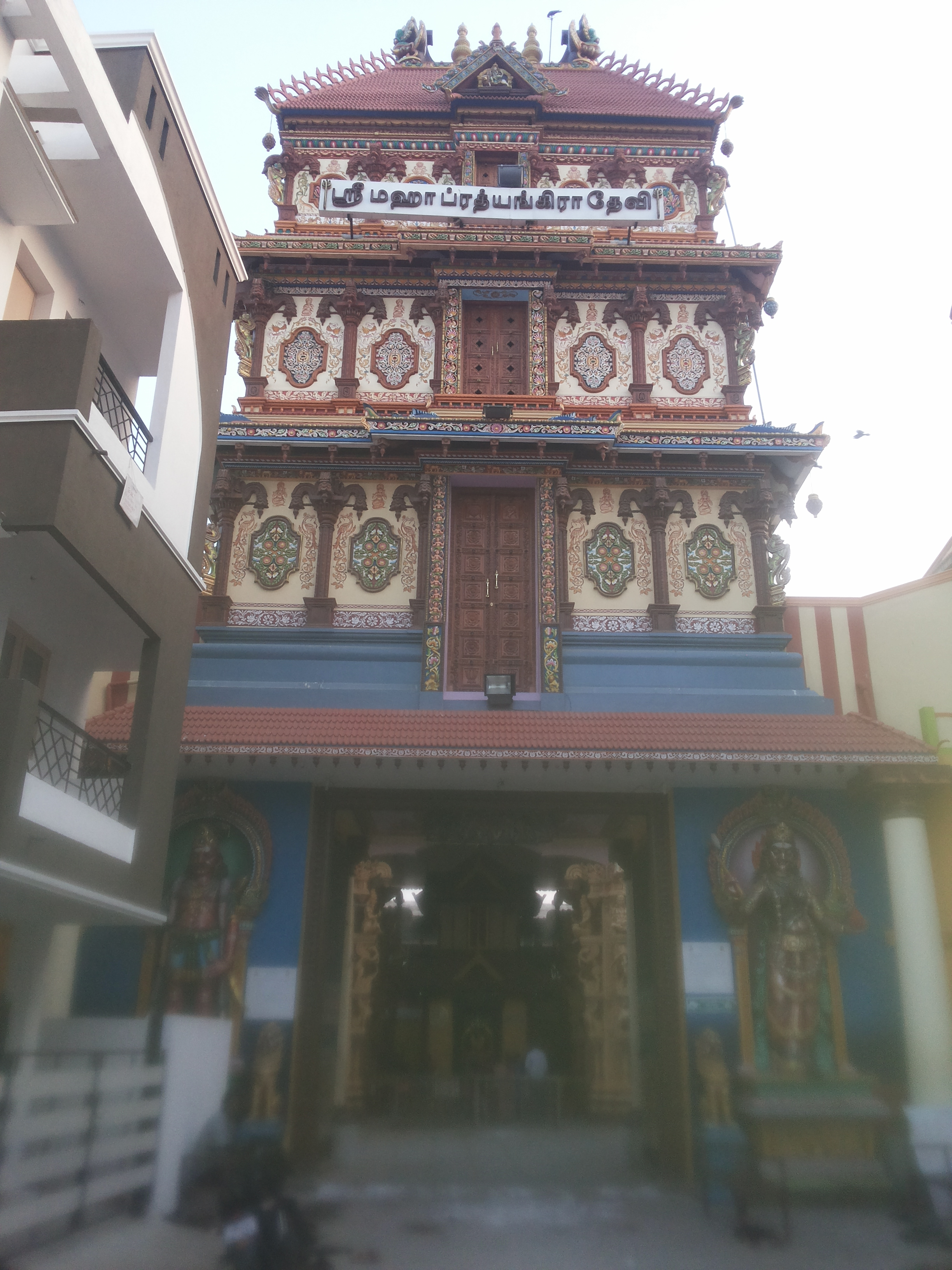
- Front view of the temple

Religion
- Affiliation: Hinduism
- District: Chennai
- Deity: Prathyangira (Maha Prathyangira Devi)

Location
- Location: Sholinganallur
- State: Tamil Nadu
- Country: India
- Interactive map of Prathyangira Devi Temple, Shollinganallur

Sri Maha Prathyangira Devi Temple is a Hindu temple located in the area of Sholinganallur, Chennai, India, adjacent to the beach of Bay of Bengal. The temple sits on the banks of the Buckingham Canal. The temple is dedicated to the goddess Prathyangira, in her form as Maha Prathyangira Devi. She is considered to be a powerful repellent of the influences generated by witchcraft, and is said to have the power to punish Adharma. This is one of the few temples of Prathyangira and the only temple for Shri Maha Prathyangira Devi, the Shanta form.

== The Temple ==
The other deities enshrined in the temple are the goddess Varahi, Goddess Neela Saraswathi, Narasimha, Ganesha, Muruga, Panjamukha Anjaneya, Agni, Kaalikaambal, Ayyappan, Saniswara, Sharabha, Rahu and Ketu, Guruvayoorappan and Shiva in the form of Aishwarya Eshwarar.

Timing: 8 am - 12 pm and 4 pm - 7:45 pm on weekdays, Sunday from 8 am - 1 pm and 4 pm to 8:30 pm (Only on Ammavasai).

== Poojas offered ==
Abishegam and Archana are a regulation here. Special poojas are offered every Sundays.

== Homas performed in the temple ==
Homas or yagnas are performed in the temple on special occasions only and it is conducted for free and any-one can participate, there is no agent or pre-booking for homam in this temple within India or in any other countries but there are scammers who pretend as agent for homams but they are no way related to this temple, homam are performed for public welfare and it is free to all.

== Location ==
The temple is located close to the junction and halfway down the link road of East Coast Road and Old Mahabalipuram Road.
