= Sharabha Upanishad =

Sanskrit text, part of Atharvaveda

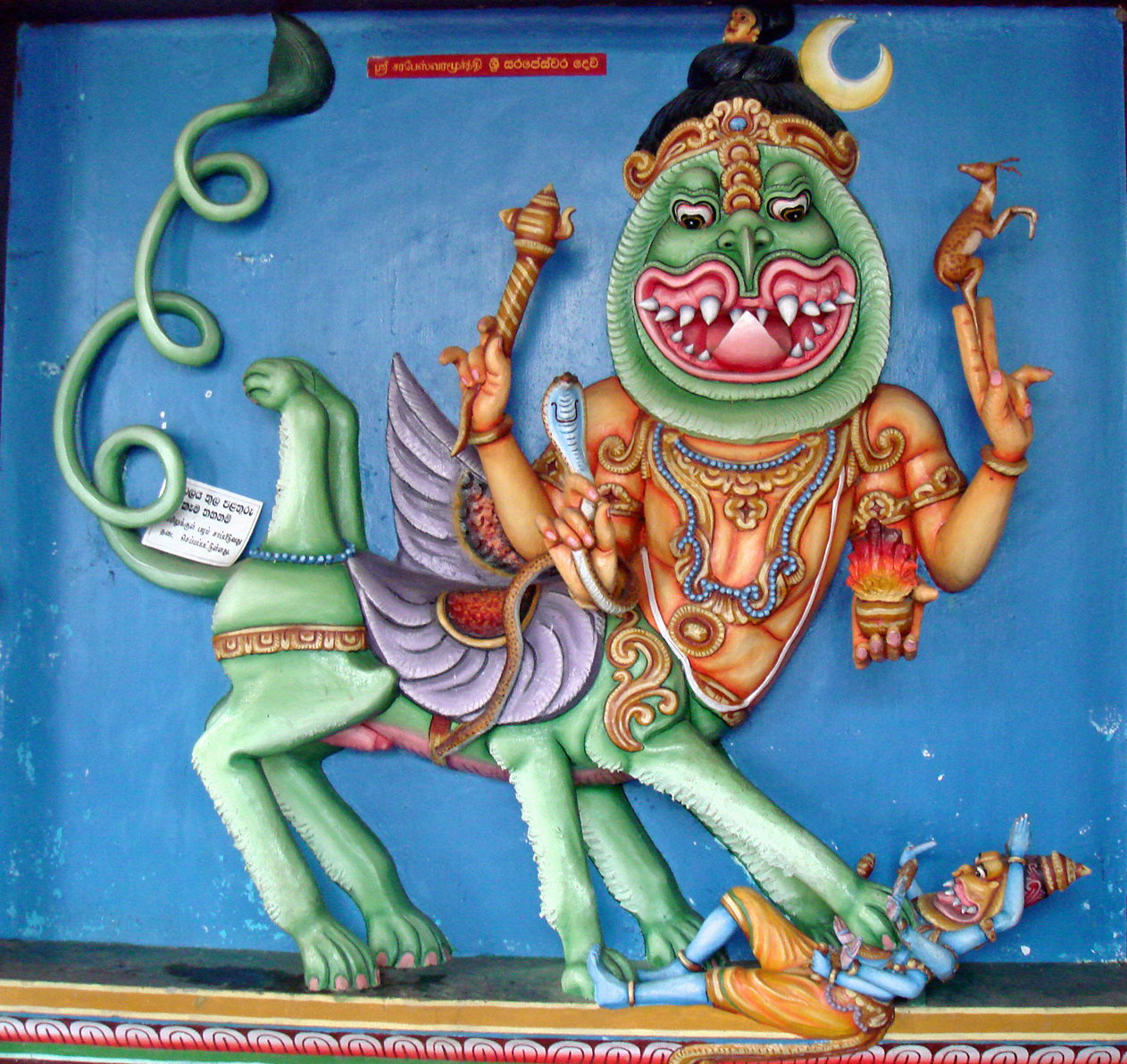
- The Sharabha Upanishad describes Sharabha
- Devanagari: शरभ
- Title means: The Upanishad of Sharabha
- Author(s): Pippalada
- Type: Shaiva
- Linked Veda: Atharvaveda
- Chapters: 1
- Verses: 35 plus prologue and epilogue

The Sharabha Upanishad (Sanskrit: शरभ उपनिषत्, IAST: Sharabha Upaniṣad) is a minor Upanishads of the Atharva Veda. In a Telugu language anthology of 108 Upanishads of the Muktika in the modern era, narrated by Rama to Hanuman, it is listed at serial number 50. It is one of the 14 Shaiva Upanishads.

The Upanishad eulogizes Shiva as the lord of the world who incarnates as Sharabha – a human-lion-bird version.

The text is also called as the "Pippaladadharmasastra," as an exposition of the knowledge by Brahma to sage Pippalada. Its title is also spelled as Sarabha Upanishad or Sharabhopanishad.

== Contents ==
The Upanishad, after an initial prayer offering to Indra, Garuda, and Brihaspati seeking prosperity and peace to all, extols Shiva or Maheshvara, in the first two verses as the original God, the creator of Brahma, Vishnu, and other divinities, as the being who governs the world, as the chief architect of the Vedas that was conveyed to Brahma, who destroyed the universe at the great flood, and as the Lord of Lords.

In the third verse of the Upanishad, the narration is of Shiva incarnating as Sharabha, a fierce anthropomorphic being combining the aspects of eagle, lion, and man. Sharabha subdues Narasimha, an incarnation of Vishnu, to prevent him from wreaking havoc to creation, thus restoring the deity to his original four armed form. According to the Puranas, Sharabha was one of Shiva's sixty-four avatars (forms), assumed to assist the devas and human beings.

In the fourth verse, the Upanishad states that after killing Narasimha with his claws, Sharabha wore his hide as his attire and came to be called Virabhadra. In the fifth verse, Sharabha is described to decapitate the fifth head of Brahma. In the sixth verse, he slays Kala (time), the god of death, with his feet. He consumes halahala, the poison that was produced along with amrita (nectar of immortality) from the cosmic ocean in the episode of the churning of the ocean.

In the seventh verse, Shiva, pleased with the veneration of Vishnu, gifts him with the Sudarshana Chakra (a divine discus), commonly featured in Vaishnava Iconography. In the last three verses, the Upanishad assures the efficacy of Shiva to burn all sins away if they are caused and perpetuated by others.

The one, who has crossed sorrows, sees that God, who is atom within an atom, gross among the gross, who as Atman hidden in the heart of beings and who is beyond physical action, clearly because of these reasons. Salutations to that Rudra who is the greatest god, who holds the shula (trident) in his hand, who has a big swallowing mouth, who is the Maheshvara and whose blessing has good effects.

— Sharabha Upanishad 7–8,

The narration of the Upanishad, states the text, offers moksha, or spiritual liberation.

== Bibliography ==
- Camājam, Cen̲n̲ai Caiva Cittānta Makā; Perumanram, Saiva Siddhanta (1979). Saiva Siddhanta. Saiva Siddhanta Mahasamajam.
- Desai, S. G. (1996). A critical study of the later Upanishads. Bharatiya Vidya Bhavan. ISBN 9788172760779.
- Deussen, Paul; Bedekar, V.M.; Palsule, G.B. (1 January 1997). Sixty Upanishads of the Veda. Motilal Banarsidass. ISBN 978-81-208-1467-7.
- Nair, Shantha N. (1 January 2008). Echoes of Ancient Indian Wisdom. Pustak Mahal. ISBN 978-81-223-1020-7.
