= Ramanathaswamy Temple =

Hindu temple in Rameswaram island in the state of Tamil Nadu, India

- Arulmigu Sri Ramanathaswamy Tirukkoyil
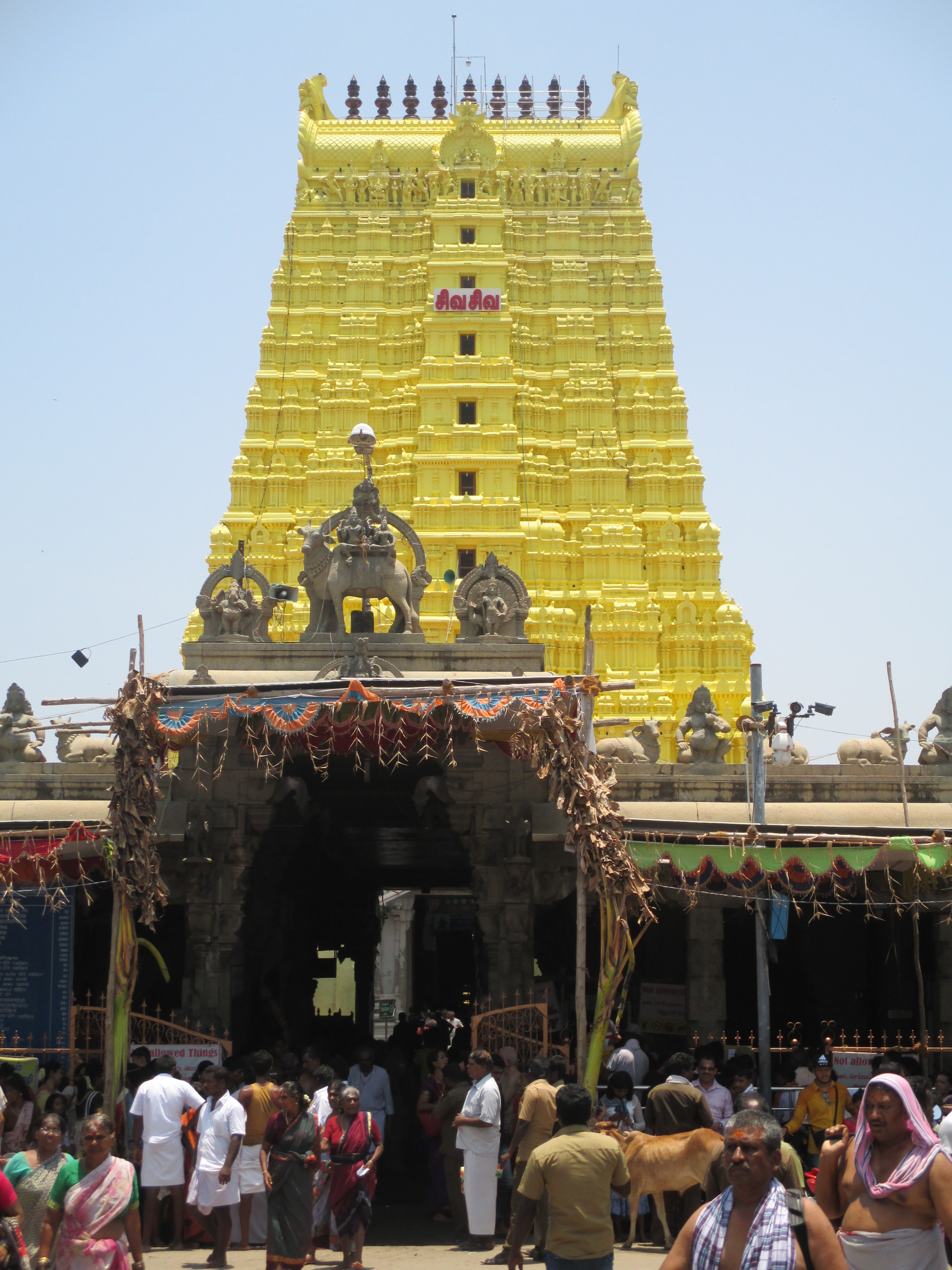

- Location in Tamil Nadu

Religion
- Affiliation: Hinduism
- District: Ramanathapuram
- Deity: Ramanathaswamy (Shiva) Parvatavardhini (Parvati); Rama

Location
- Location: Rameswaram
- State: Tamil Nadu
- Country: India
- Coordinates: 9.288106°N 79.317282°E

Architecture
- Type: Tamil architecture
- Creator: Pandya and Jaffna kings

Website
- https://rameswaramramanathar.hrce.tn.gov.in/hrcehome/index_temple.php?tid=35671

Char Dham

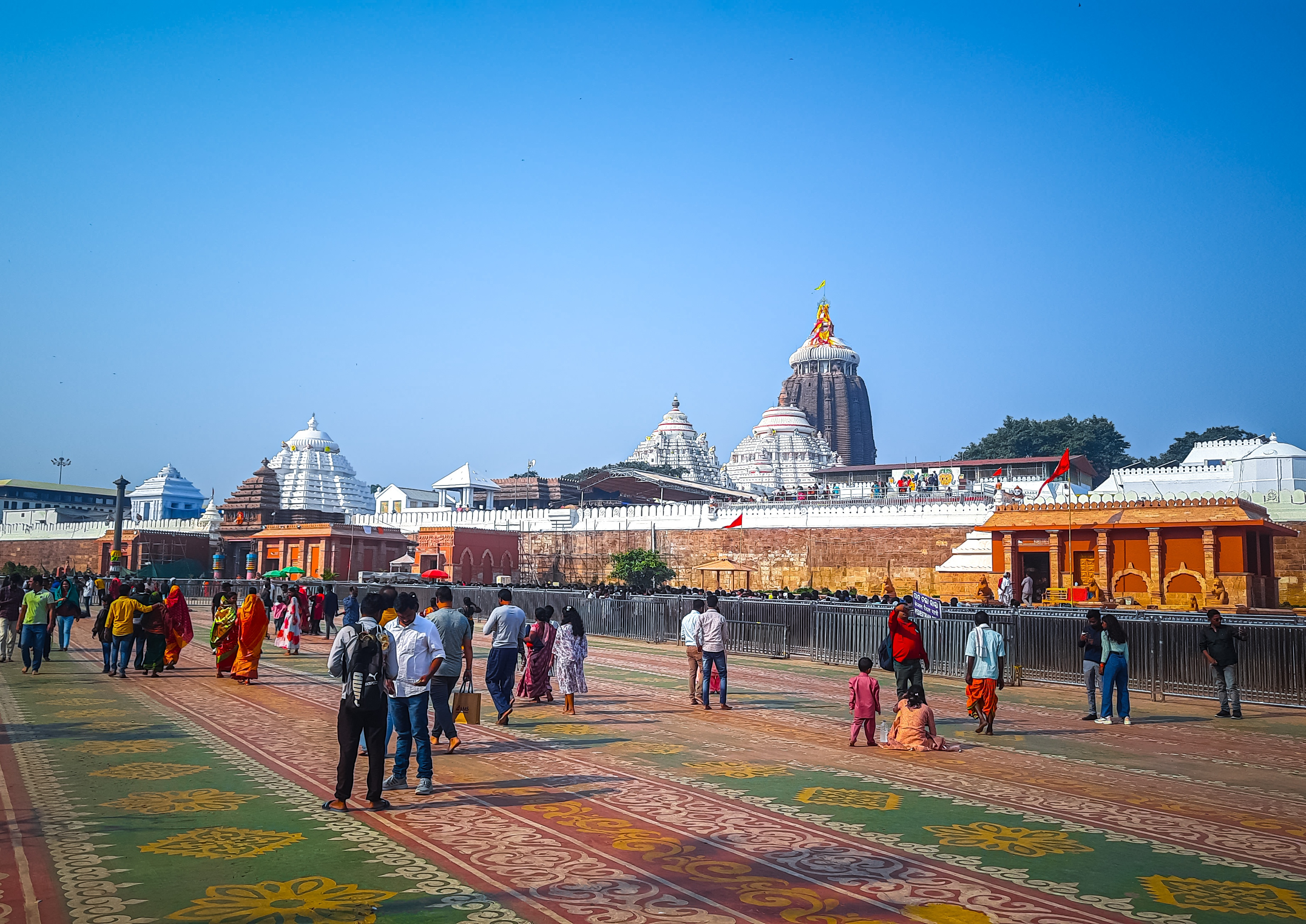
Jagannath Puri

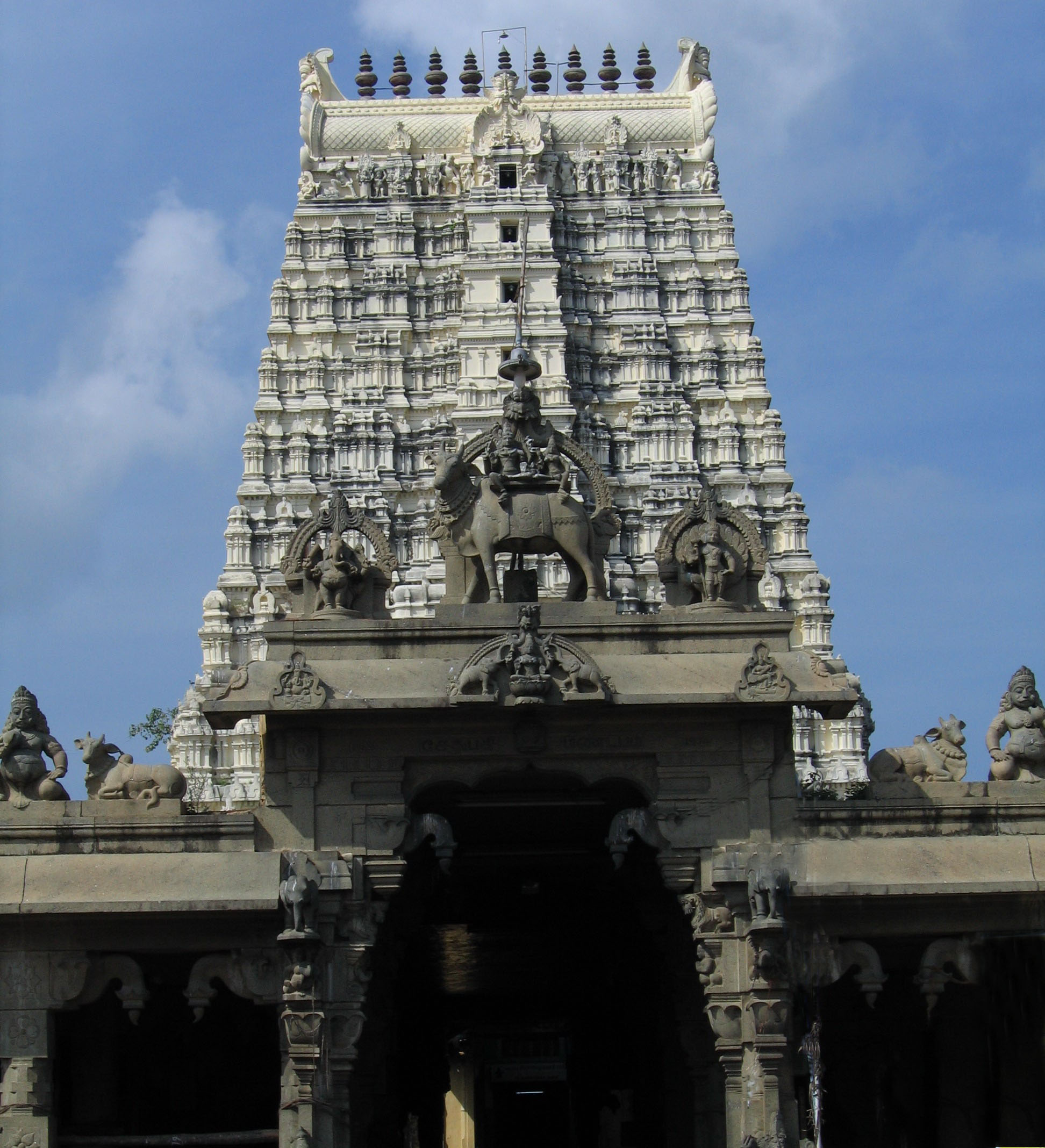
Rameswaram

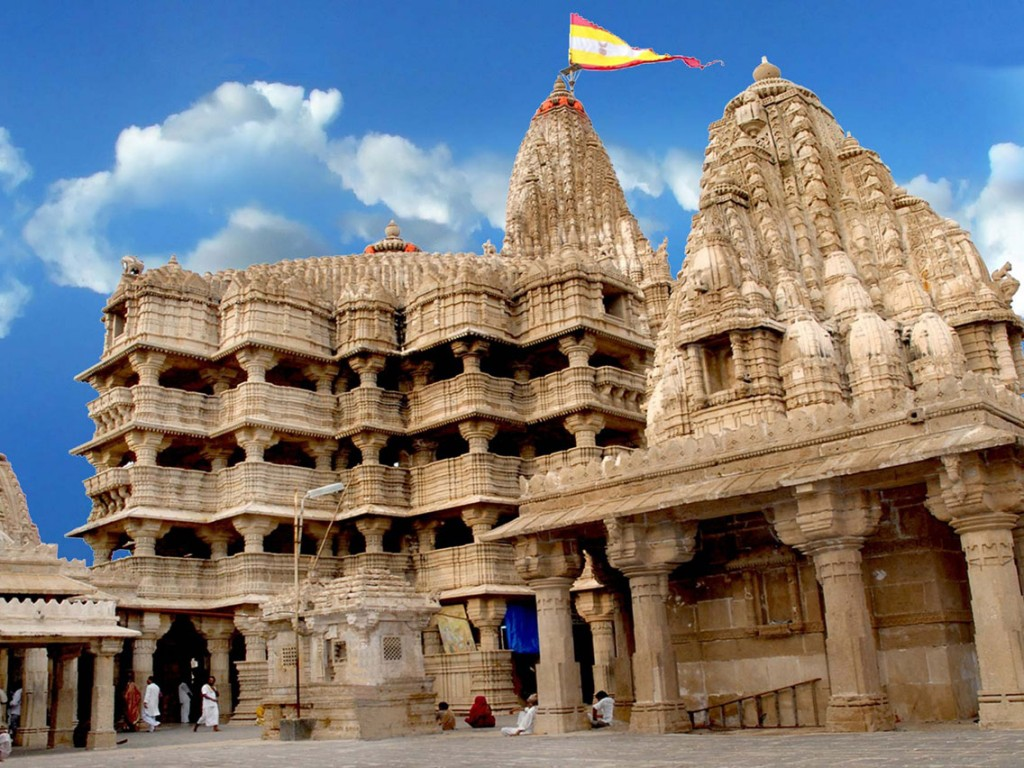
Dwarka

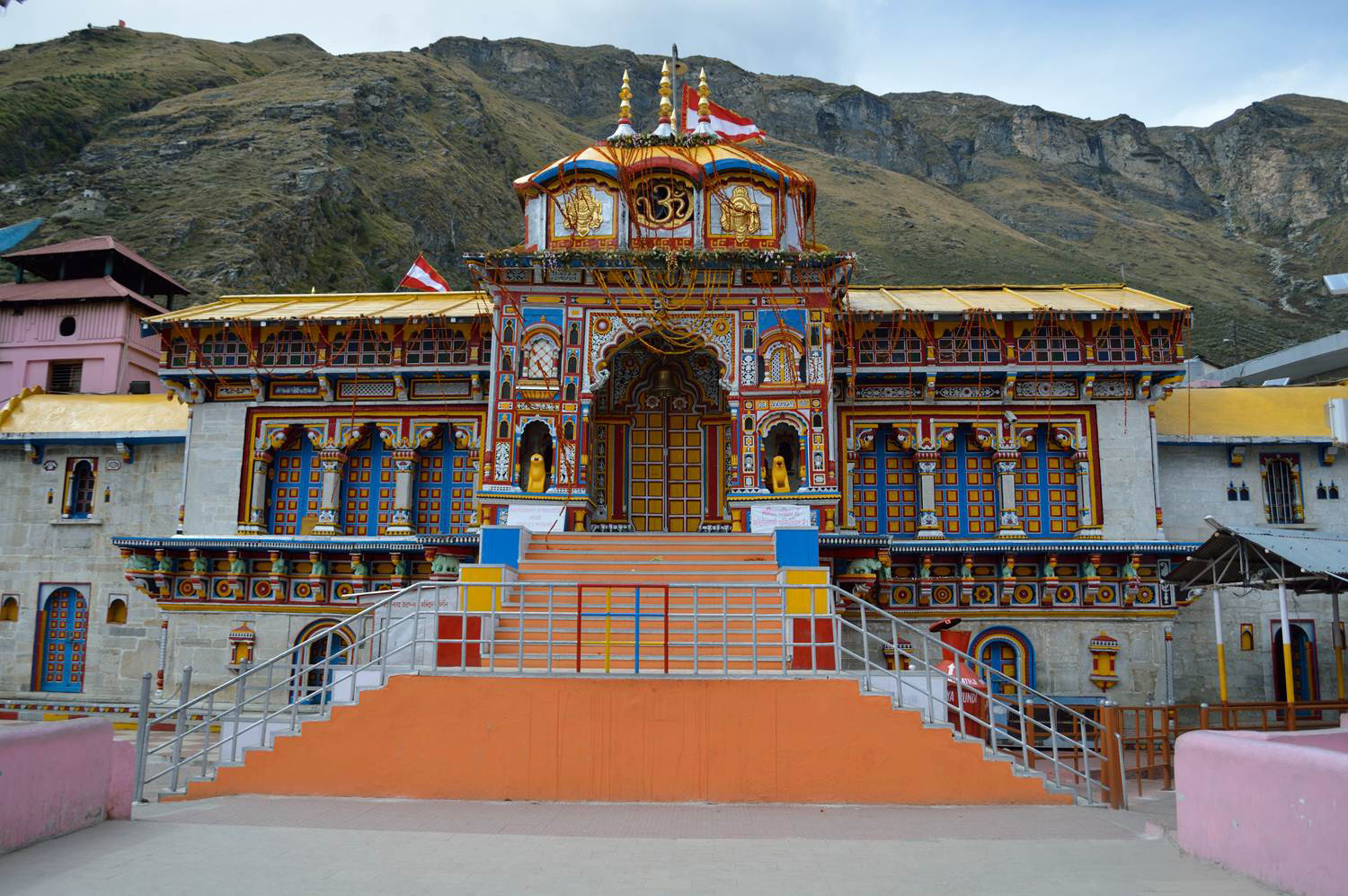
Badrinath

Ramanathaswamy Temple (Rāmanātasvāmi Kōyil) is a Hindu temple dedicated to the Hindu god Shiva located on Rameswaram island in the state of Tamil Nadu, India. It is one of the twelve Jyotirlinga temples. It is one of the 276 Paadal Petra Sthalams, the sacred sites glorified by the Nayanars (Shaivite poet-saints), Appar, Sundarar, and Sambandar, with their songs. According to tradition, the lingam (an aniconic form of Shiva) of the Ramanathaswamy Temple was established and worshipped by Rama before he crossed the bridge called Rama Setu to the island kingdom of Lanka, identified with Sri Lanka. It is one of the Char Dham pilgrimage sites. The temple was expanded during the 12th century by the Pandya Dynasty, and its principal shrine’s sanctum was renovated by Jeyaveera Cinkaiariyan and his successor Gunaveera Cinkaiariyan, monarchs of the Jaffna kingdom. The temple has the longest corridor among all the Hindu temples of India. It was built by King Muthuramalinga Sethupathy. The temple is considered a pilgrimage site for Shaivites, Vaishnavites, and Smartas.

== Legend ==
In the Yuddha Kanda of the Ramayana, on their journey back to Ayodhya, Rama narrates to Sita the appearance and worship of Shiva in the form of a lingam on the island of Rameswaram before the construction of his bridge to Lanka. He describes the spot to be supremely sacred and capable of expiating major sins.

In the Shiva Purana, Rama propitiates Shiva on the shore of Rameswaram in the form of a lingam by the repetition of mantras, meditation, and dancing. Pleased, the deity appeared before Rama and granted his requested boon of victory over Ravana. Rama then requested the deity to remain on the island to sanctify the world and offer his grace to all people. The text states that the worship of the Rameshvara lingam offers worldly pleasures and salvation for its devotees.

== History ==
According to Firishta, Malik Kafur, the head general of Alauddin Khalji, the ruler of Delhi Sultanate, reached Rameswaram during his political campaign in spite of stiff resistance from the Pandyan princes in the early 14th century. He erected a mosque by name Alia al-Din Khaldji in honour of victory of Islam. The records left by the court historians of the Delhi Sultanate state that Malik Kafur raided Madurai, Chidambaram, Srirangam, Vriddhachalam, Rameswaram and other sacred temple towns, destroyed the temples which were sources of gold and jewels. He brought back enormous loot from Dwarasamudra and the Pandya kingdom to Delhi in 1311.

The temple in its current form is believed to have been built during the 17th century, while Fergusson believes the small vimana in the west corridor belongs to the 11th or 12th century. The temple is said to have been sanctioned for construction by King Kizhavan Sethupathi or Raghunatha Kilavan. The contribution of the Jaffna kings of Pandya Dynasty to the temple was considerable. King Jeyaveera Cinkaiariyan (1380–1410 CE) shipped stone blocks from Koneswaram temple, Trincomalee to renovate the temple's sanctum sanctorum. Jeyaveera Cinkaiariyan's successor Gunaveera Cinkaiariyan (Pararacacekaran V), a trustee at Rameswaram who also oversaw structural development of this temple and the promotion of Saivite beliefs donated part of his revenue to Koneswaram. Especially to be remembered are the immense sums that were spent during the tenure of Pradani Muthirulappa Pillai towards the restoration of the Pagodas which were falling into ruins and the splendid Chockattan Mantapam or the cloistered precincts of the temple at Rameswaram that he finally completed. The rulers of Sri Lanka also contributed to the temple; Parakrama Bahu (1153–1186 CE) was involved in the construction of the sanctum sanctorum of the temple. Also, Sri Lankan king Nissanka Malla, contributed to the temple's development by making donations and sending workers.

Vijayanagaram empire administer the southern provinces. Madurai Nayaks ruled the Ramnad area with the appointed chieftains between 14th to 16th century CE, and in 17th century CE the appointed governors expanded their power to establish "Ramnad Kingdom". Madurai Nayak king Muthukrishnappa Nayak, the first recorded Sethupathi, Saidaikan who assumed the title Udaiyan Rakunatha Sethupathi was installed as ruler in 1606–1621.

The temple is one of the most famous pilgrimage sites and has several historical references about it. The Maratha kings who ruled Thanjavur established chatrams or rest houses throughout Mayiladuthurai and Rameswaram between 1745 and 1837 CE and donated them to the temple.

== Architecture ==
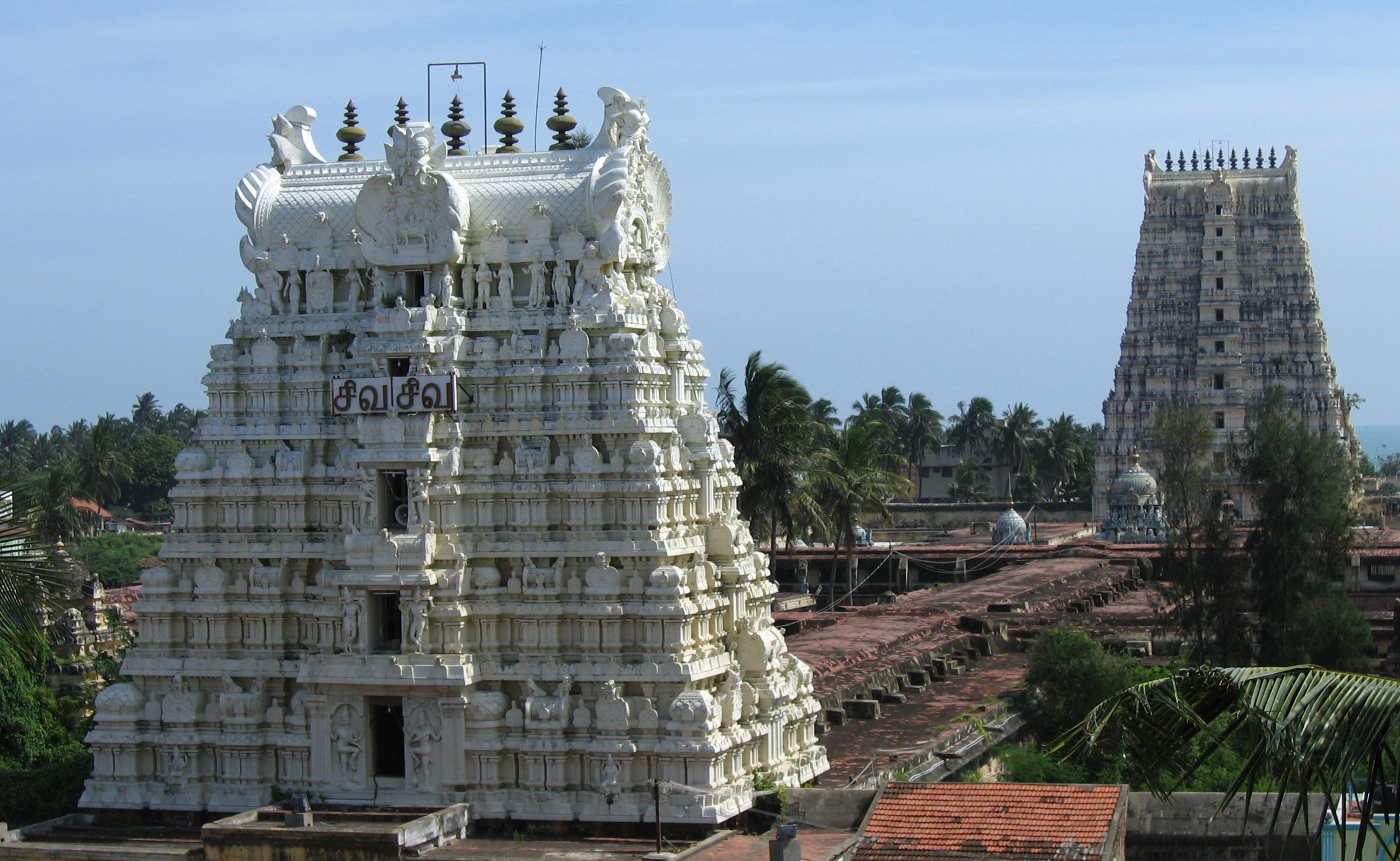
Image of the east and west temple towers

The primary deity of the temple is Ramanathaswamy (Shiva) in the form of lingam. There are two lingams inside the sanctum - According to tradition, one built by Rama from sand, residing as the main deity, called the Ramalingam, and the one brought by Hanuman from Kailash, called the Vishvalingam. Rama is said to have instructed that the Vishvalingam be worshipped first since it was brought by Hanuman—the tradition continues even today.

Like all ancient temples in South India, there is a high compound wall (madil) on all four sides of the temple premises measuring about 865 feet furlong from east to west and one furlong of 657 feet from north to south with huge towers (Gopurams) to the east and the west and finished gate towers to the north and south. The temple has striking long corridors in its interior, running between huge colonnades on platforms above five feet high.

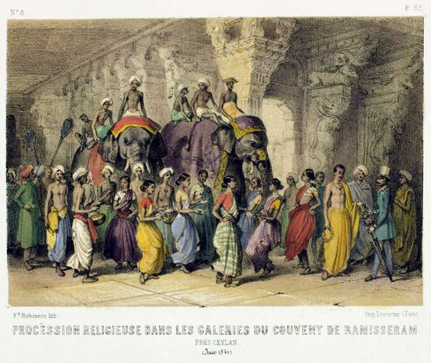
Historic image from 1841 of the temple corridor, as sketched by Prince Alexey Saltykov

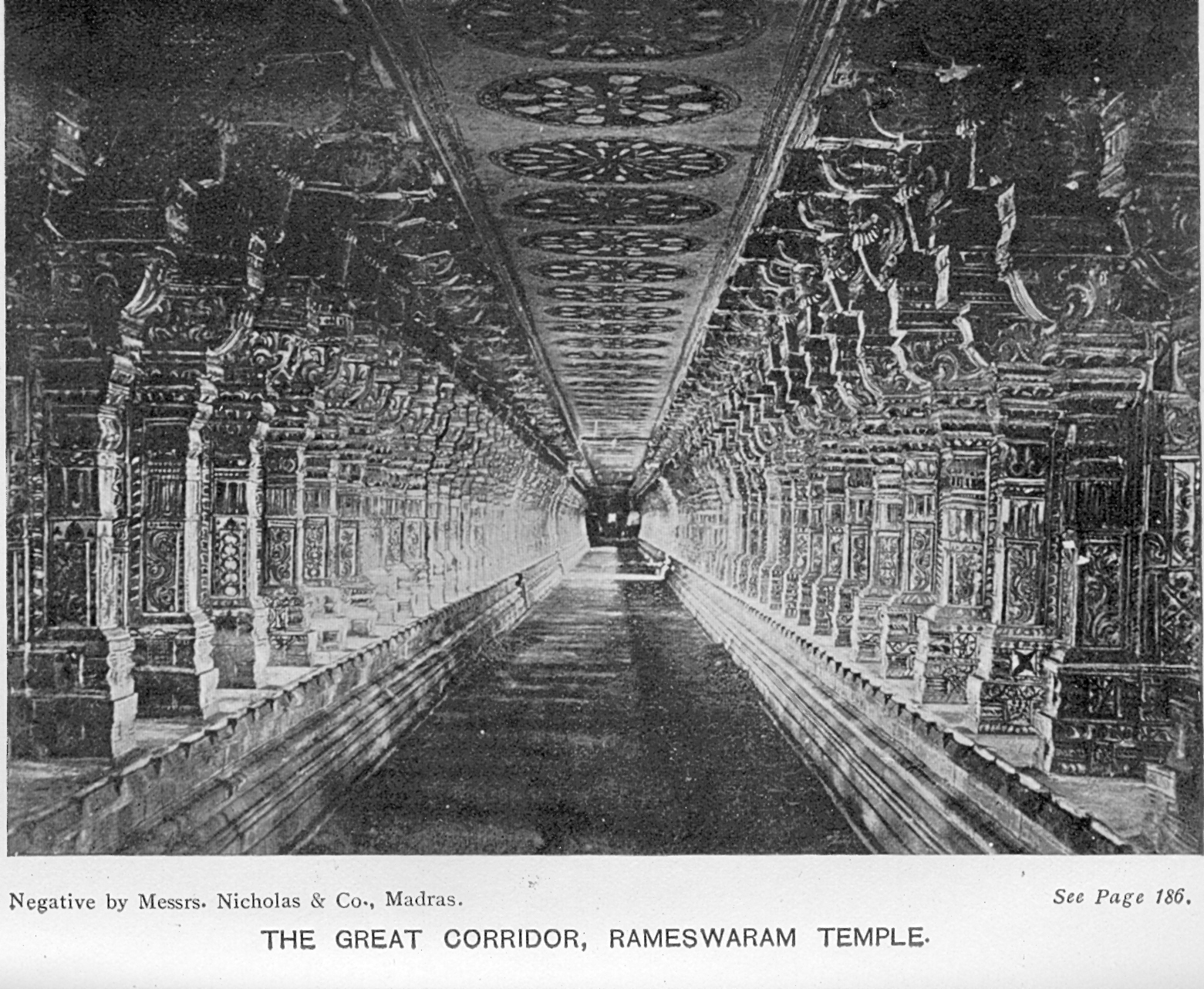
A historic image from 1913 of the temple corridor. The corridor is the longest for any Hindu temple in India

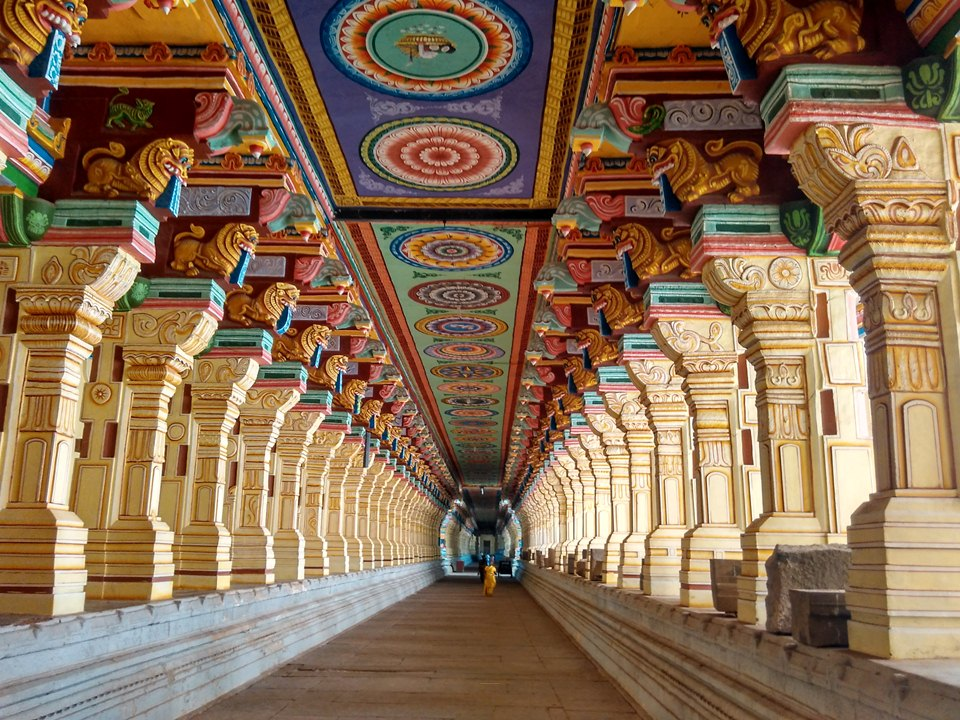
A modern image of the temple corridor

The second corridor is formed by sandstone pillars, beams, and ceiling. The junction of the third corridor on the west and the paved way leading from the western gopuram to the Setumadhava shrine forms a unique structure in the form of a chess board, popularly known as Chokkattan Madapam, where the Utsava deities are adorned and kept during the Vasanthotsavam (Spring festival) and on the 6th day festival in Adi (July–August) and Masi (February–March) conducted by the Sethupathi of Ramnad.

The outer set of corridors is reputed to be the longest in the world, measuring about 6.9 m in height, 400 feet each in the east and west and about 640 feet in the north and the south. The inner corridors are about 224 feet each in the east and the west and about 352 feet each in the north and the south. Their width varies from 15.5 feet to 17 feet in the east and west about 172 feet on the north and south with width varying 14.5 feet to 17 feet. The total length of these corridors is thus 3850 feet. There are about 1212 pillars in the outer corridor. Their height is about 30 feet from the floor to the center of the roof. The main tower or rajagopuram is 53 m tall. Most pillars are carved with individual compositions. At the beginning, Ramanathaswamy Temple was a thatched shed. The present structure was the work of many individuals spread over a number of centuries. The pride of place in the establishment of the Temple goes to the Setupatis of Ramanathapuram. In the seventeenth century, Dalavai Setupati built a portion of the main eastern Gopuram. In the late eighteenth century, the world-famous third corridor was constructed by Muthuramalinga Setupati who lived for forty-nine years and ruled between 1763 and 1795. The corridor was called "Chokkatan Mandapam". The Mukhya Pradhani (Chief Minister) was Muthuirullappa Pillai and the Chinna Pradhani (Deputy Chief Minister) was Krishna Iyengar. The Setupati's statue and those of his two Pradhanis (ministers) can be seen at the western entrance to the third corridor.

The composite columns of Virabhadra holding sword and horn are found be additions of the Vijayanagara kings during the early 1500s. Similar columns of Virabhadra are built by Madurai Nayak kings in Adikesava Perumal Temple at Thiruvattaru, Meenakshi Temple at Madurai, Nellaiappar Temple at Tirunelveli, Kasi Viswanathar temple at Tenkasi, Krishnapuram Venkatachalapathy temple, Soundararajaperumal temple at Thadikombu, Srivilliputhur Andal temple, Srivaikuntanathan Permual temple at Srivaikuntam, Avudayarkovil, Vaishnava Nambi and Thirukurungudivalli Nachiar temple at Thirukkurungudi.

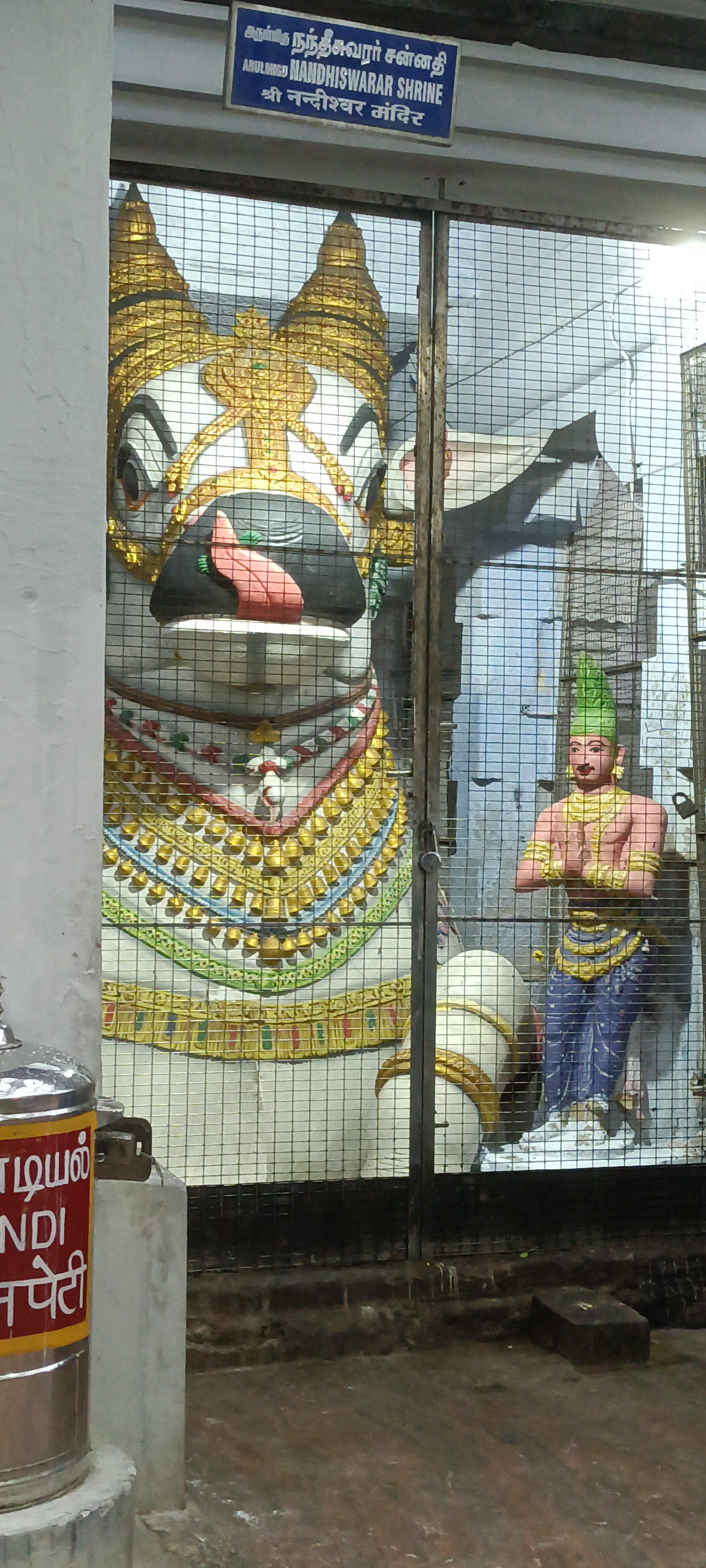
a shrine dedicated to Nandi (Nandishvara)

There are separate shrines for Ramanathaswamy and his consort goddess Parvathavardhini separated by a corridor. There are separate shrines for the goddess Vishalakshi, the utsava images, sayanagriha, Vishnu and Ganesha. The samadhi of the great Yogi Patanjali is said to be at this temple and there is a separate shrine for him here. There are various halls inside the temple, namely Anuppu Mandapam, Sukravara Mandapam, Setupati Mandapam, Kalyana Mandapam, and Nandi Mandapam.

=== Temple Tanks ===
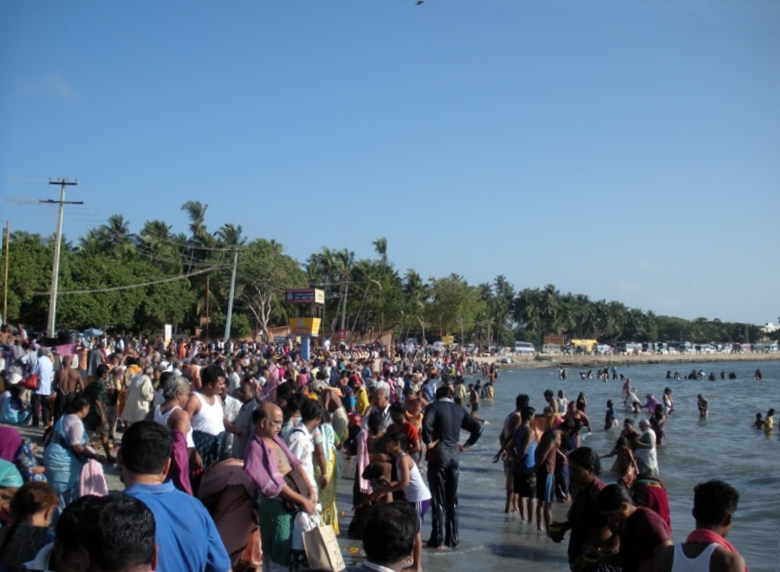
Agni Theertham - the primary sea shore associated with the temple

There are sixty-four Tīrthas (holy water bodies) in and around the island of Rameswaram, Tamil Nadu, India. According to Skānda Purāṇa, twenty-four of them are important. Bathing in these Tīrthas is a major aspect of the pilgrimage to Rameswaram and is considered equivalent to penance. Twenty-two of the Tīrthas are within the Rāmanāthasvāmī Temple. The number 22 indicates the 22 arrows in Rama's quiver. The first and major one is called Agni Theertham, the sea (Bay of Bengal).

Rameswaram is one of the few temples that has the distinction of being the stala, Murthy, Theertham. Ramanathaswamy Temple Theertham is very special. There are 22 theerthams in the form of a pond and a well. These 22 theerthams represent the 22 arrows of Sri Rama.

== Significance today ==
=== Char Dham ===
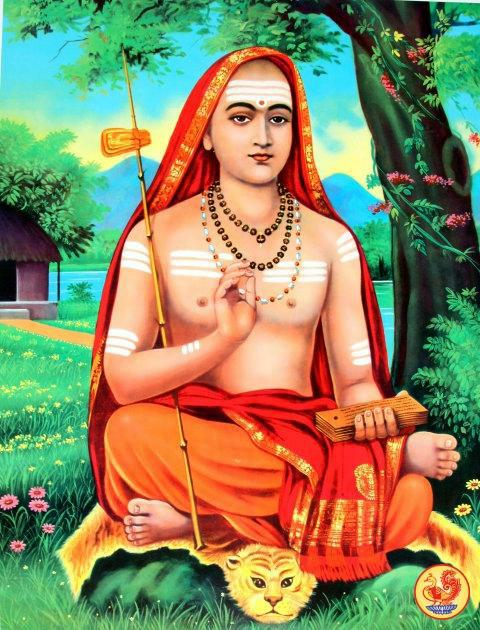
Adi Sankara, the guru of Advaita, who is believed to have started the Char Dhams

The temple is one of the holiest Hindu Char Dham (four divine sites) sites comprising Badrinath, Puri, Dwarka and Rameshwaram. Though the origins are not clearly known, the Advaita school of Hinduism established by Sankaracharya, who created Hindu monastic institutions across India, attributes the origin of Char Dham to the seer. The four monasteries lie across the four corners of India and their attendant temples are Badrinath Temple at Badrinath in the North, Jagannath Temple at Puri in the East, Dwarakadheesh Temple at Dwarka in the West and Ramanathaswamy Temple at Rameswaram in the South. The temples are revered by the various spiritual traditions of Hinduism, such as Saivism and Vaishnavism. The Char Dham pilgrimage is an all Hindu affair. The journey across the four cardinal points in India is considered sacred by Hindus who aspire to visit these temples once in their lifetime. Traditionally the trip starts at the eastern end from Puri, proceeding in clockwise direction in a manner typically followed for circumambulation in Hindu temples.

=== Jyotirlinga ===
As per the Shiva Purana, once, Brahma (the god of creation) and Vishnu (the god of preservation) had an argument in terms of their supremacy in creation. To settle their dispute, Shiva pierced the three worlds as a huge and endless pillar of light called the jyotirlinga. Vishnu and Brahma split their ways downwards and upwards respectively to find the end of the light in either directions. Brahma lied that he discovered the end of the pillar in his direction, while Vishnu conceded his defeat. Shiva cursed Brahma that he would have no place in ceremonies while Vishnu would be worshipped till the end of eternity. The jyotirlinga is regarded to be the supreme partless reality, out of which Shiva partly appears. The jyotirlinga shrines are believed to be the places where Shiva is said to have appeared as a fiery column of light. Originally, there were believed to have been 64 jyotirlingas, of which the present 12 are considered to be sacred to Shiva. Each of the twelve jyotirlinga sites take the name of the presiding deity - each considered a different manifestation of Shiva. At all these sites, the primary image is the lingam representing the stambha pillar, symbolising the infinite nature of Shiva (without beginning or end). The twelve jyotirlinga are Somnath at Veraval in Gujarat, Mallikarjuna at Srisailam in Andhra Pradesh, Mahakaleswar at Ujjain in Madhya Pradesh, Omkareshwar in Madhya Pradesh, Kedarnath in Himalayas, Bhimashankar in Maharashtra, Viswanath at Varanasi in Uttar Pradesh, Triambakeshwar in Maharashtra, Vaidyanath at Deoghar in Jharkhand, Nageswar at Dwarka in Gujarat, Rameshwar at Rameswaram in Tamil Nadu and Grishneshwar at Aurangabad, Maharashtra. This temple is the southernmost of all the twelve Jyotirlingas.

== In the news ==
The temple is maintained and administered by the Hindu Religious and Charitable Endowments Department of the Government of Tamil Nadu. The temple comes under the renovation and consecration of the 630 temples planned by the Hindu Religious and Charitable Endowments Department of the Government of Tamil Nadu. Temple authorities had planned to renovate and widen the pathways to the 22 holy theerthams of the temple. The consecration of the temple was planned during 2013. The temple is among those offering free meals under the Free Meals Scheme of the government, which provides meals to devotees of the temple. A pilgrim house is planned by the government to extend the scheme to more pilgrims.

== See also ==
- Tirthas of Rameswaram
- Dhanushkodi
