= Mount Gandhamadana =

Canonical religious location

Mount Gandhmadana (Note: Sanskrit: गन्धमादन, romanized: Gandhamādana) is a canonical mountain frequently mentioned in Hindu and Buddhist cosmology. Part of the Himalayas, it is renowned for its inaccessibility to mortals, its divine inhabitants, and its lush groves of medicinal plants and celestial flowers. In Sanskrit literature, the name is often interpreted as "intoxicating with fragrance." Mount Gandhamadana lacks verifiable geographic location in the modern world.

== Geography ==
Mount Gandhmadana is frequently identified in scholarly analysis as a mystic region of Puranic cosmology, often described as being "invisible to mortal eyes" and thus lacking verifiable geographic location in the modern world.

In the Puranic description of the universe, Mount Gandhmadana is located in the northern part of Jambudvīpa. It is one of the four pillar mountains surrounding Mount Meru, specifically situated to the south of the cosmic center. According to the Vishnu Purana, it stands approximately 10,000 yojanas high.

The mountain is associated with several other peaks and ranges in the divine geography of the north. It is often described as being in close proximity to or forming part of Gangdise Shan, a range that includes Mount Kailasa and Mount Mainaka. Gandhmadana also contains the sacred hermitage of Badarikashrama, the abode of the sages Nara and Narayana. The mountain is a source for several celestial rivers; the southern branch of the Ganges, known as the Alaknanda, flows near its reaches.

== Significance ==
=== Hinduism ===
Mount Gandhamadana is considered a "heaven on earth" and the resort of the righteous. It is inhabited by various mythical beings, including rakshasas, kimnaras, siddhas, apsarases, yakshas and gandharvas. The mountain is also the personal domain of Kubera, the god of wealth, who governs the locals yakshas and gandharvas. The sages Nara and Narayana are said to perform eternal austerities (tapas) at Badari on this mountain. The region is "invisible to mortal eyes" and can be approached by possessing great merit, yogic concentration, or ascetic rigor.

==== In the Mahabharata ====
The mountain plays a major role in several episodes of the Mahabharata. During their forest exile, the Pandavas ascend the mountain to await Arjuna's return from the heavens. The journey is depicted as gruelling; Draupadi faints during the ascent due to the wind, rain and physical exhaustion. Once while on the mountain, Bhima encounters a golden banana grove (kadalisanda) that conceals the road to the world of the gods. It is here that he has a famous philosophical meeting with his brother, the monkey-god Hanuman. Bhima also battles yakshas to retrieve the fragrant (saugandhika (Note: Saugandhika from Sanskrit meaning "very fragrant".)) lotuses (Nelumbo nucifera or Padma) for Draupadi.

In the epic's final books, Svargarohana Parva, the Pandavas return to the northern mountains for their Svargarohana (ascent to heaven). This final journey echoes their earlier visit to Gandhmadana, though this time the physical toll is fatal for all but Yudhisthira.

=== Buddhism ===
In Theravada Buddhism, Mount Gandhmadana is the traditional home of the Paccekabuddhas (Silent Buddhas). While these figures are often described as solitary, they are said to live in communities on the mountain's slopes. The "Land of the Paccekabuddhas" on Gandhamadana is viewed in some traditions as a precursor to the concept of a "Pure Land."

== Flora and nature ==
Mount Gandhmadana is celebrated for its extraordinary botanical diversity. It is known as the "mountain of plants," providing the medicinal herbs used by Hanuman to heal Rama's brother. On its summit stands a giant jambu (rose apple) tree, for which the continent Jambudvīpa is named. Its fruit is described as being a large as elephants; when they fall and burst, their juice forms the Jambunadi River, the mud of which turns into a special type of gold used by the divine beings. The mountain features several divine forests, including the Caitraratha and Gandhmadana forests. Ancient texts list numerous trees growing on the mountain, including ashoka (Saraca asoca), ashvattha (Ficus religiosa), bakula (Mimusops elengi), shala (Shorea robusta), kadamba (Neolamarckia cadamba), and devadaru (Cedrus deodara). It is also the site of the saugandhika lotus (Nelumbo nucifera or Padma) ponds guarded by yakshas.
