= Sharabha =

Part-lion and part-bird deity in Hinduism

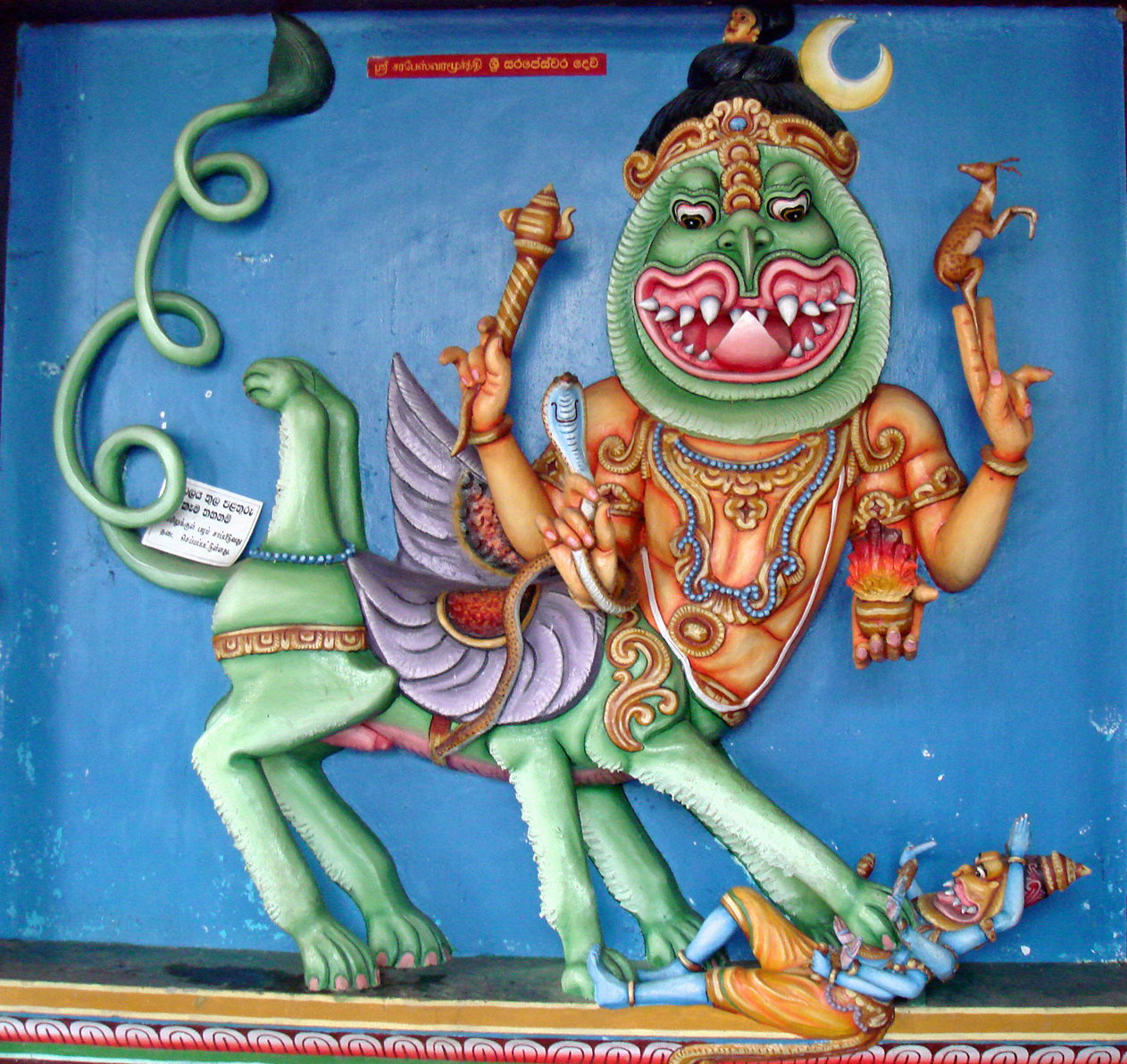
Shiva as Sharabha subduing Narasimha, panel view from Munneswaram temple in Sri Lanka

Sharabha (Sanskrit: शरभ, Śarabha) or Sarabha is an eight-legged part-lion and part-bird deity in Hindu religion, who is described as more powerful than a lion or an elephant, possessing the ability to clear a valley in one jump in Sanskrit literature. In later literature, Sharabha is described as an eight-legged deer.

The Shaiva scriptures narrate that the deity Shiva assumed the form of Sharabha to pacify Narasimha - the fierce man-lion avatar of Vishnu worshipped by the Vaishnava sect. This form is popularly known as Sharabheshvara ("Lord Sharabha") or Sharabheshvaramurti.

Vaishnavas try to refute the portrayal of Narasimha as being destroyed by Sharabha Shiva, and regard Sharabha as a name of Vishnu. Some Vaishnava states that Vishnu assumed the form of the ferocious two-headed bird Gandabherunda, who in turn defeated Sharabha.

In Buddhism, Sharabha appears in Jataka Tales as an earlier birth of the Buddha. It also appears in Tibetan Buddhist art, symbolizing the perfection of effort. As a figure of power and majesty, Sharabha has appeared in numerous emblems.

== Development and iconography ==
In early Sanskrit literature, Sharabha is initially described as an aggressive beast that roared and scared other animals in the hills and forest areas. In the later Hindu epic Mahabharata, Sharabha was described as a lion-slaying being with eight legs, eyes on the top; living in the forest and which ate raw flesh. It is also mentioned as residing on Mount Krauncha but not as a monster. In another account, Sharabha is an ordinary beast residing along with lions and tigers on Mount Gandhamadana. The epic also includes Sharabha in the list of edible animals - the mrigajatis- the animal group of antelope, deer, hare, bear, ruru deer, sambar, gayal, boar, and buffalo - which was offered as part of food at dinner to guests. Sharabha appears primarily as the incarnation of the god Shiva, as a name of a monkey-king in the epic Ramayana, also as a proper name of heroes and serpent Nāgas and one of the names of god Vishnu as well as the Buddha. Similies in Sanskrit literature compare warriors to Sharabha. In defining the ecological theme in Hindu medicine related to jungle and the aroma of meats, Sharabha has also been listed among the deer natives of Kashmir in Dalhana's 12th century commentary on the Sushruta Samhita. However, the features explained are of an eight legged animal of the size of a camel with huge horns and conjectured as a large Himalayan goat.

=== Shiva's incarnation ===
In Puranic literature, Sharabha is associated with the god Shiva and incarnates to subdue fierce manifestations of Vishnu. The legend of Sharabha fighting Narasimha - the man-lion form of Vishnu - brings to fore the overt rivalry between the devotees of Vishnu (Vaishnava sect) and those of Shiva (Shaiva sect), which exposes the fierce debate aspect. The Shiva Purana describes Sharabha as lion-faced, with matted hair, wings and eight feet, and a thousand arms. The Sharabha Upanishad portrays Sharabha with two heads, two wings, eight legs of the lion with sharp claws and a long tail. The Kalika Purana describes Sharabha as black in colour, with four feet downwards and four feet uplifted, with an enormous body. It also has a long face and nose, nails, eight legs, eight tusks, a cluster of manes, and a long tail. It jumps high repeatedly making a loud cry.

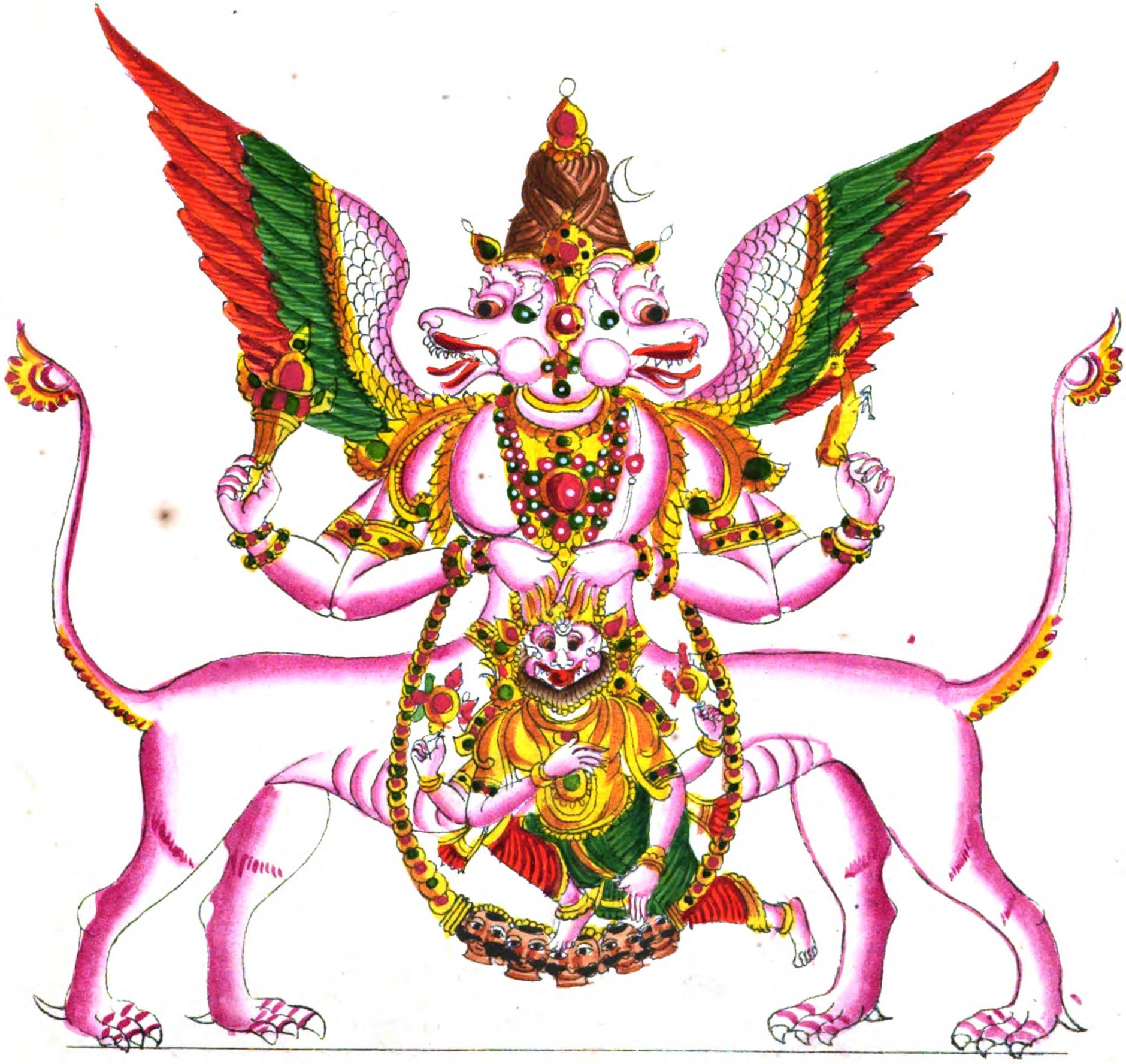
Two-headed Sharabha with four legs

The iconography of Sharabheshvaramurti (Shiva as Sharabha) is specifically defined in texts such as Kamikagama and Sritattvanidhi. In Kamikagama, Sharabha is described in the form of a bird with golden color, with two uplifted wings, two red eyes, four legs in the form of a lion touching the ground, four legs with claws upwards, and with an animal tail. The top part of the body is shown as human but with the face of a lion with an ornamented crown; side tusks are also depicted giving an overall frightening sight. It also shows the Narasimha beneath Sharabha's legs as a lion-faced human with anjali (hands folded prayer gesture). (See Infobox image)

In the Sritattvanidhi, the depiction prescribed for Sharabheshvaramurti is of thirty arms; arms on the right are to hold thunderbolt, mushti, abhaya, chakra (discus), sakti, staff, goad, sword, khatvanga, axe, akshamala, a bone, bow, musala, and fire; and the left hands to display noose, varada, mace, arrow, flag, and another type of sword, a snake, a lotus flower, skull-cup, pustaka, plough, and mrudanga with one hand encircling Durga in a hug. This form is extolled to usher good luck, cure all diseases and destroy all enemies.

The Chola dynasty in Tamil Nadu was particularly favourable to the beliefs of Shaiva sect. It is said that the sectarian aspect got highlighted during their reign. This is evident from the four Sharabha images, the earliest at the Vikramsolishwaram temple near Kumbakonam built by Vikrama Chola (1118–35). The other images are at Darasuram and Kampahareshvarar temple, Thirubuvanam built by a Chola ruler, Kulottunga Chola III where Sharabha's image is housed in a separate shrine.

A sculpture of Sharbeshwaramurti in the Tribhuvanam temple, a Shiva temple in Tanjore district, in Tamil Nadu is seen with three legs, with body and face of a lion and a tail. It has four human arms, the right upper hand holds axe, noose is held in the lower right hand, the deer in the upper left hand and fire in the lower left hand. Narasimha is shown with eight arms, flaying and struggling under Sharbeshwaramurti's feet. In the Airavatesvara Temple at Darasuram, a rare image of the Chola period, in black basalt, depicts Shiva as Sharabha. It is deified in an exclusive small shrine, as part man, beast and bird, destroying the man-lion incarnation of Vishnu, Narasimha. This highlights the hostility between the Shaiva and Vaishnava sects. In Chennakeshava Temple, Belur, Karnataka, built in 1113, Gandaberunda, the two-faced bird identified with Vishnu appears in a carved scene of animal mutilation. Initially, a deer is prey to a large python, which is then lifted by an elephant and results in the lion attacking the elephant. The lion is then shown as being devoured by Sharabha, with the last scene depicting Gandaberunda destroying Sharabha.

In iconographic representations of the myth of Shiva vis-à-vis Vishnu, Sharabha form has been built around Narasimha but substantially embellished with wings to represent Kali and Durga to denote the female powers (shaktis) of Shiva; Sharabha is also shown with a bird head and a serpent in his beak.

== In Hindu scriptures ==
=== In the Mahabharata ===
The Hindu epic Mahabharata narrates: a dog, with the help of a rishi (sage) assumes various animal forms - starting from a dog to a tiger then to an elephant followed by a lion and a sharabha - terrorized every one in the hermitage of the rishi. Eventually, Sharabha assumed a further fiercer form. In this fierce form he wanted to devour the rishi. The rishi then narrating the process of change in Sharabha's development, as a result of his benevolence, cursed Sharabha to go back to his original form of a dog. The epic does not relate Shiva to Sharabha.

=== Shaiva views ===
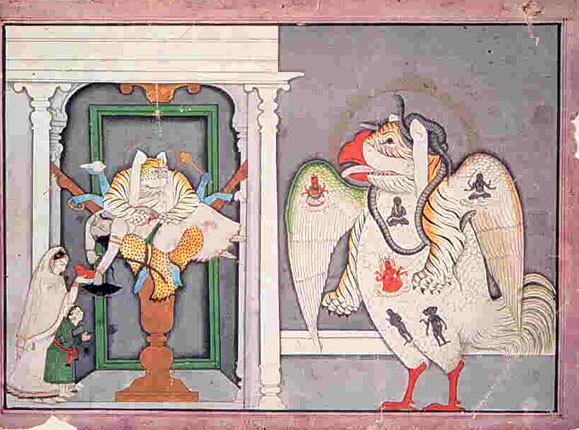
Sharabha (right) with Narasimha killing Hiranyakashipu as Prahlada and his mother look on.

The legend of Sharabha as an incarnation of Shiva is narrated in many Hindu scriptures and each presents a different version according to their beliefs. But one common refrain in all these depictions is that Sharabha is a combination of a huge animal-bird beast with enormous strength manifested with the purpose of pacifying similar ferocious avatar of Vishnu such as Narasimha (man-lion).

The Narasimha-Sharabha legend is linked to deities assuming mythical animal forms to slay or subdue each other. Vishnu assumed the form of Narasimha to slay Hiranyakashipu, an asura (demon) king, who was terrorising the universe, and was a devotee of Shiva.

The Shiva Purana mentions: After slaying Hiranyakashipu, Narasimha's wrath threatened the world. At the behest of the gods, Shiva sent Virabhadra to tackle Narasimha. When that failed, Shiva manifested as Sharabha. The Shiva Purana and some Puranas mention Sharabha attacking Narasimha and immobilising him. He thus quelled Narasimha's terrifying rage. It is also said that Sharabha then decapitated and de-skinned Narasimha so Shiva could wear the hide and lion-head as a garment. The Linga Purana and the Sharabha Upanishad also mention the mutilation and murder of Narasimha. After the mutilation, Vishnu assumed his normal form and retired to his abode, after duly praising Shiva. It was from here on that Shiva came to be known as "Sharabeshamurti" or "Simhagnamurti".

The Skanda Purana considers Narasimha as a mere irritation and not a threat to the world, contrary to what was brought out in the Shiva Purana and the Linga Purana. The perception was that Vishnu may permanently adopt the fierce form of Narasimha, which would be detrimental to his divine role. Hence, the purpose of Shiva-Sharabha was to ensure that Vishnu discarded his lion body and returned to his original divine form. Narasimha struck Sharabha with his body, it was Vishnu who groaned in pain and not Sharabha who was in an "adamantine body". It was then that Vishnu realised that Sharabha was none other than Shiva and bowed and praised Sharabha. Shiva then blesses Vishnu and gives him a boon to kill demons. A purana ends the story with the gods fearing that Sharabha may not be able to control his rage and thus urging Shiva to give up his Sharabha form. Thereafter, Shiva dismembered Sharabha's form; his limbs were given away and his torso became a Kapalika. In Vamana Purana's version, Sharabha doesn't have upper hand over Narasimha and it ends with Narasimha becoming the calm Vishnu again and Sharabha becoming a lingam when Narada looks at them. One version also mentions that Sharabha, after subduing Narasimha, assumed his original form of a lion, the mount of goddess Durga and returned to rest at her feet.

In the Kalika Purana, Varaha - Vishnu's boar avatar - had amorous dalliance with the earth goddess. He and his three boar sons then created mayhem in the world, which necessitated Shiva to take the form of Sharabha, to kill the Varaha form. Here, Narasimha appears to aid Varaha. After Being Bestowed strength by Vishnu, Sharabha kills Narasimha first and then kills Varaha, allowing Vishnu to reabsorb the energies of both his forms. This version of the story finds an allusion in the Prapanchasara Tantra.

=== Vaishnava views ===
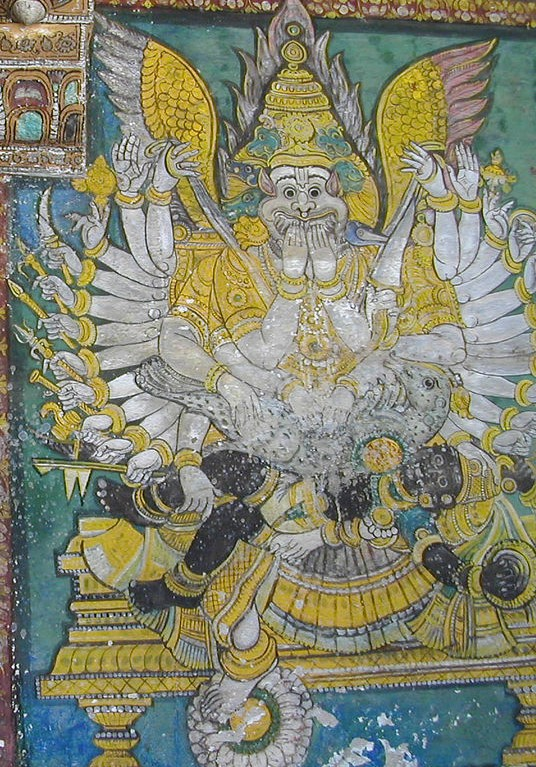
Painting of Gandabherunda slaying Sharabha and Hiranyakashipu, depicted on his lap.

Vaiṣṇava scholars, including prominent 16th century Dvaita sectarian such as Vijayīndra Tīrtha, reject the depiction of Narasiṁha being subdued or destroyed by Śarabha. They dismiss the Śaiva Purāṇas that contain such narratives as tāmasic(imbued with ignorance) and therefore not authoritative within the Vaiṣṇava tradition. Vijayīndra Tīrtha addresses the refutation of the Śarabha legend, along with ten other Śaivite accounts, in his work Śaivasarvasvakhaṇḍanam.

There is also a reference to Sharabha in the Vishnu Sahasranama, the thousand names of Vishnu, and the literal meaning seems to suggest the praise of Sharabha (the lion-killing animal). Adi Shankara refers to this 356th name of Vishnu Sahasranama as not mentioning the lion-killing animal at all and instead interprets the name to mean, "As the Lord shines in the body as the indwelling Self, He is called Sharabha, while the body is sara (perishable)."

Narasimhan Krishnamachari, a scholar on the Vishishtadvaita philosophy, states that the name "Sharabha" has been interpreted in two ways namely; the first interpretation means "the Destroyer (of those who transgress the bounds of ethics)," as given by the Sri Vaishnava commentator, Parasara Bhattar and the second interpretation as given by Adi Shankara, among others. The former is based on the Sanskrit verb SR, which means "to injure to destroy". According to C. V. Radhakrishna Sastri, "Sara also refers to an arrow, and the perishable body shines if it is aimed at Bhagavan, because He shines in that body."

== In Buddhist scriptures ==
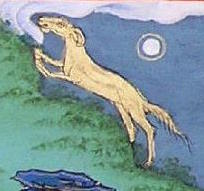
Sharabha is depicted similar to a deer, folio from Jataka tales.

In the Jataka tales of the Buddha's previous lives, there is narration related to his birth as Bodhisattva in a forest as a Sharabha, the eight-legged deer. A king, while trying to hunt the deer, fell into a precipice with his horse. The deer, instead of abandoning the king to his fate, rescued him. The king was deeply touched by the compassionate gesture and banned hunting in his country.

In Tibetan Buddhism, sharabha is represented as a beast with a goat's head and horns, a lion's mane and horse's body and legs. It symbolizes determination, strength and speed. Sometimes, it is represented additionally with horns of an antelope and claws of an eagle. Sometimes, the goat head is replaced by a lion's, horse's feet by a lion's and horns can be of a ram. A common feature of all representations is the horse's body. It is often depicted as mounts of young Devas or dwarfs in a Torana – a six-level archway behind an enlightenment throne of a Buddha or Bodhisattva. Together with the devas, they symbolize the perfection of effort (virya).

== As emblem ==
The Karnataka state emblem, flanked by Sharabhas and centered by the Gandaberunda

The Government of Karnataka, the University of Mysore and the Karnataka Soaps and Detergents Limited have adopted Sharabha, with modifications in their emblem.

In Karnataka Soaps and Detergents Limited logo, Sharabha is depicted in the form of a body of a lion with the head of an elephant to represent the virtues of wisdom, courage and strength.

== See also ==
- Yali (Hindu mythology)
- Griffin
- Sphinx
