= Arjuna Ratha =

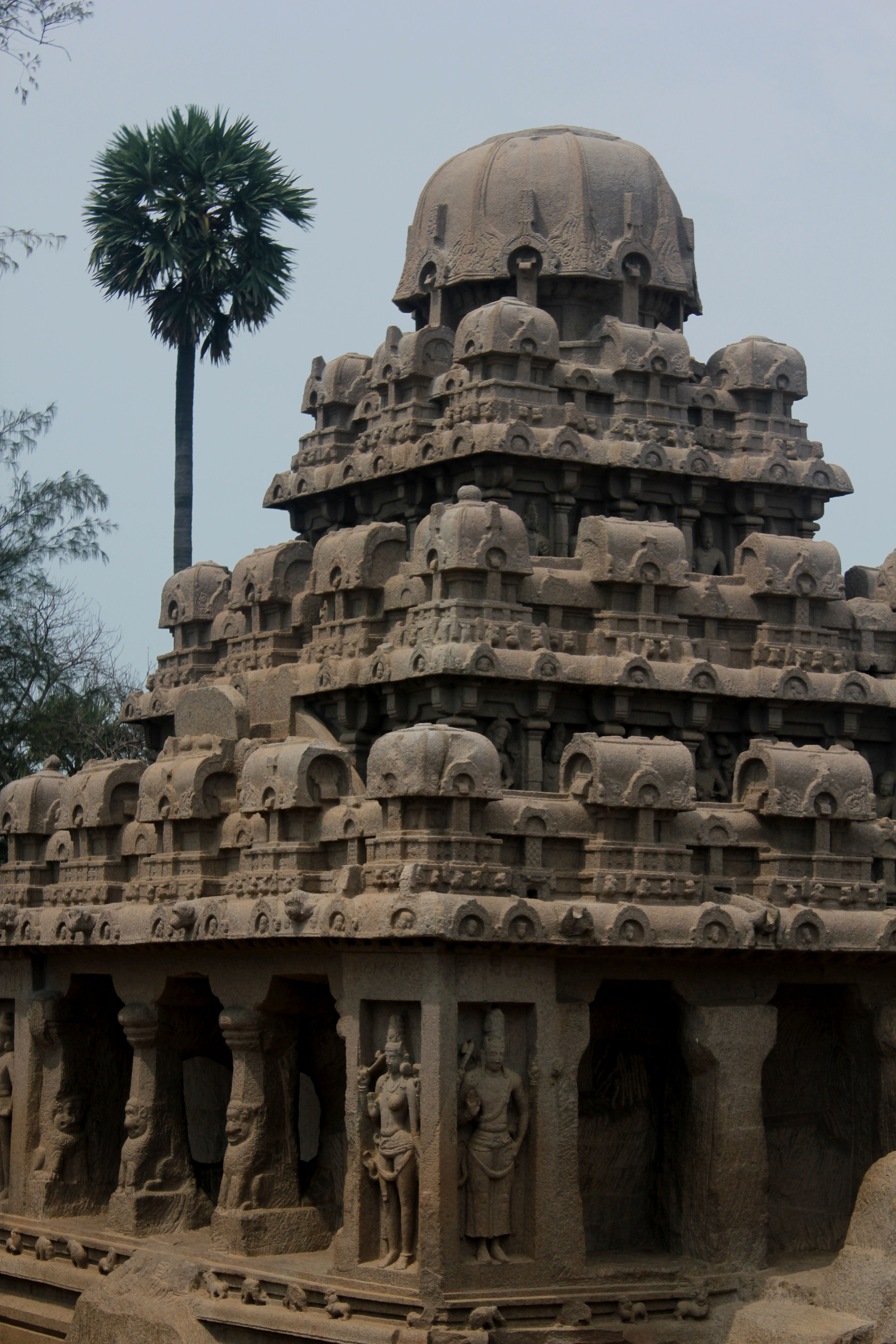
- Arjuna Ratha

Religion
- Affiliation: Hinduism
- District: Kancheepuram district
- Deity: Shiva

Location
- Location: Mahabalipuram
- State: Tamil Nadu,
- Country: India
- Interactive map of Arjuna Ratha
- Coordinates: 12°36′32″N 80°11′23″E

Architecture
- Completed: c. 650 Common era

Arjuna Ratha is a monument from the Pallava Period at Mahabalipuram, on the Coromandel Coast of the Bay of Bengal, in Kancheepuram district of Tamil Nadu, India. Dated to the seventh century, it is an example of early Dravidian architecture and of monolith Indian rock-cut architecture dating from the late 7th century during reign of King Mahendravarman I and his son Narasimhavarman I (630–680 AD) of the Pallava Kingdom. One of the Pancha Rathas, it is believed to have been completed before the Dharmaraja Ratha, and like that and the Bhima Ratha, the stone temple is a replica of an earlier wooden version which preceded it. It is one of the Group of Monuments at Mahabalipuram designated as a UNESCO World Heritage Site since 1984.

== Geography ==
The structure is located at Mahabalipuram (previously known as Mammallapuram) on the Coromandel Coast of the Bay of Bengal in the Indian Ocean, in Kancheepuram district. It is approximately 35 miles (56 km) south of Chennai (previously known as Madras), the capital city, while Chengalpattu is about 20 miles (32 km) distant.

== History ==
Like the other four Pancha Rathas, this stone edifice is a replica of a wooden version which preceded it. The monument is incomplete.

== Architecture ==
All of the Pancha Rathas are aligned in a north–south direction and share a common plinth which is north–south oriented and has a gentle slope. They have no precedent in Indian architecture and have proved to be "templates" for building larger temples in the South Indian tradition of Dravidian temple architecture. Though cut out of monolithic rocks, they are carved in the form of structural temples in regular building form and hence termed as "quasimonolithic temple form".

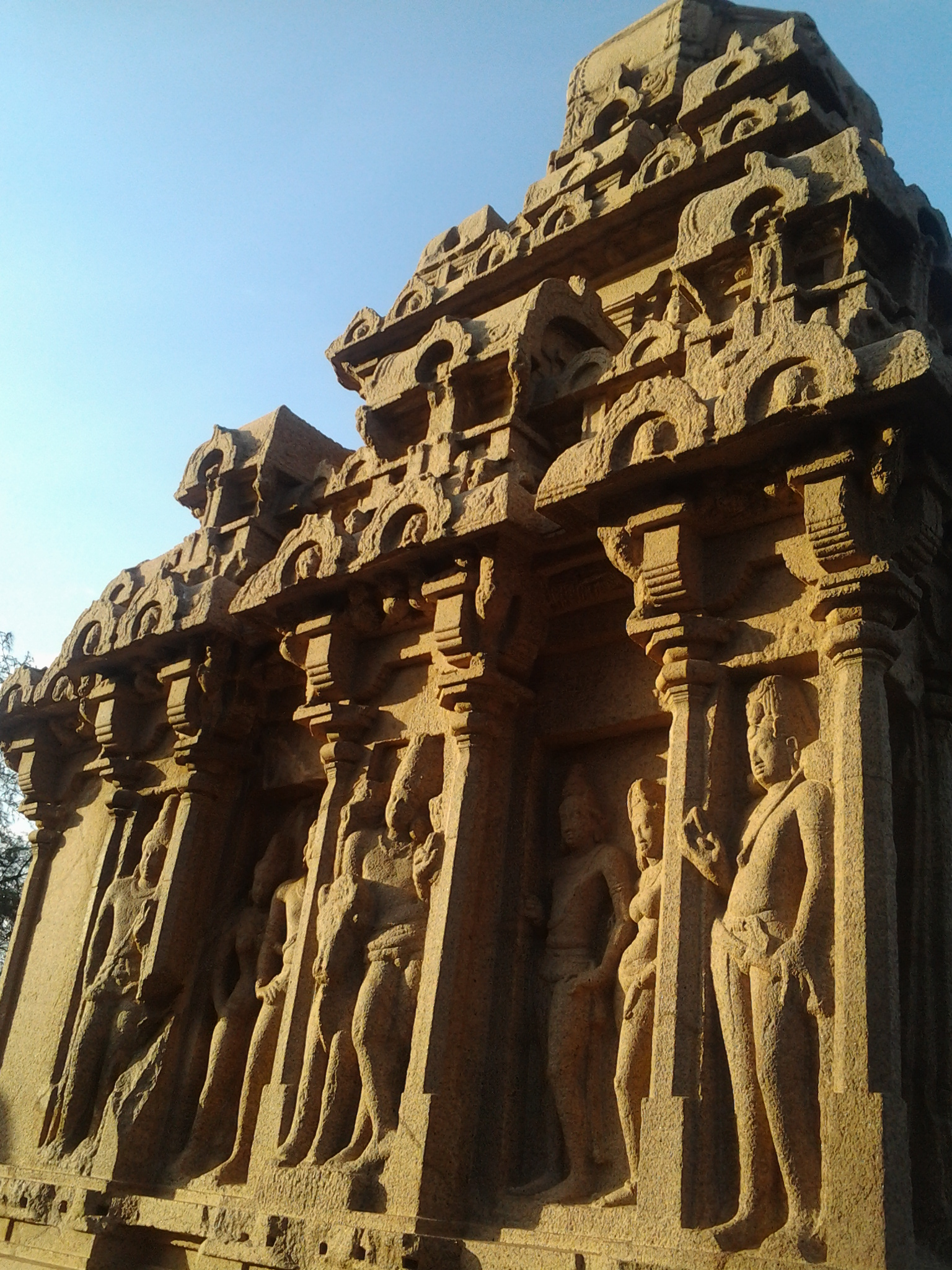
A close view of carvings on the external wall of the Arjuna Ratha.

=== Layout ===
The ratha is a simple structure, resembling a small palace or pavilion. It is carved over an elongated stone rock formation, a protrusion above the sand near the coast (which has a gradually rising slope from the north end to the southern end) of a moulded plinth, with a square plan similar to the Dharmaraja Ratha. It faces west and measures 11.5 by 16 feet (3.5 m × 4.9 m) and is 20 feet (6.1 m) in height. It is on the same upapitha (secondary platform) as the Draupadi Ratha next to it.

=== Features ===
This ratha is similar in form to the Dharmaraja Ratha except that it has one less tier at the top, and has an octagonal dome with a stone lion carved in the front yard. It is a monolithic rock-cut ratha with a garbhagriha (sanctum sanctorum), a dvitala (two-tiered) Vimana (flying aircraft) with a mukhamandapa (inner porch). It has two levels and has one shrine. It is also square in plan. In many ways, it rhythmically mirrors the Dharmaraja ratha. For example, the decoration and structure of cornice, kudus and the haras are similar. The shikhara of the Arjuna ratha, however, is octagonal. The walls of the ratha are carved into panels with fourteen sculptures. Four of these are dvarapalas, one Vishnu, a rishi (sage) with a student, a Kartikeya (Murugan) which could alternatively be Indra, one Shiva with Nandi, and the rest are human beings shown in different stages of their life including couples. The Arjuna ratha has a lion and Nandi bull on each side between it and the Draupadi ratha that follows next, but their orientation suggests that this ratha was not meant for Shiva. According to Susan Huntington, it is unclear for whom this temple was meant and she states it could be Ayyappa (Dharma-shasta). The tower consists of a round shikara. The monument looks odd on its side, partly because its original pillars were lost and have been replaced with modern era restorative pillars that do not fit with the texture or style of the original creation. There is a standing elephant to the northwest of the Arjuna ratha.

Surface ornamentation is a prominent feature in the ratha.

The adhisthana (platform of the main deity) is in simple Padabandha style. It has slit-niches between finely carved pillars displaying deities such as Vishnu, Skanda on an elephant and Shiva as Siva-Vrishabhantika (riding a Nandi (bull), and figures such as Parthiharas, a Siddha, a Chowri bearer, apsaras and others. The central sculpture is a depiction of Shiva crossing his legs and leaning on Nandi. One of the sculptures in the south wall is known as the "Ardhanareeswara", representing masculinity through the twist in the brows and the holding hands and femininity in the subtle raise of Uma's hips. On this wall the depiction of two ladies is also of note.

It has a life-size Nandi sculpture facing west. Dvarapalas or guards are not carved at the entry facade but are seen on the exterior faces of the ratha due to lack of space inside the shrine.

== Gallery ==
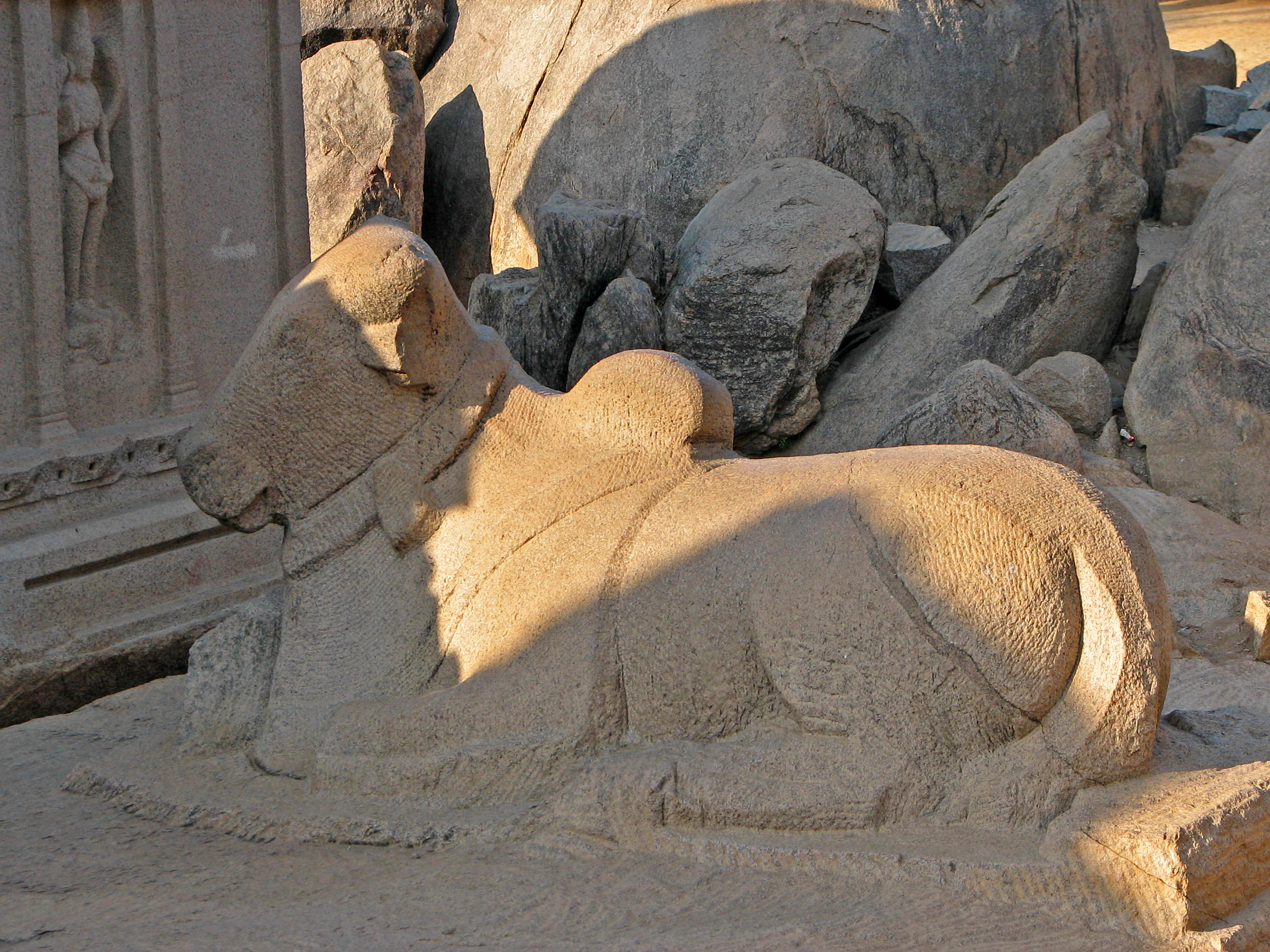
Nandi sculpture behind Arjuna Ratha

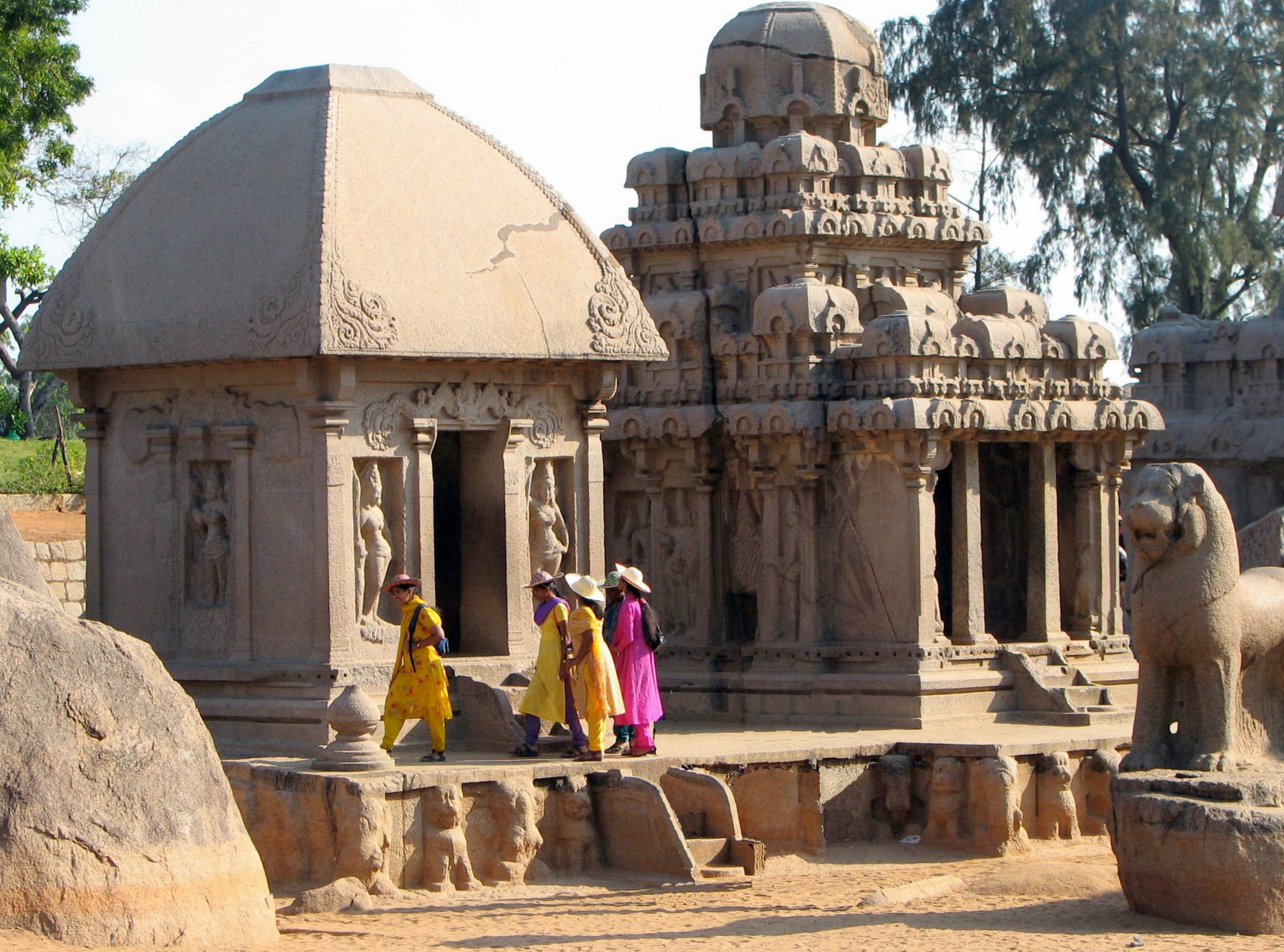
Draupadi and Arjuna rathas on the same upapitha (secondary platform)
