= Bhima Ratha =

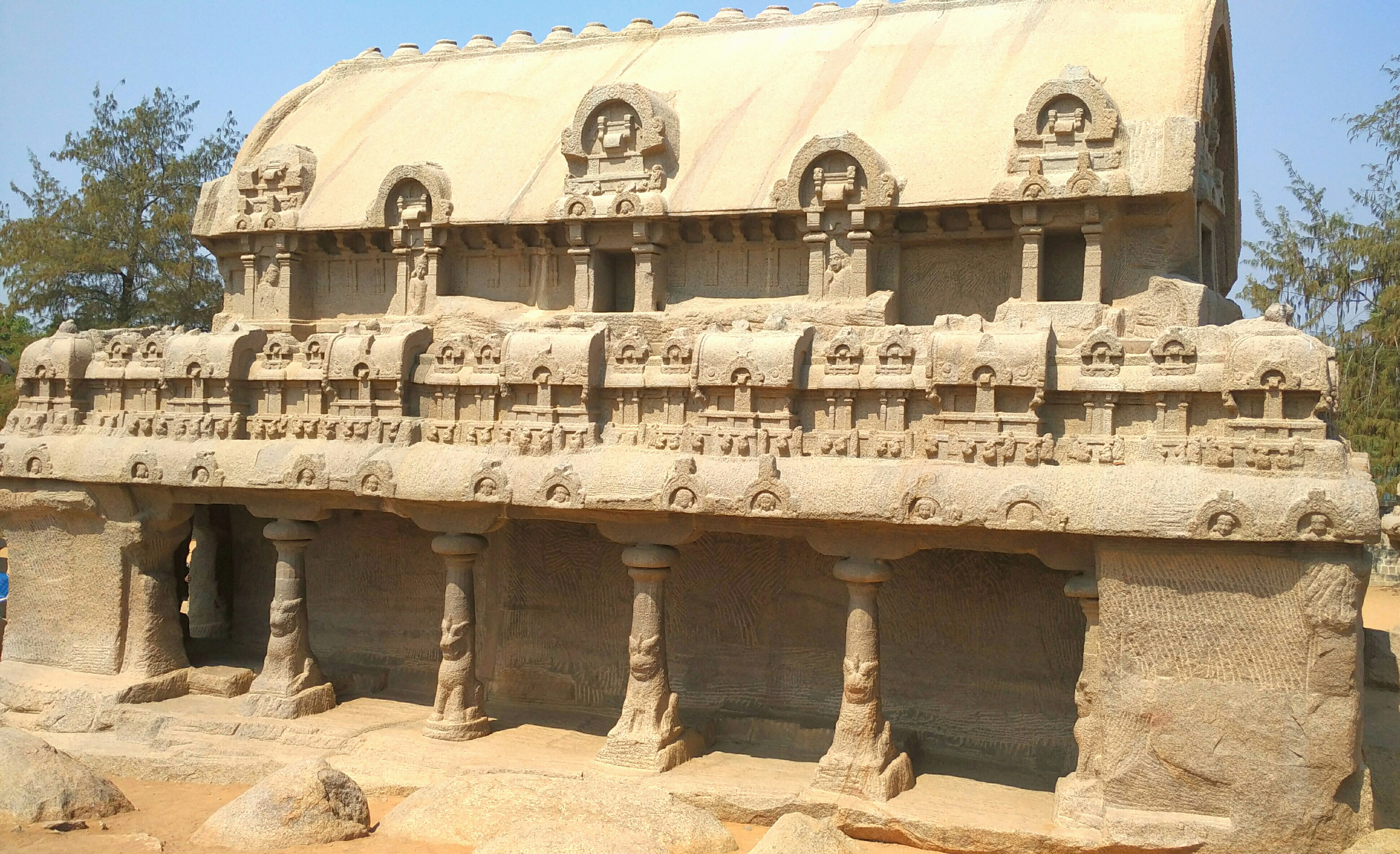
- Bhima Ratha

Religion
- Affiliation: Hinduism
- District: Kancheepuram district
- Deity: Shiva

Location
- Location: Mahabalipuram
- State: Tamil Nadu,
- Country: India
- Interactive map of Bhima Ratha

Architecture
- Completed: c. 650 Common era

Bhima Ratha is a monument in the Pancha Rathas complex at Mahabalipuram, on the Coromandel Coast of the Bay of Bengal, in the Kancheepuram district of the state of Tamil Nadu, India. It is an example of monolith Indian rock-cut architecture. Dating from the late 7th century, it is attributed to the reign of King Mahendravarman I and his son Narasimhavarman I (630–680 AD; also called Mamalla, or "great warrior") of the Pallava Kingdom. The entire complex is under the auspices of the Archaeological Survey of India (ASI), and is one of the Group of Monuments at Mahabalipuram designated as a UNESCO World Heritage Site since 1984.

It is built in a form which resembles a folk-house with sloping roofs with its sides forming a curved gablelike arch over a rectangular room with a veranda. It is likely, due to the advanced design of the Mamallapuram shrines, that temple building had previously undergone a substantial process of development, and that the shrines mark a rapid transition from the earlier wooden temples to later structural monuments in stone it is carved out of a single, long stone of granite. Though sometimes mistakenly referred to as a temple, the structure was not consecrated because it was not completed following the death of Narasimhavarman I. The structure is named after one of the Pancha Pandavas, of epic Mahabharata fame, though the nomenclature is not supported by its iconography. It is dedicated to Vishnu.

== Geography ==
The monument is located at Mahabalipuram (previously known as Mammallapuram) on the Coromandel Coast of the Bay of Bengal of Indian Ocean in Kancheepuram district. It is approximately 35 miles (56 km) south of Chennai (previously known as Madras), the capital city, while Chengalpattu is about 20 miles (32 km) distant.

== History ==
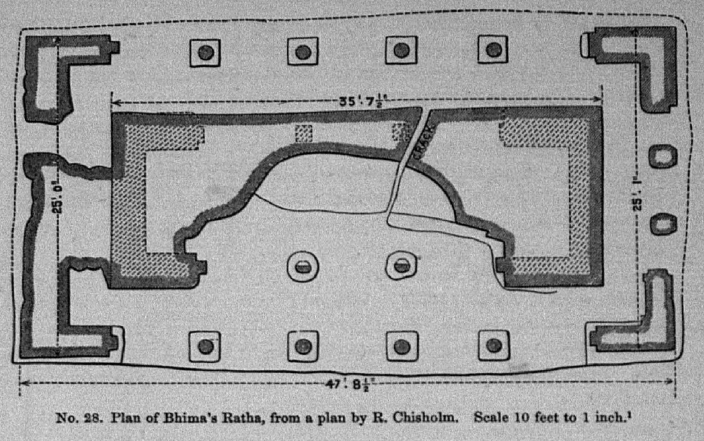
Plan of Bhima's Ratha

Like the other four Pancha Rathas, this stone edifice is a replica of a wooden version which preceded it. The monument is incomplete.

== Architecture ==
All the Pancha Rathas are aligned in a north–south direction and share a common plinth. They have no precedent in Indian architecture in stone and have proved to be "templates" for building larger temples in the South Indian tradition of Dravidian temple architecture. Though cut out of monolithic rocks, they are carved in the form of structural temples in regular building form and hence termed as "quasimonolithic temple form".

=== Layout ===
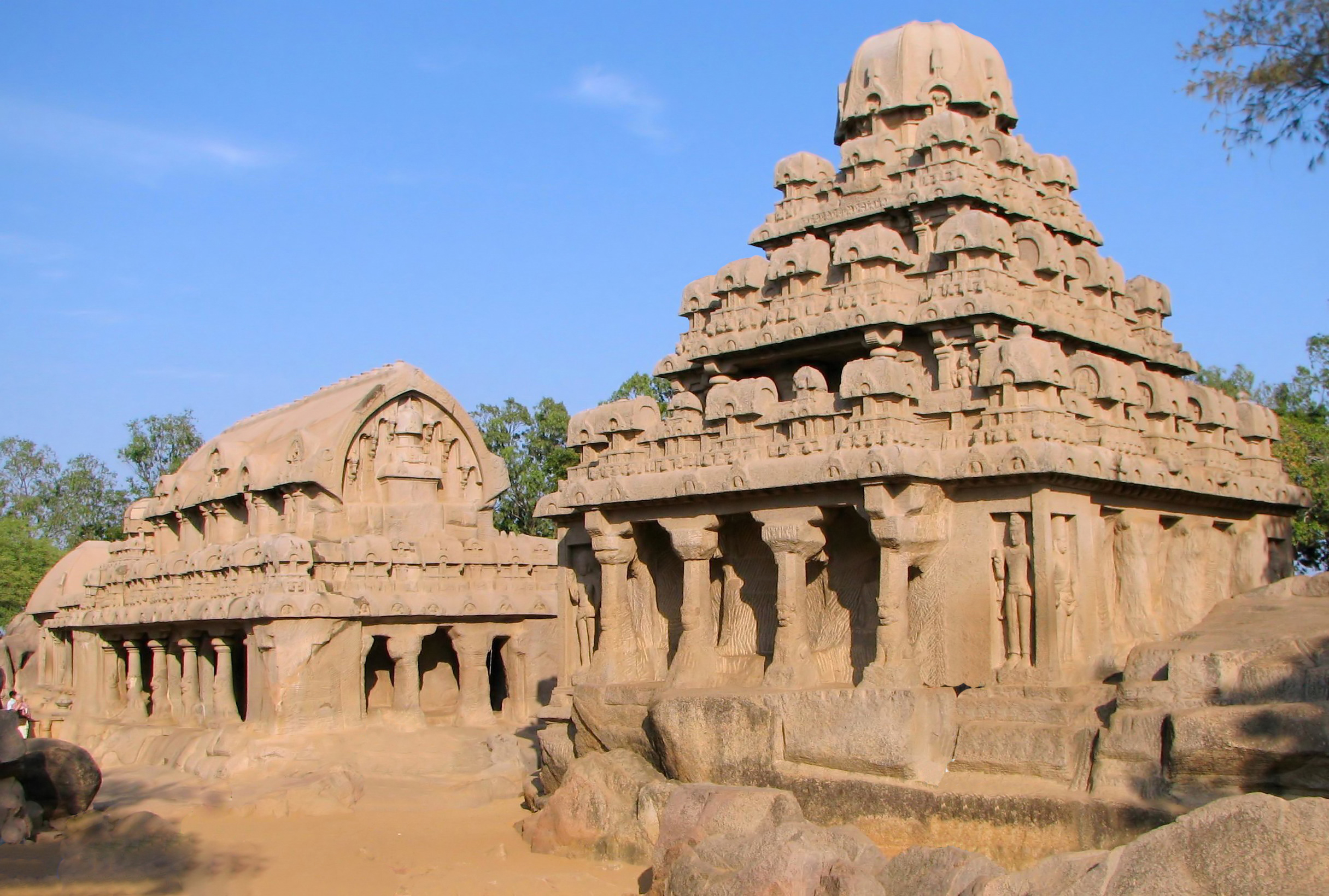
Bhima Ratha to the left of Dharmaraja Ratha

Similar to the Arjuna and Dharmaraja Rathas, the stone temple is a replica of an earlier wooden version which preceded it. Bhima Ratha is an ektala or single tiered oblong temple, with a barrel-vaulted roof and ornate columns. It is the third ratha after Draupadi and Arjuna Rathas, carved over an extended long pink granite rock out crop that gradually rises from the north to south. It is cut out over a base plan of 42 by 24 feet (12.8 m × 7.3 m), and rising to a height of 25 feet (7.6 m) over two floors. The ground floor has remained incomplete. The unfinished features of the lower floor gives a picture of what was planned to be built, namely a circumambulatory passage supported on pillars mounted with lion posts as the base. The oblong scheme of the layout is conjectured as a plan that was intended to house an Anantashayana Vishnu (reclining image of god Vishnu).

=== Features ===
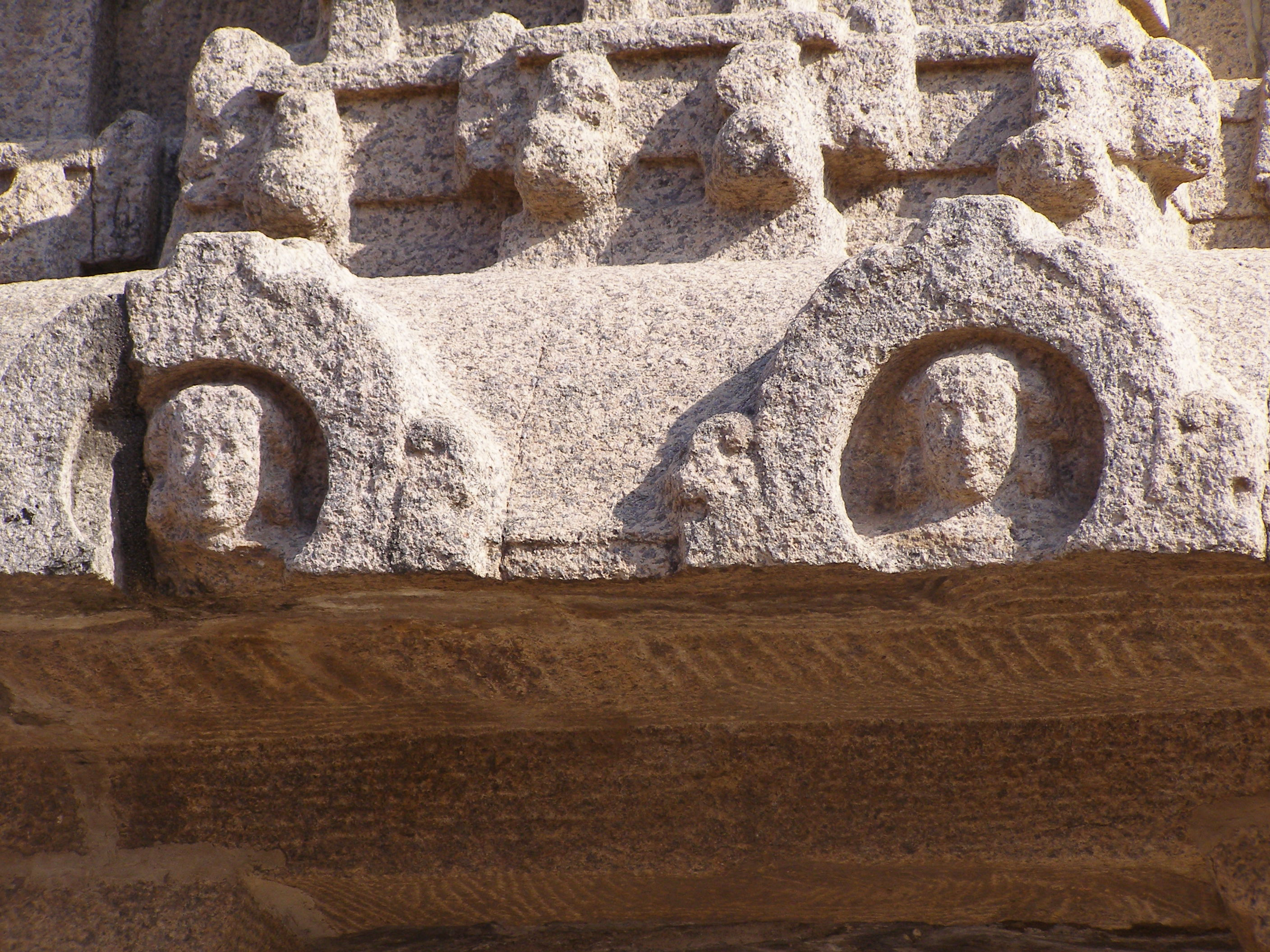
Kudu on the exterior face of Bhima Ratha

The ratha is reminiscent of Buddhist cave architecture, such as Sala-Shikhara. Archaeologist, however, are of the opinion that the stupa suggests a shikhara (temple tower) style; there are twelve such styles depicted in all the rathas experimented by sculptors during the Pallvava period. It is also mentioned that it has palace architectural style considering its barrel vaulting and long columned porch. The roof section resembles a thatched roof with its sides forming a curved gablelike arch over a rectangular room. The Bhima Ratha has a pillared open veranda, a column with a Pallava seated lion, and "horseshoe-arch dormer like projections" called kudus. These decorations are carved on the external faces of the ratha, above the cornices which also forms the dividing line between the ground floor and the first floor of the structure. Oblong-shaped shrines are carved at the cornices linked with a passage. The small shrines have a wagon-type roof supported on lion mounted pillars. The ends of the gables have fine decorative motifs, with a miniature model of a square at the centre. The niches seen are carved with regular spacing and are supported on two pilasters. Nasikas are mentioned in inscriptions inside the temple.
