= Draupadi Ratha =

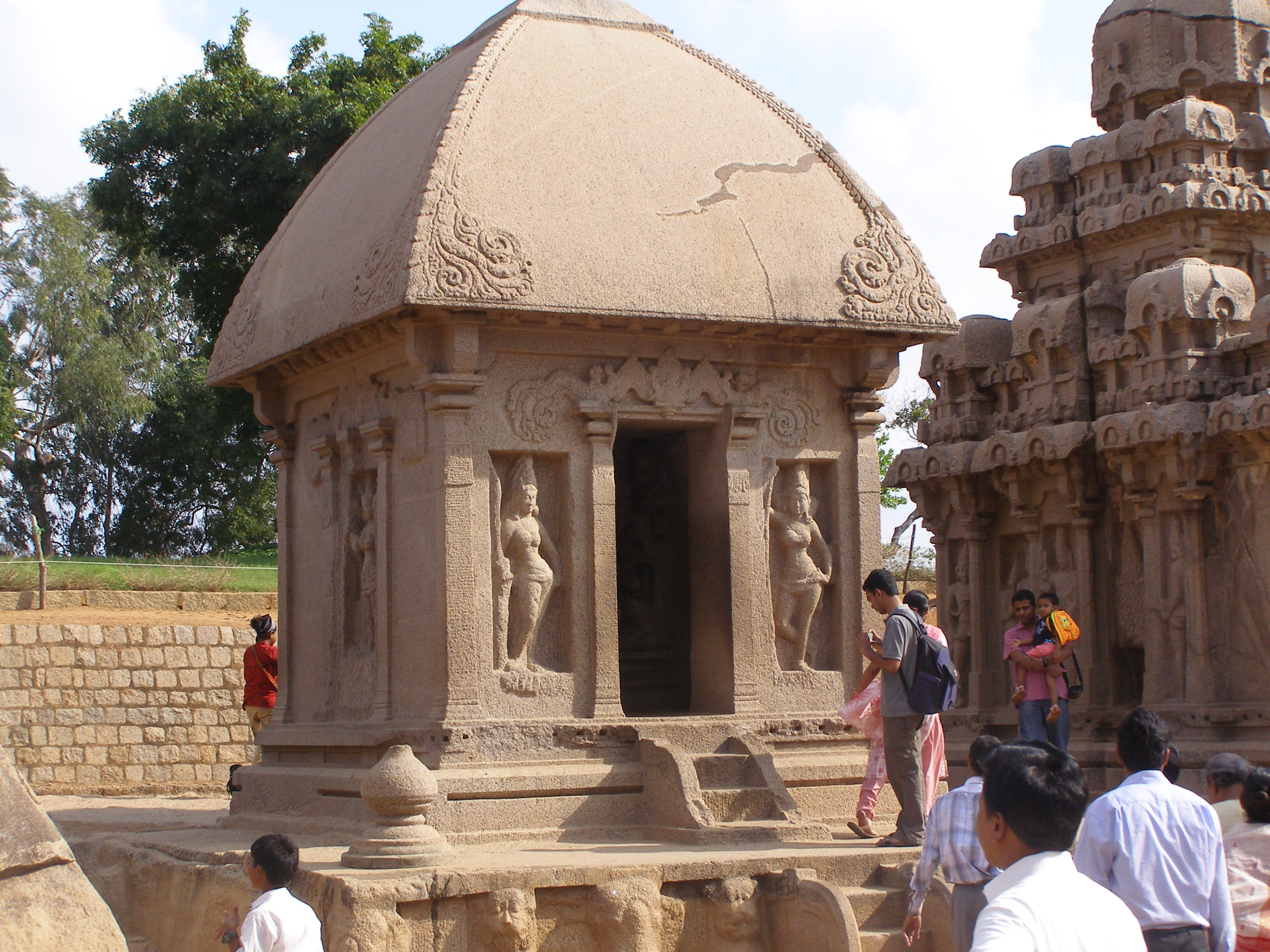
- Draupadi Ratha

Religion
- Affiliation: Hinduism
- District: Kancheepuram district
- Deity: Durga

Location
- Location: Mahabalipuram
- State: Tamil Nadu,
- Country: India
- Interactive map of Draupadi Ratha
- Coordinates: 12°36′32″N 80°11′23″E

Architecture
- Completed: c. 650 Common era

The Draupadi Ratha is a monument in the Pancha Rathas complex at Mahabalipuram, previously called Mamallapuram, on the Coromandel Coast of the Bay of Bengal, in the Kancheepuram district of the state of Tamil Nadu, India. It is an example of monolithic Indian rock-cut architecture. Dating from the late 7th century, it is attributed to the reign of King Mahendravarman I and his son Narasimhavarman I (630–680 AD; also called Mamallan, or "great warrior") of the Pallava Kingdom. The entire complex is under the auspices of the Archaeological Survey of India (ASI), and is one of the Group of Monuments at Mahabalipuram designated as a UNESCO World Heritage Site since 1984.

Resembling a chariot (ratha), it is carved out of a single, long stone of granite. Though sometimes mistakenly referred to as a temple, the structure was not consecrated because it was not completed due to the death of Narasimhavarman I. The structure is named after the common consort Draupadi of the Pancha Pandavas, of epic Mahabharata fame, though the nomenclature is not supported by history. The unfinished structure is dedicated to the goddess Durga.

== Geography ==
The site is located at Mahabalipuram (previously known as Mammallapuram) on the Coromandel Coast of the Bay of Bengal of Indian Ocean in Kancheepuram district. It is approximately 35 miles (56 km) south of Chennai (previously known as Madras), the capital city, while Chengalpattu is about 20 miles (32 km) distant.

The Draupadi Ratha is at the northern extreme end of the Pancha Rathas, on the elongated bedrock upon which they are carved. The ground slope rises from the north end towards the southern direction.

== History ==
The feature of this ratha and the other four cannot be definitely dated to any other similar constructions in the past in any ancient Indian architecture. However, the five rathas have been forerunners or templates for the development of Indian temple architecture. Like the other four Pancha Rathas, this stone one is a replica of a wooden version which preceded it. Though it is considered to be a monolith temple, "temple" is a misnomer given that the five rathas were never completed, as evidenced by uncarved bedrock at the pinnacle. Hence, the rathas were neither consecrated nor worship offered. The incomplete status of all the five rathas is attributed to the death of the king Narasimhavarman I in 668 AD. Even the epic name, Draupadi, the common spouse of the Pandavas, is not supported by history. Along with several other monuments, this ratha gained UNESCO World Heritage Site distinction in 1984 as "Group of Monuments at Mahabalipuram." The temple is dedicated to the Goddess Durga, though the deity is reported to be of a later period.

== Architecture ==
All the Pancha Rathas are aligned in a north–south direction and share a common plinth. They have no precedent in Indian architecture and have proved to be "templates" for building larger temples in the South Indian tradition of Dravidian temple architecture. Though cut out of monolithic rocks, they are carved in the form of structural temples in regular building form and hence termed as "quasimonolithic temple form."

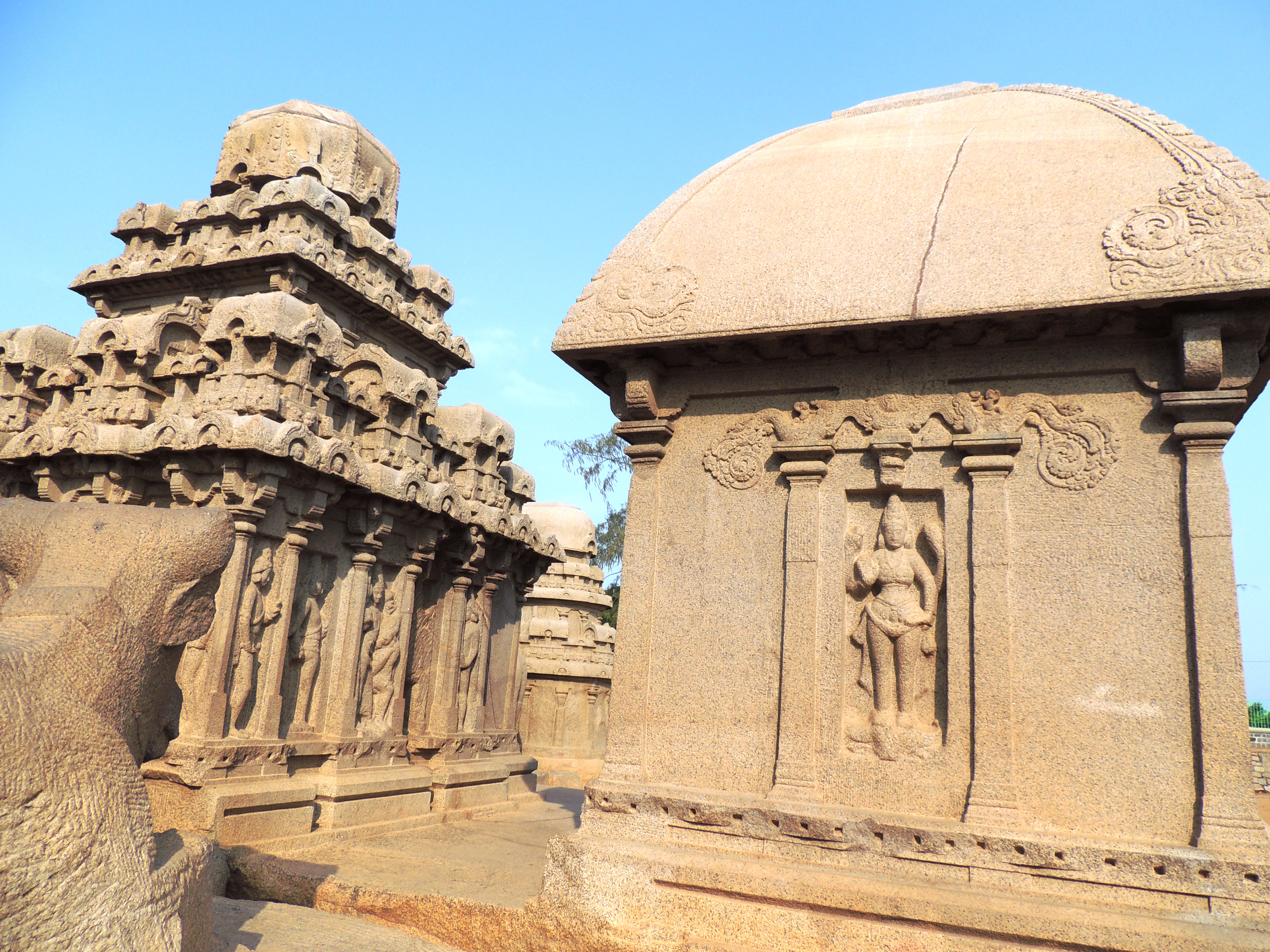
Arjuna and Draupadi rathas, with Durga on the east wall and Nandi on the side.

=== Layout ===
Draupadi is the smallest of the five rathas at the site and is carved out of single long stone of granite. It is built in the form of simple hut, sharing an upapitha (secondary platform) with Arjuna Ratha. The ratha is in a square plan and is in the shape of a bangla ("a hut in Bengal"). Its exterior dimensions are 11 by 11 feet (3.4 m × 3.4 m), rising to a height of 18 feet (5.5 m). Over the upapptha, which forms a common platform with the Arjuna Ratha, a stupi has been carved out of the bedrock in the corner and has not been separated from the main shrine. The roof has curvilinear shape and ends as a square of 2.5 feet (0.76 m) at the top. The finial is missing. The thatched roof, Kutagara, is a Vimana shrine. It has been carved out of granite rocks, beginning from the top of the rock working downwards to the base. The roof is similar to that of a hut, with decorative motifs in the joints. The entrance of the temple faces west. The entry door is carved over a high rise platform, which is supported by on which is supported on elephant and lion heads of large size in alternating sequence. There are "makara torana" arch decorations with two bends above the entrance door; these toranas are typical of Mahendraverma's style and are also seen in caves and later got modified to a single bend style during Rajasimha's rule. The entrance door is 6’-7" by 2’-11" in size and the chamber which houses the deities measures 6.5 feet (2.0 m) in length and 4.5 feet (1.4 m) width. The temple is classified as Manikkoil, temples with only a single-tiered roof consisting of only Kantha, Stupi and Kalasa.

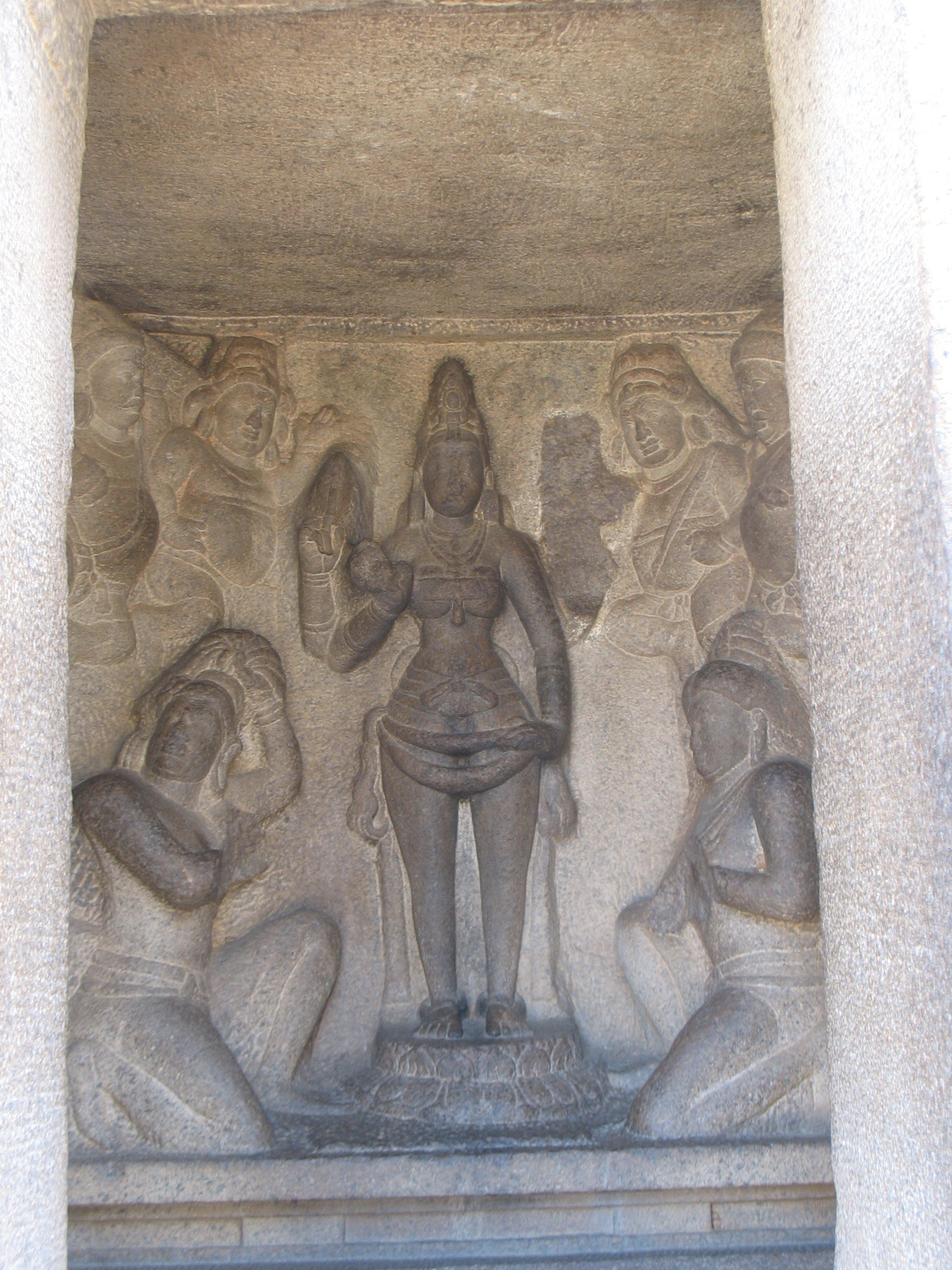
Fresco of Durga image being worshipped by devotees within the ratha's sanctum.

=== Features ===
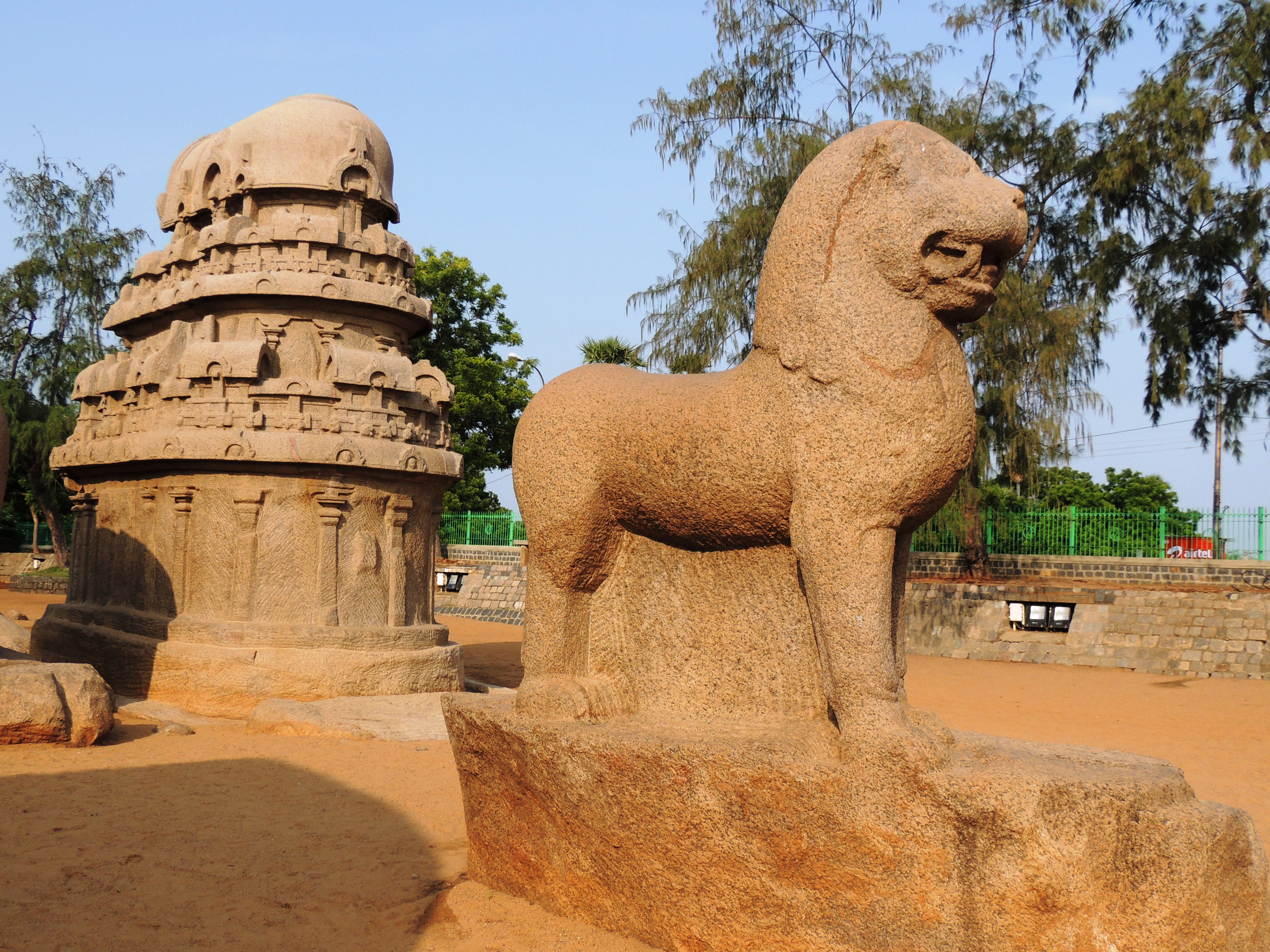
Lion sculpture next to the Draupadi Ratha

Numerous images of Durga are seen represented in the temple, notably on the sanctum and also on the exterior surface of the east facing wall. The shalabhanjikas or two female dwarapalakas guard the doorway, which are also in the form of the Goddess. The temple is stated to generate "primal energy" in consonance with the characteristics of deity of Durga; the dwarapalika on the left has a bow in her hand and that on the right has a sword. The sanctum depicts Durga on the back wall standing on a lotus, in what is termed as "sambhaga" (standing) posture with four hands, with the upper hands carrying a shankha and a chakra and one lower hand is in an vara mudra (posture of a blessing) and the other hand is on hip. The ornament worn is a breast-band without any halter straps. She is surrounded by devotees with a devotee on her left about to decapitate himself as an offering (in another version it is inferred as a flower offering by the devotee), and another devotee (with tied tresses exposing his neck to be cut} on her right mutilating his body parts, also in offering; this was a Hindu rite associated with the Kapalikas. This type of offering to a goddess, though ghastly, is seen in many Durga temples; it is related to the myth of her role as Mahisasuramardini (slayer of demon Mahishasura). Durga images in niches have depictions of the goddess standing on a buffalo head representing the Mahishasura.

The adoption of the elephant-lion combination is inferred as more of a Buddhist tradition which was modified in the Pallava architectural style when animal motifs were added. The lion, which is the vehicle of Durga, is a 6 feet (1.8 m) high stone sculpture carved from a boulder located in the prakara of the ratha. In the three niches in the chamber of the temple carvings are shown within two pilasters with decorations of a "florid makara torana" with double bends. The depictions inside the ratha also include four ganas (goblins) at the top of the central panel, flanking Durga; two goblins on outer side are holding small swords whereas those on inner side are shown with one hand raised in worship mode.

== Gallery ==
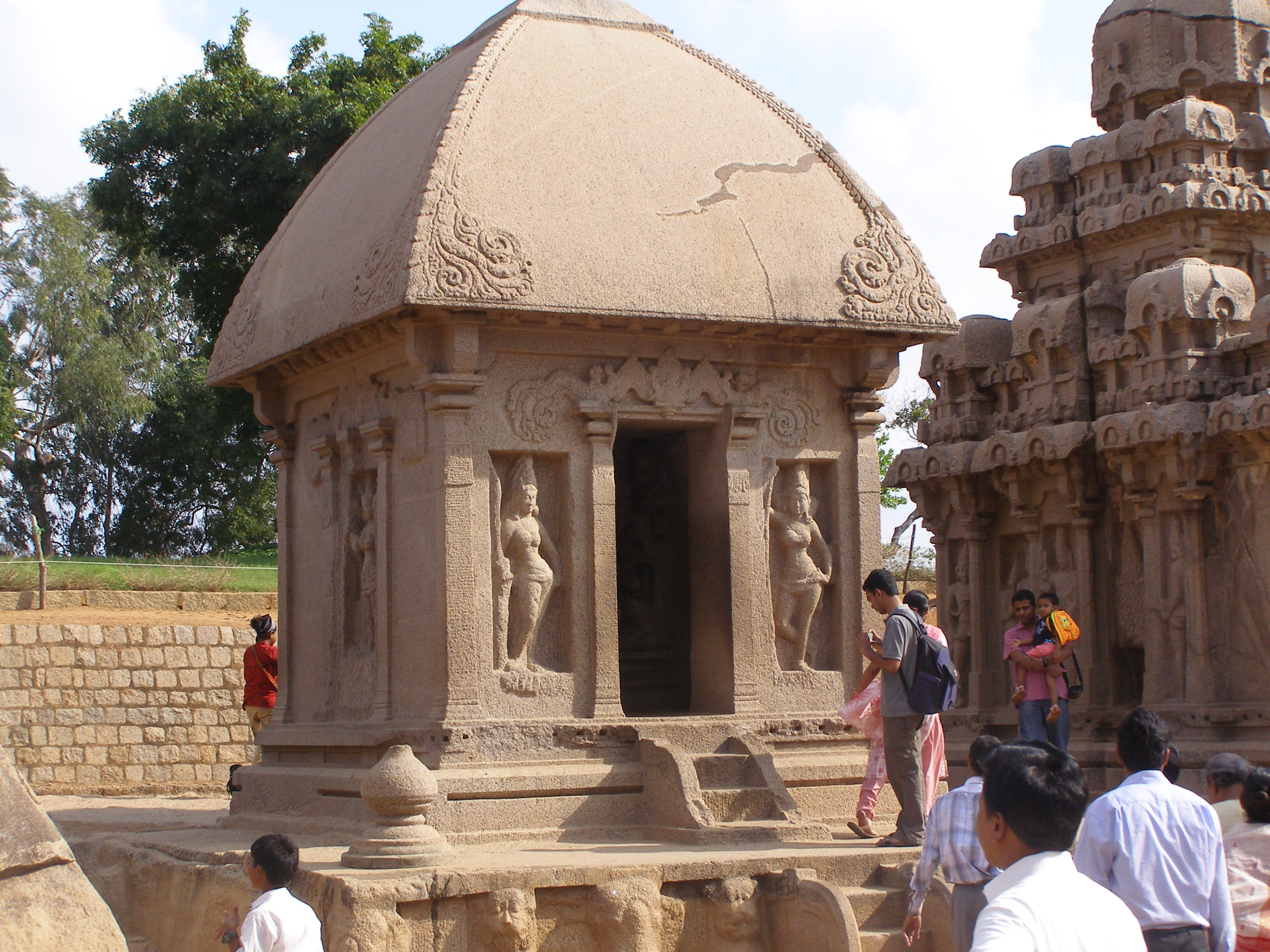
Draupadi Ratha

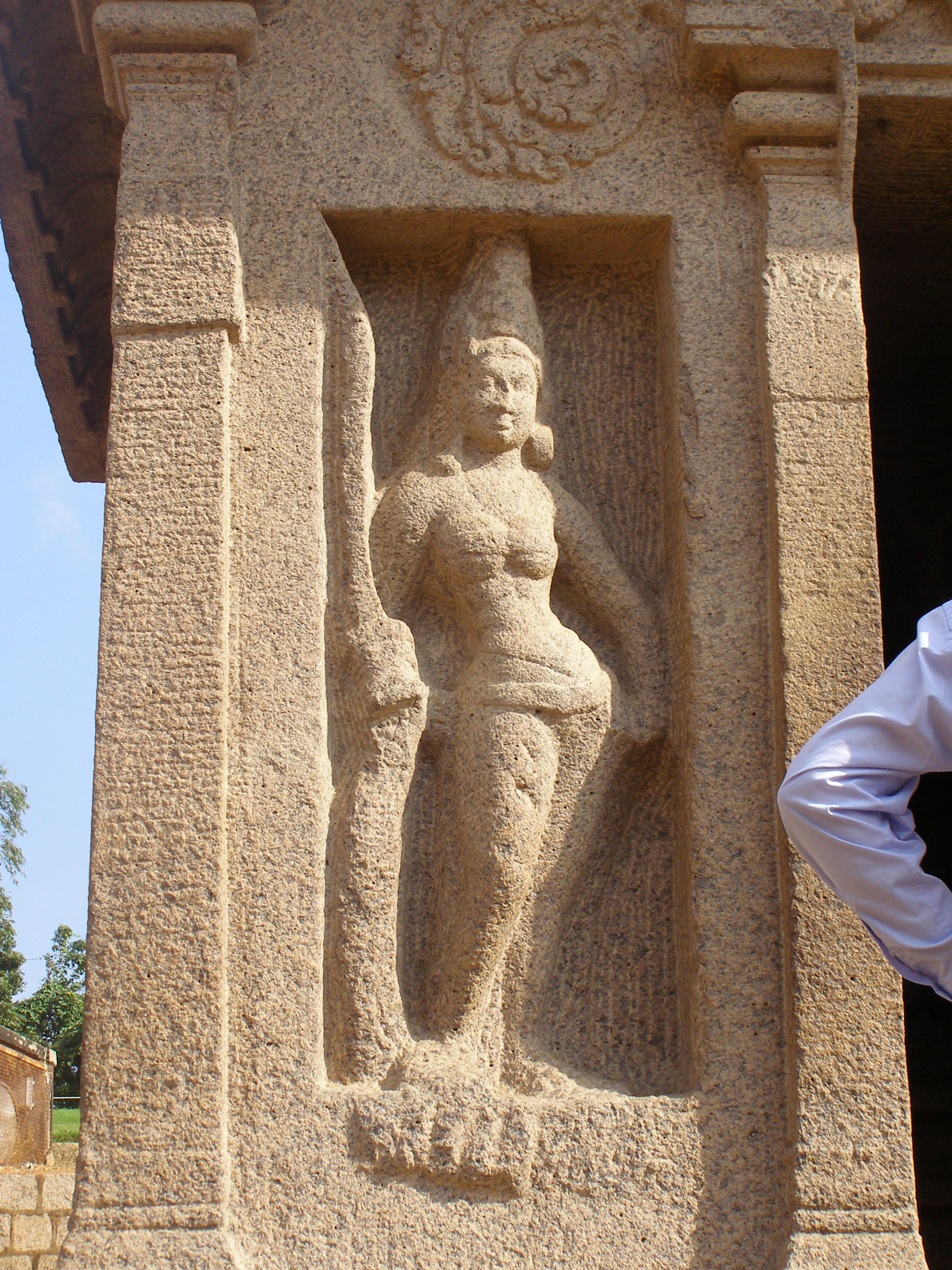
Exterior detail of Draupadi Ratha
