= Pancha Rathas =

UNESCO World Heritage monument complex in India

UNESCO World Heritage Site
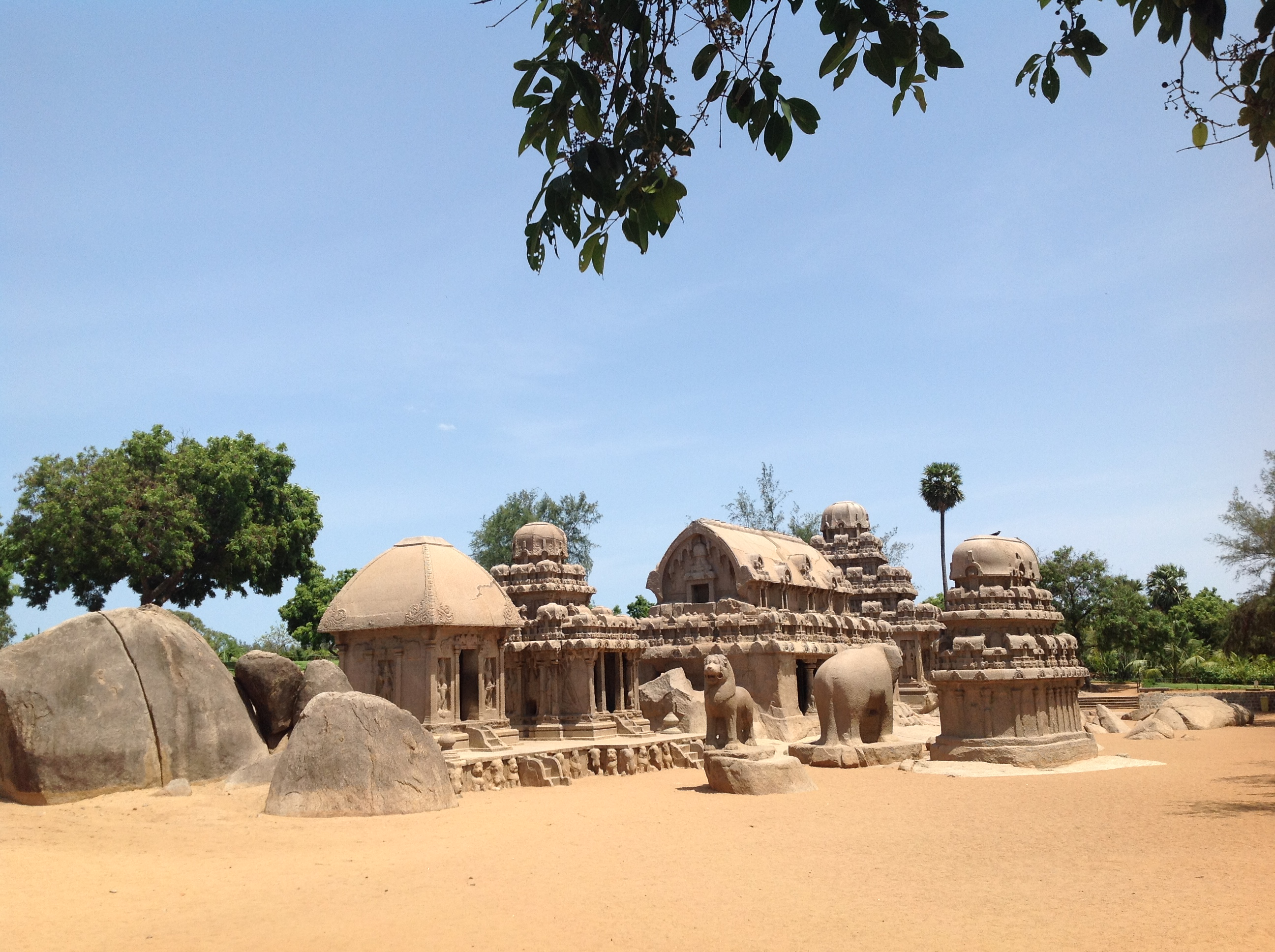
- Five Rathas of Mamallapuram (Mahabalipuram), 630–668 AD

- Location within Tamil Nadu Location within India
- Location: Mamallapuram, Chengalpattu district, Tamil Nadu, India
- Part of: Group of Monuments at Mahabalipuram
- Includes: Dharmaraja Ratha; Bhima Ratha; Arjuna Ratha; Nakula Sahadeva Ratha; Draupadi Ratha
- Criteria: Cultural: (i), (ii), (iii), (vi)
- Reference: 249-001
- Inscription: 1984 (8th Session)
- Coordinates: 12°36′31.7″N 80°11′22.6″E

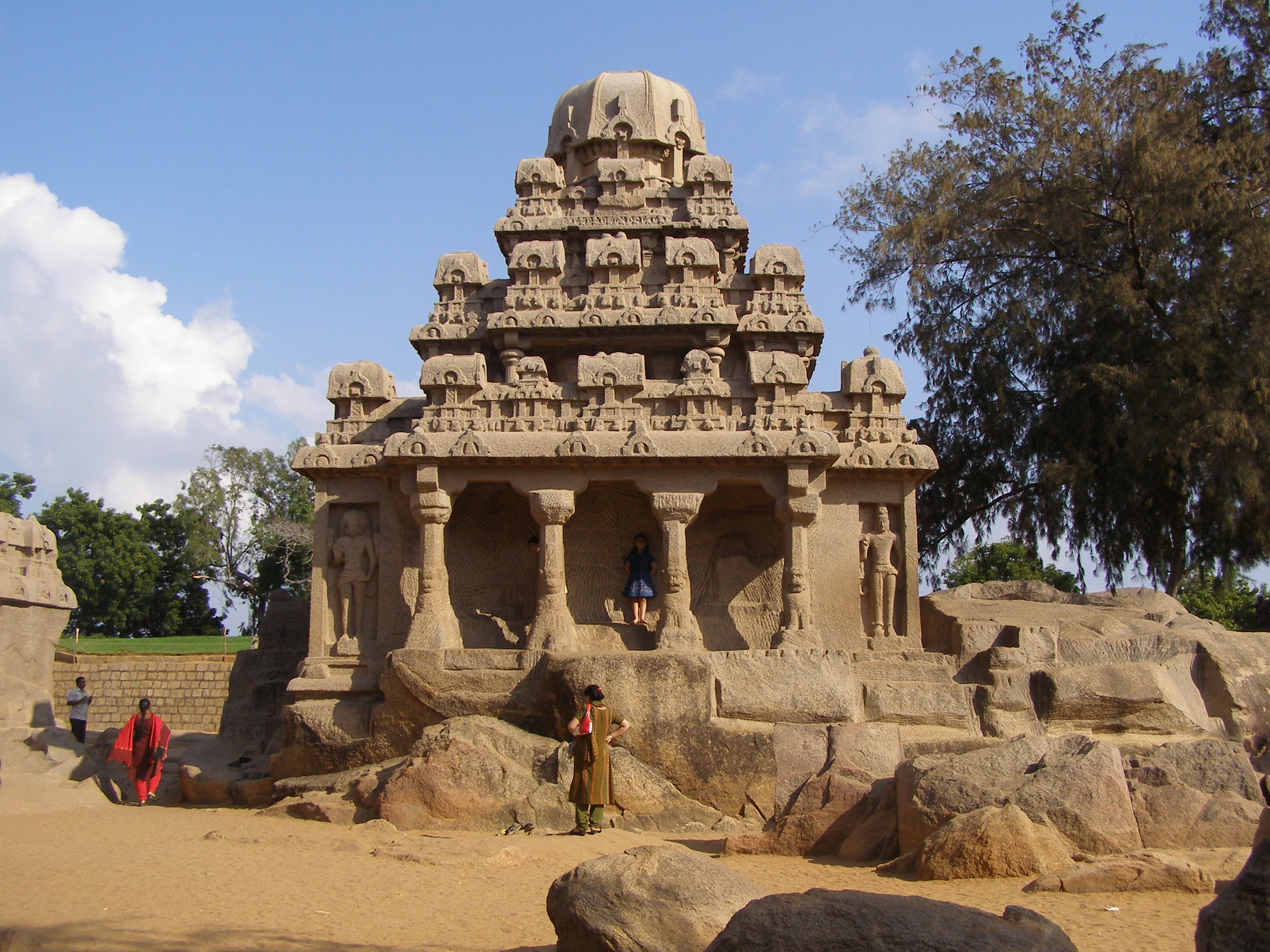
Dharmaraja Ratha

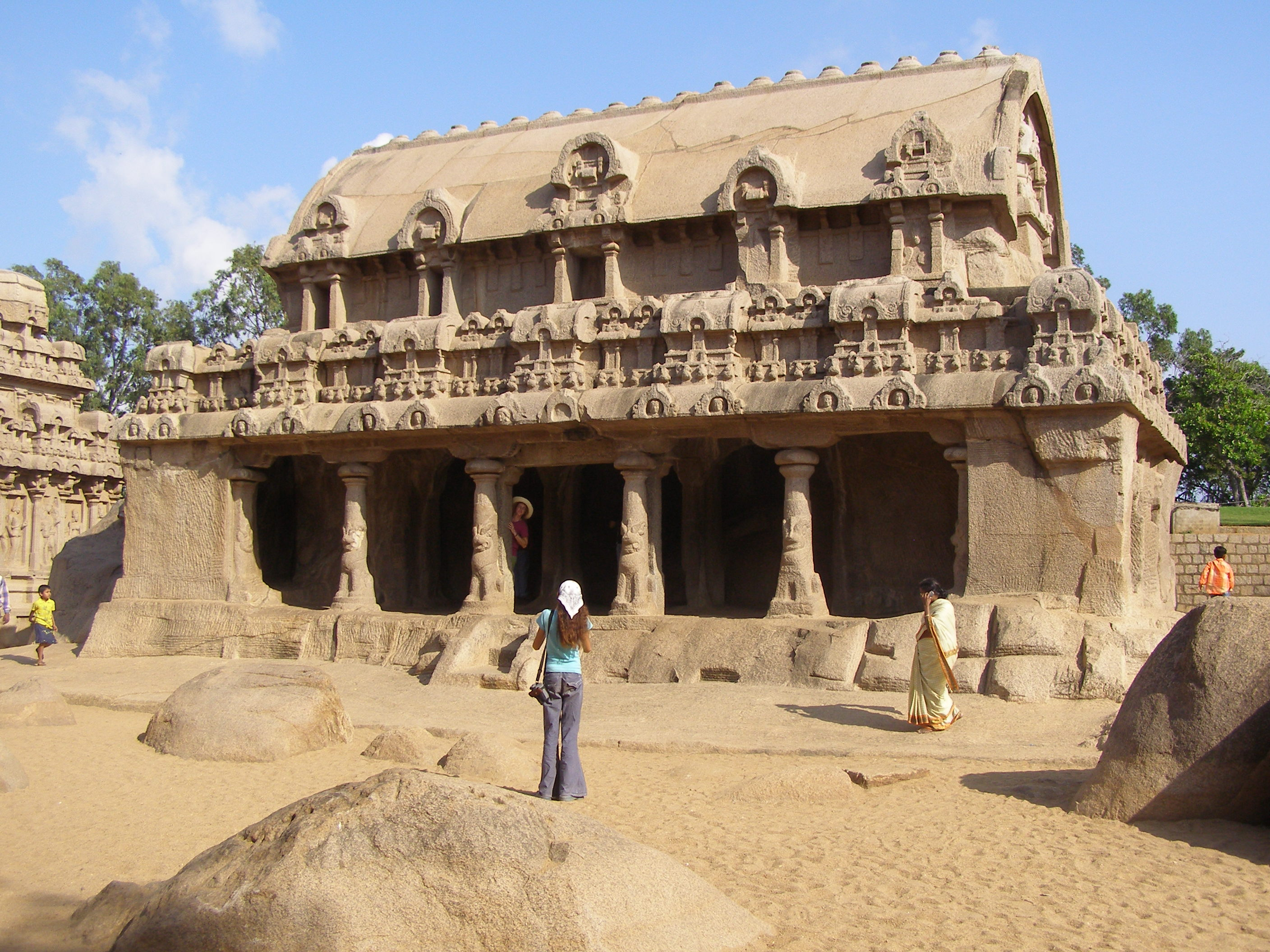
Bhima Ratha

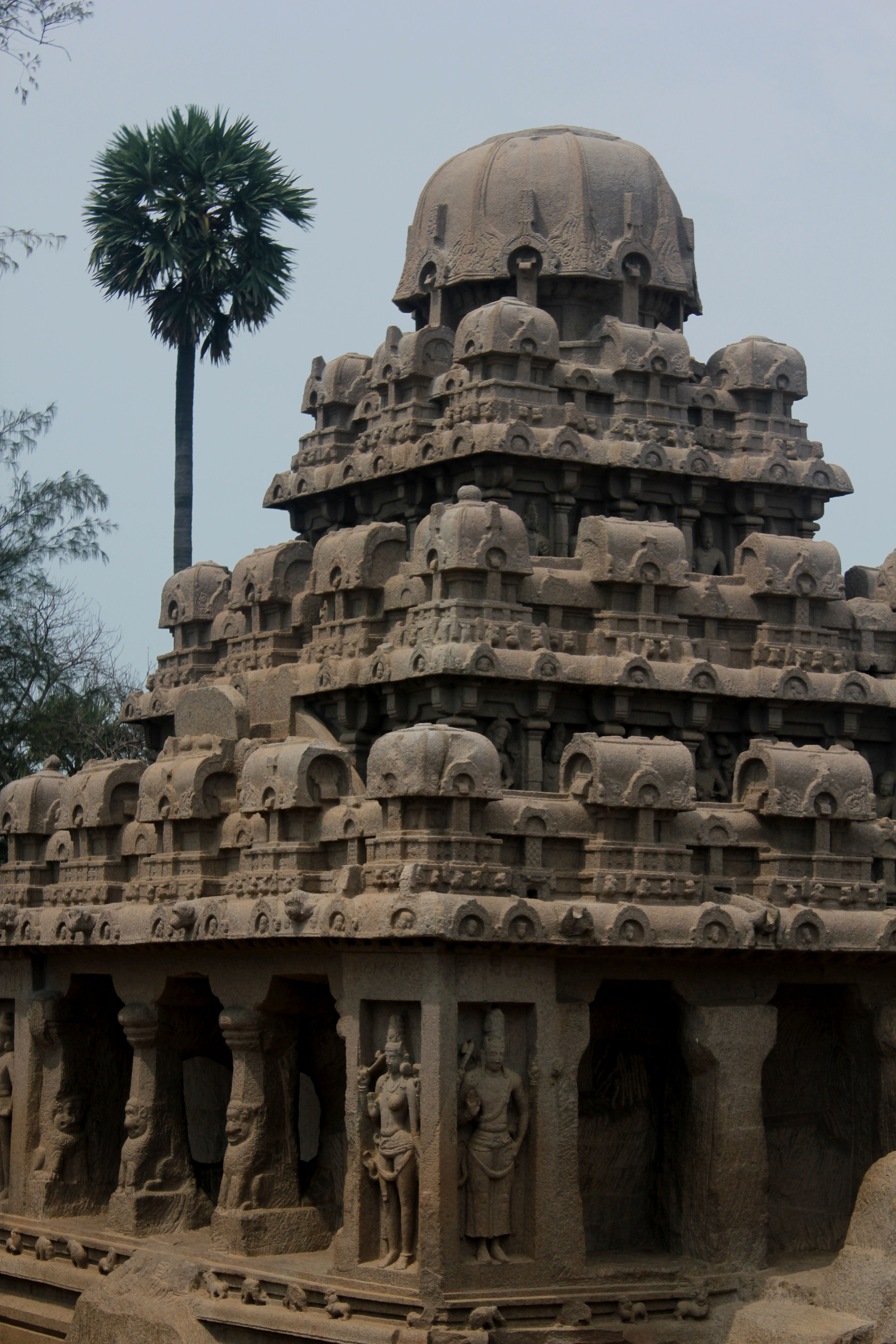
Arjuna Ratha

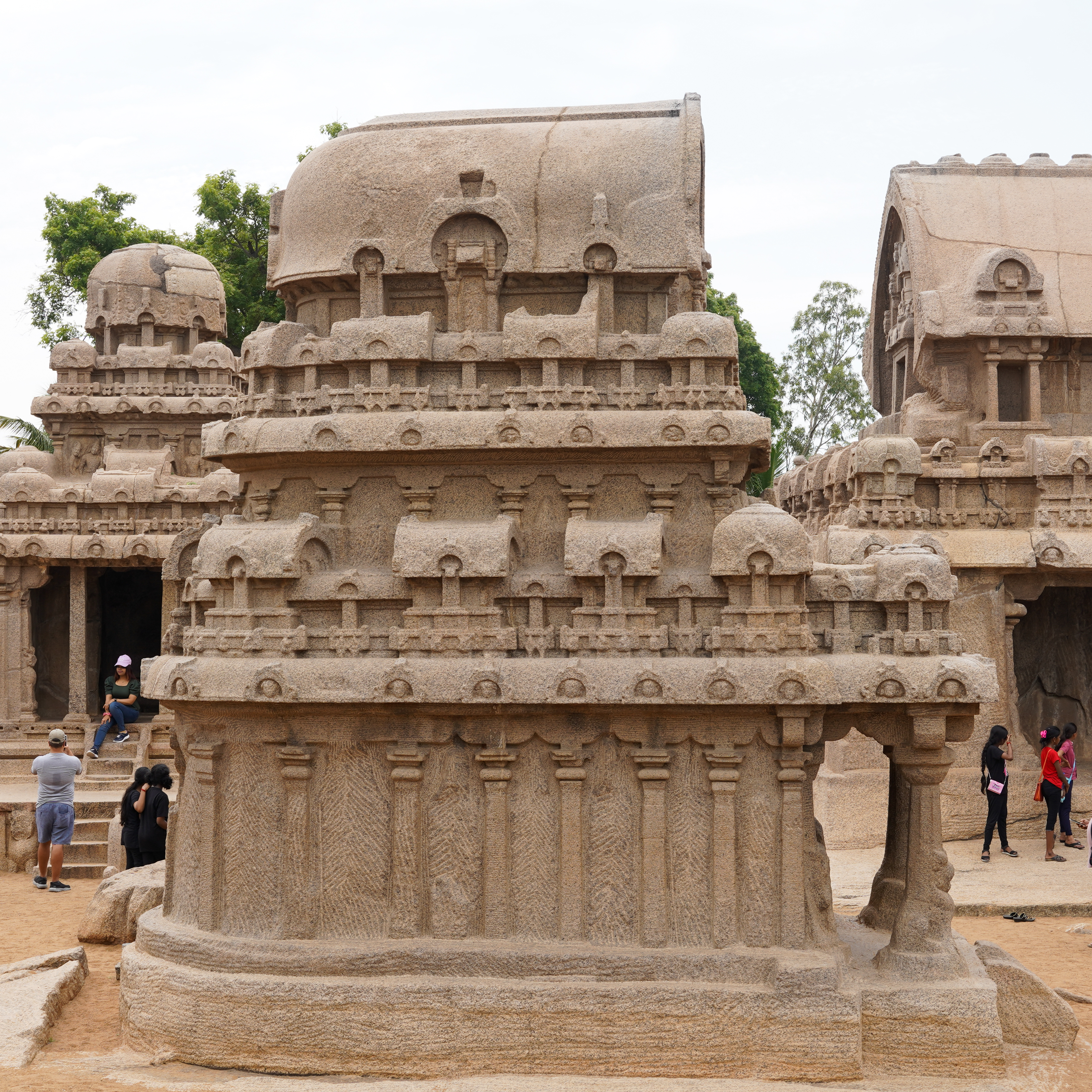
Nakula Sahadeva Ratha side view

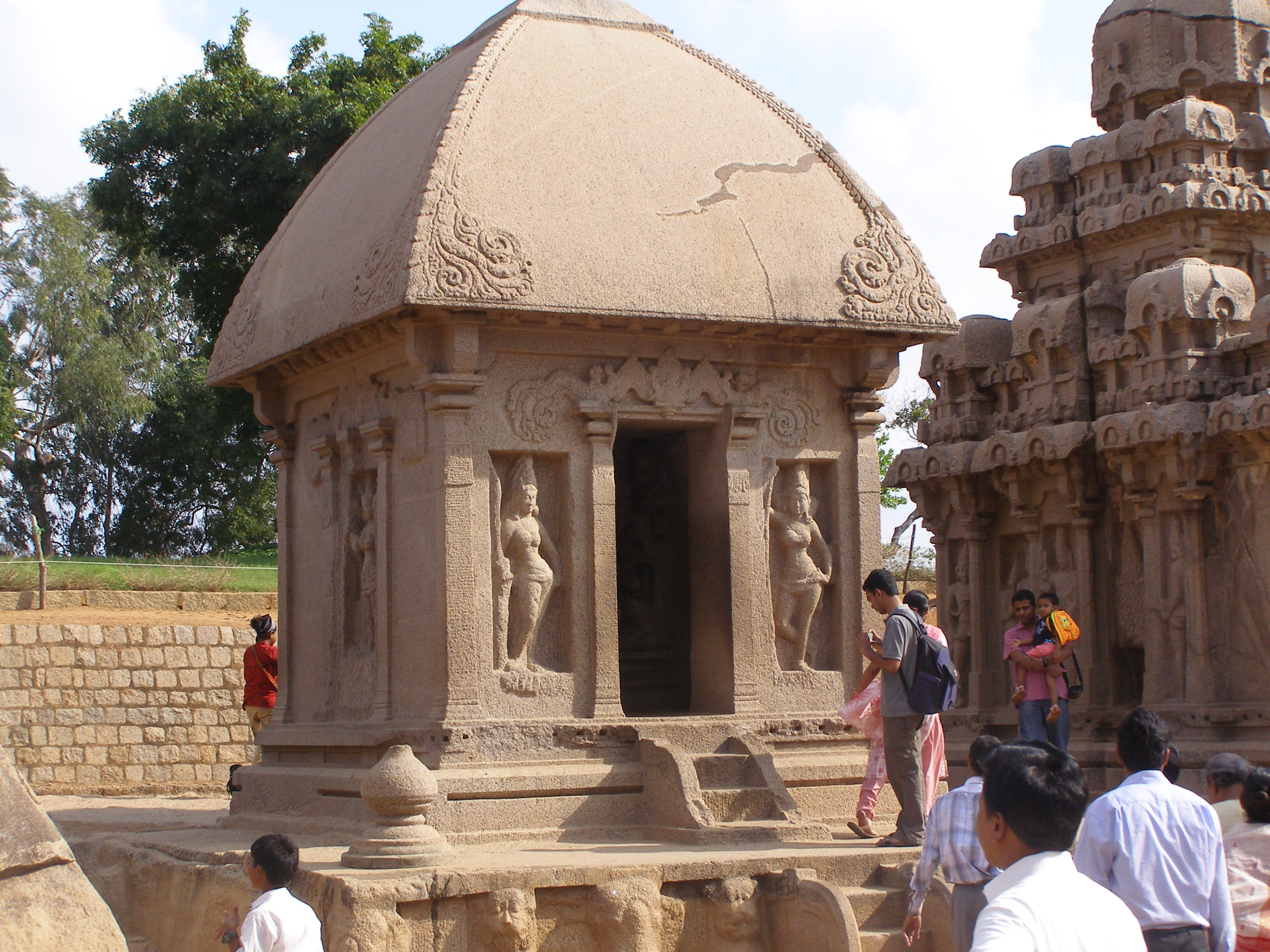
Draupadi Ratha

Pancha Rathas (also known as Five Rathas or Pandava Rathas or Ainthinai kovil) is a monument complex at Mahabalipuram, on the Coromandel Coast of the Bay of Bengal, in the Chengalpattu district of the state of Tamil Nadu, India. Pancha Rathas is an example of monolithic Indian rock-cut architecture. The complex was initially thought to have carved during the reign of King Narasimhavarman I (630–668 CE). However, historians such as Nagaswamy attributed all of monuments in Mahabalipuram to Narasimhavarman II (c. 690–725 CE) with the discovery of new inscriptions. The complex is under the auspices of the Archaeological Survey of India (ASI) and is part of the UNESCO World Heritage Site inscribed by UNESCO in 1984 as Group of Monuments at Mahabalipuram.

Each of the five monuments in the Pancha Rathas complex resembles a chariot (ratha), and each is carved over a single, long stone or monolith, of granite which slopes in north–south direction with a slight incline. Though sometimes mistakenly referred to as temples, the structures were never consecrated because they were never completed following the death of Narasimhavarman I. The structures are named after the Pancha Pandavas and their common wife Draupadi, of epic Mahabharata fame. In order of their size, they include the Dharmaraja Ratha, Bhima Ratha, Arjuna Ratha, Nakula Sahadeva Ratha, and Draupadi Ratha.

== Etymology ==
The monoliths are named after the Pandavas – Arjuna, Bhima, Yudhishthira ("Dharmaraja"), Nakula and Sahadeva – and Draupadi. These names are considered to be a misrepresentation as the structures have no link to the iconic characters of the Mahabharata epic. They have no religious significance either, as they remained unfinished and unconsecrated; the uncut rock parts at the base and top of the rathas are still visible. The ASI confirmed the unfinished nature of the structures and suggested that they instead be referred to as vimanas. However, the Pandava names have become permanent.

== History ==
According to a plaque displayed at the site by the ASI, the Pallava dynasty had planned the structures as models of chariots in rock based on prototypes of ancient rathas built in wood. The Pancha Rathas were carved during the reign of King Mahendravarman I and his son Narasimhavarman I. Work on these five rathas was discontinued following the death of Narasimha Varman in 668 AD. The purpose of their construction is not known as the structures were not completed. Part of the collection within the Group of Monuments at Mahabalipuram, they were classified as a UNESCO World Heritage Site in 1984.

== Geography ==
The site is located at Mahabalipuram (previously known as Mammallapuram), on the Coromandel Coast of the Bay of Bengal, in Kancheepuram district. It is approximately 35 miles (56 km) south of Chennai (previously known as Madras), the capital city, while Chengalpattu is about 20 miles (32 km) distant. The structures are part of the nine monolithic rock cut structures seen here.

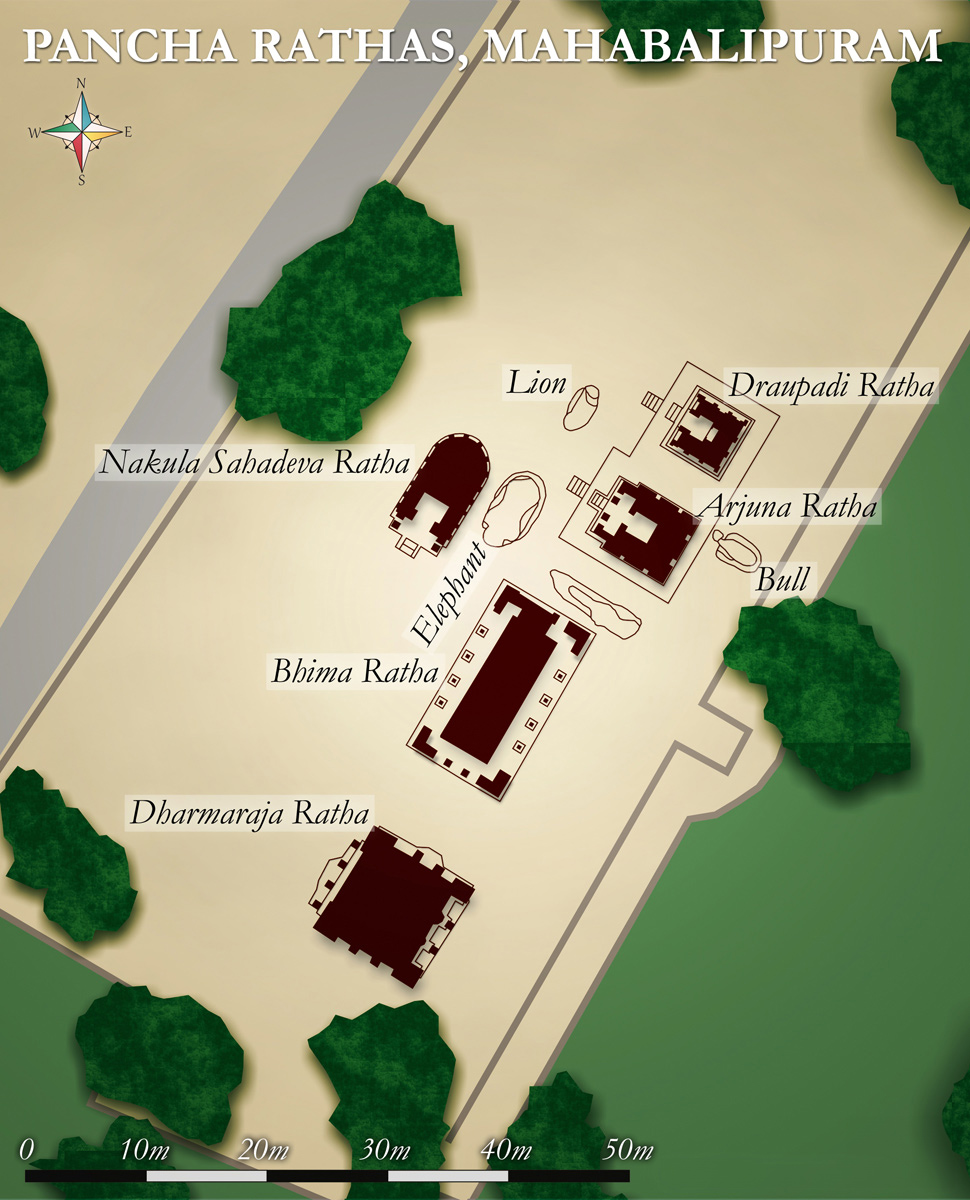
Layout plan of the rathas

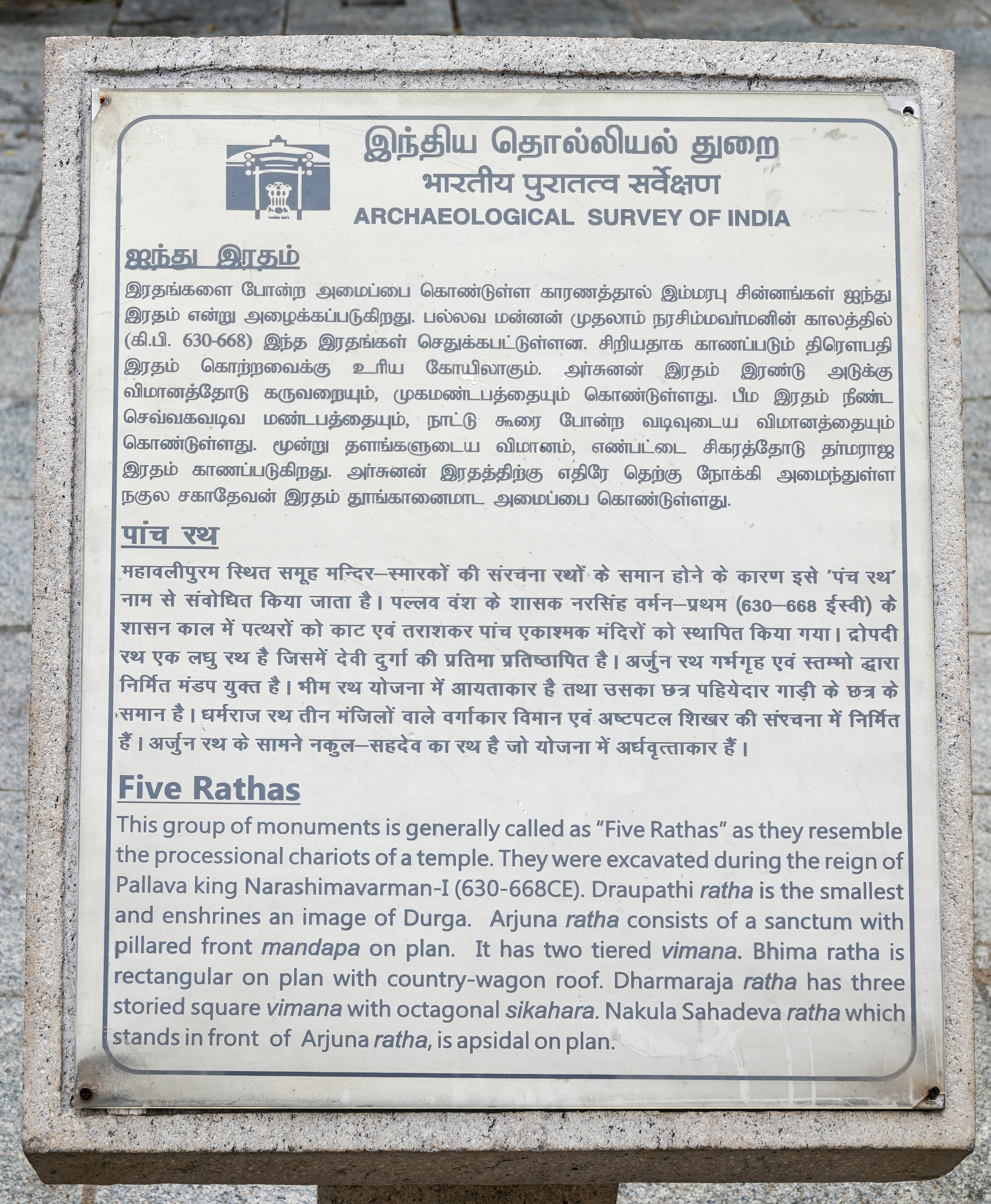
Info board, Archaeological Survey of India

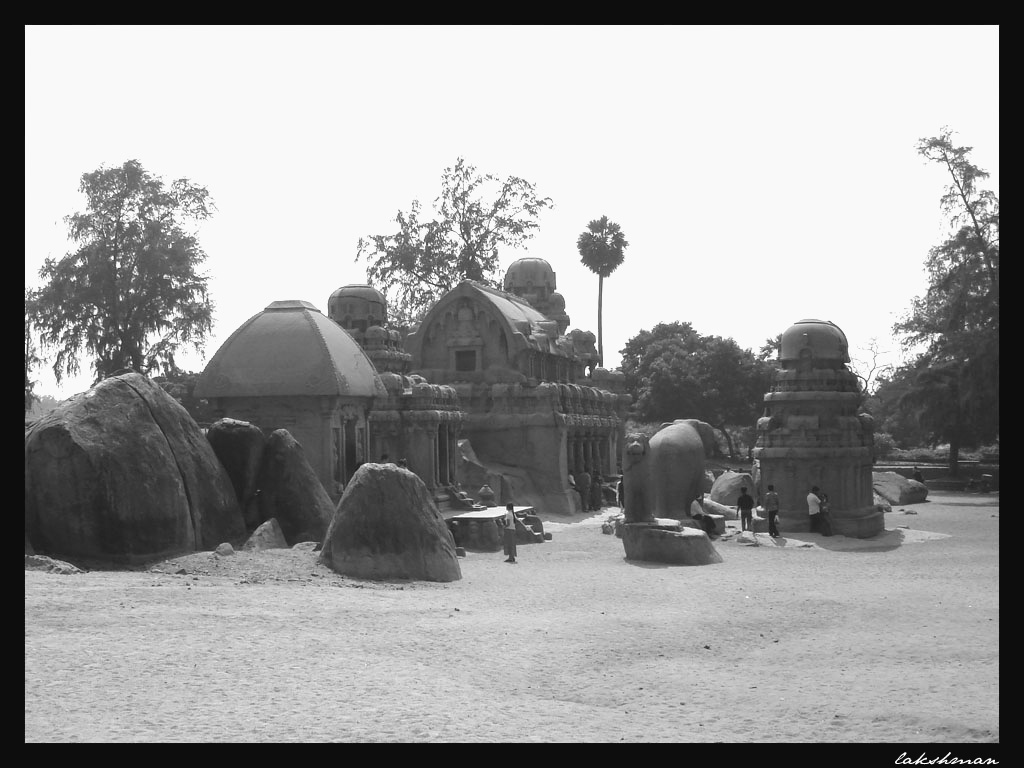
A complete view of Pancha Rathas in Mahabalipuram

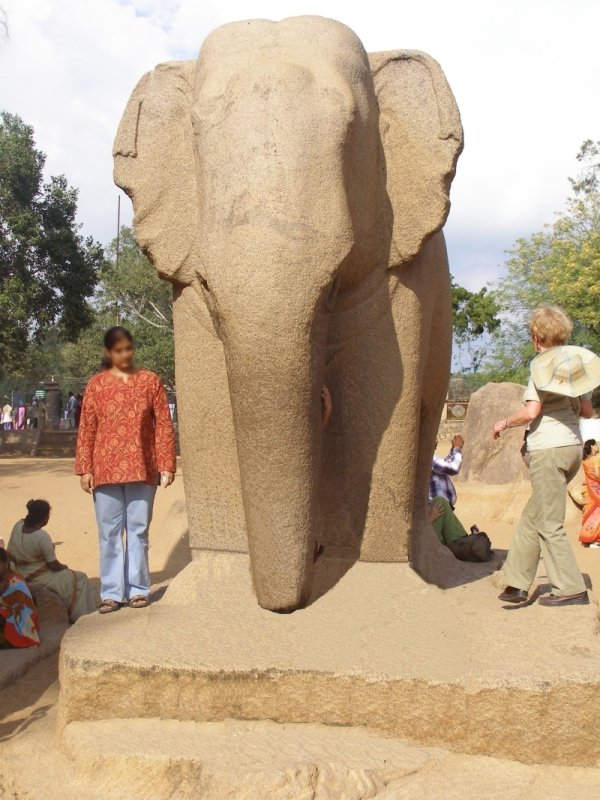
Elephant sculpture amongst the rathas

== Architecture ==
=== Layout ===
Each of the five rathas is a monolith, carved whole from a rock outcropping of pink granite. They are carved over a common mounted plinth which is north–south oriented with a slight slope. Each has a different layout, such as square, rectangular, or apsidal plans. The largest measures 42 by 35 feet (13 m × 11 m), and the tallest is 40 feet (12 m) high.

=== Representations ===
The Pancha rathas represent the diversity of Dravidian architecture of the time and it is likely that their original design traces back to wood constructions of temple chariots and were scale models or templates for much bigger temples built subsequently in Tamil Nadu. Most of the rathas are stated to be modelled on the Buddhist Viharas and Chaityas.

=== Design ===
The structural design and elevation are with towers or domes with single (ekathala) to triple (trithala) towers, which present a unique exhibition of South Indian Dravidian architecture. The chiseling done by the stone sculptors are occasional along joints between the stones. The walls are arranged and sequentially partitioned. The projections and recesses in these walls give the appearance of a set of shallow pilasters. The niches created in the walls are of rectangular shape and have carved sculptures of gods, demi-gods and the kings. The skirting around the images are of wild aquatic animals with "foliated tails and open jaws." The wall pilasters have curved brackets, and columns on the porch provide support to an overhanging eave; arch windows occasionally carved with images are located above them. The mouldings culminate in parapets. The carvings above the eave overhangs are decorated roof forms in miniature size, which are seen in rows all round each of the structure.

=== Preservation ===
The rathas have been preserved well on account of the sturdiness of their material, granite, and in spite of constant salty winds from the Bay of Bengal and catastrophic tsunamis in the 13th century AD and in 2004.

== Notable landmarks ==
The architectural elegance of the Dharmaraja Ratha is its pyramidal structure which rises in three steps. It is built with a square layout. Its composition has been accentuated with carvings of Hindu gods Harihara, Brahma, Skanda, Ardhanarishvara and King Narasimhavarman I. One of the distinctive carvings seen on the eastern face of the ratha is of Indra (a demi-god of rain and thunderstorms), seated on his mount Airavata (meaning: "a White Elephant"). There is also an independent monolithic stone sculpture of Nandi, adjoining this ratha in the open space. The next in order is the Arjuna Ratha, which is well decorated with an elegant façade and is akin to the Dharmaraja Ratha. Next in line is the Bhima Ratha built to a rectangular plan and with lion mounted columned (four columns) galleries on both long sides.

The Nakula Sahadeva Ratha is the next in line. It is built to a simple plan with no embellishing carvings in its apses. A stone monolithic sculpture of an elephant is fixed in the open space, next to this ratha. The Draupadi Ratha, which is the last in the line, is a square structure, which resembles a village hut with thatch roof. The fresco inside this shrine is of mother goddess Durga.

== Bibliography ==
- Michell, George (1977). The Hindu Temple: An Introduction to Its Meaning and Forms. University of Chicago Press. ISBN 978-0-226-53230-1.
