= Dharmaraja Ratha =

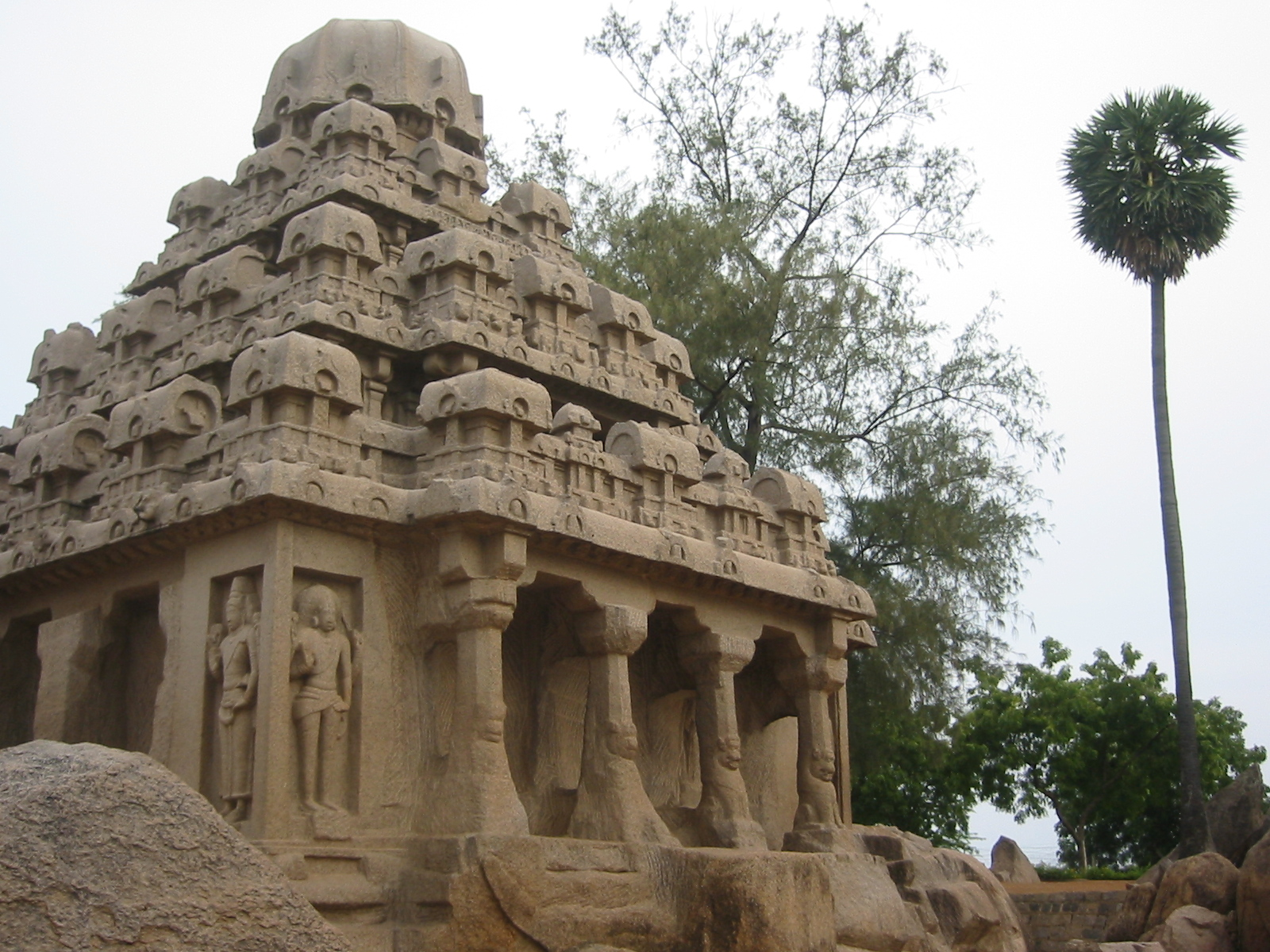
- Dharmaraja Ratha

Religion
- Affiliation: Hinduism
- District: Kancheepuram district
- Deity: Shiva

Location
- Location: Mahabalipuram
- State: Tamil Nadu,
- Country: India
- Interactive map of Dharmaraja Ratha

Architecture
- Completed: c. 650 Common era

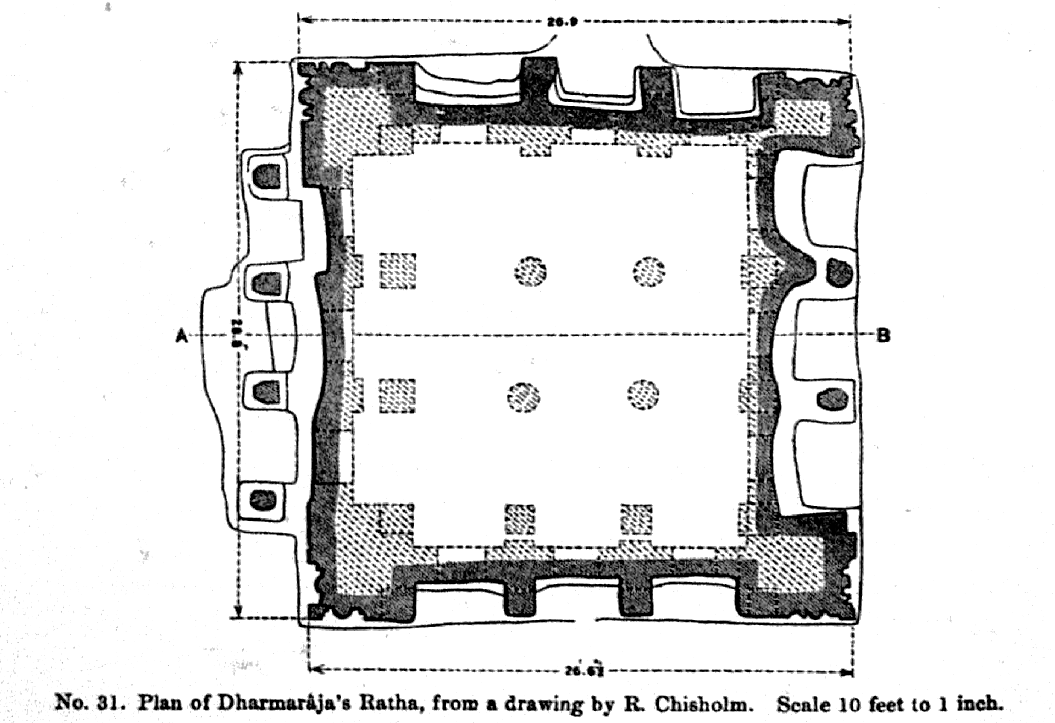
Plan of Dharmaraja's Ratha

Dharmaraja Ratha is a monument in the Pancha Rathas complex at Mahabalipuram, on the Coromandel Coast of the Bay of Bengal, in the Kancheepuram district of the state of Tamil Nadu, India. It is an example of monolith Indian rock-cut architecture. Dating from the late 7th century, it is attributed to the reign of King Mahendravarman I and his son Narasimhavarman I (630–680 AD; also called Mamalla, or "great warrior") of the Pallava Kingdom. The entire complex is under the auspices of the Archaeological Survey of India (ASI). It is one of the Group of Monuments at Mahabalipuram that were designated as a UNESCO World Heritage Site since 1984.

Resembling a chariot (ratha), it is carved out of a single, long stone of pink granite. Though sometimes mistakenly referred to as a temple, the structure was not consecrated because it was not completed following the death of Narasimhavarman I. The structure is named after the eldest of the Pancha Pandavas, of epic Mahabharata fame, though this nomenclature is not supported by its iconography. It is dedicated to Shiva.

== Geography ==
The structure is located at Mahabalipuram (previously known as Mammallapuram) on the Coromandel Coast of the Bay of Bengal in Kancheepuram district. It is approximately 35 miles (56 km) south of Chennai (previously known as Madras), the capital city, while Chengalpattu is about 20 miles (32 km) away.

== History ==
Like the other four Pancha Rathas, Dharmaraja ratha was built from stone, a replica of a wooden version which preceded it. Though the temple is named after the first of Pandava princes from Mahabharatha, there is no history to ascertain the name. The temple was left incomplete and consecration was not performed due to the death of the king Narasimhavarman I. Historians assign the date of construction to the period of two Pallava kings Narasimhavarman I (690-725) and Parameswaravarman I. The inscriptions of Parameswaravarman I are seen in the temple.

== Architecture ==
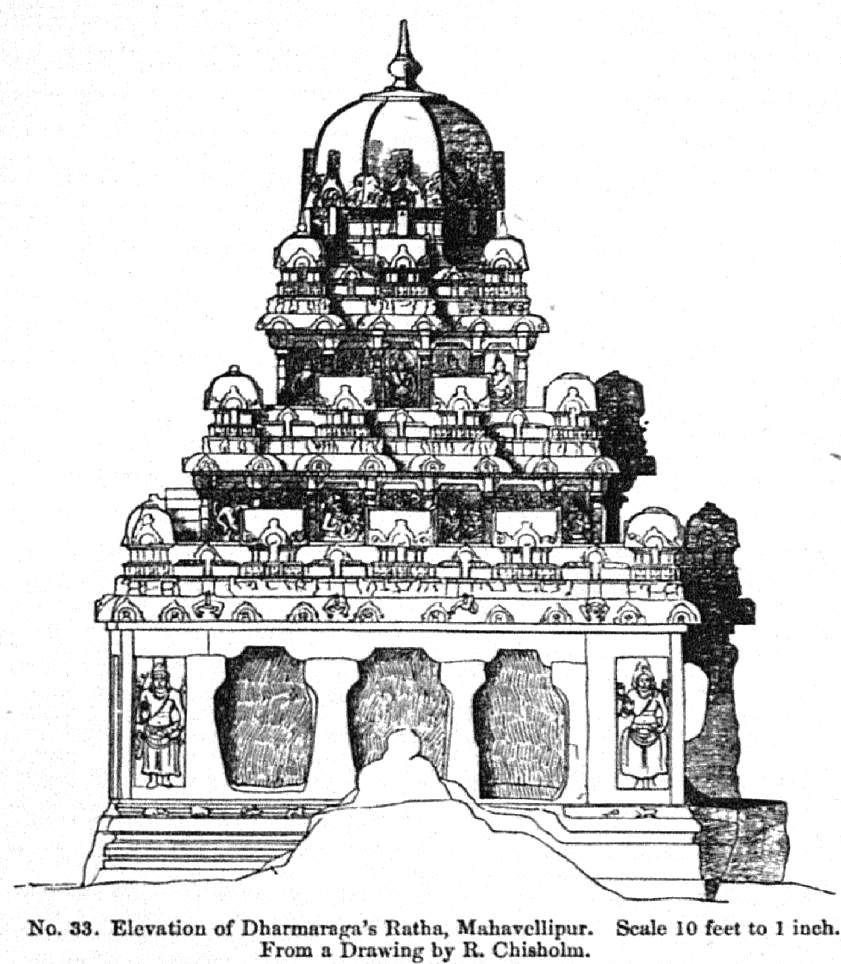
Elevation of Dharmaraja's Ratha

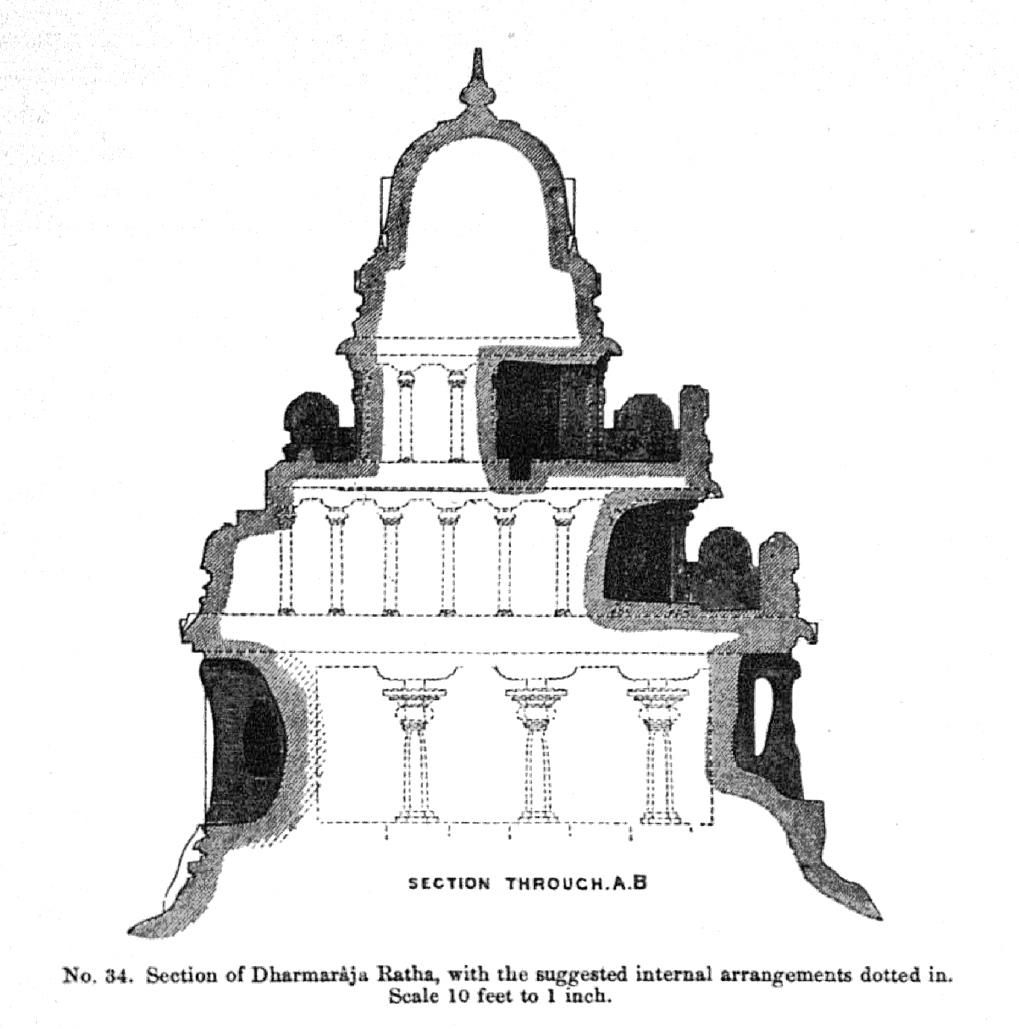
Section of Dharmaraja's Ratha

All the Pancha Rathas are aligned in a north–south direction and share a common plinth. They have no precedent in Indian architecture and have proved to be "templates" for building larger temples in both the South Indian tradition of Dravidian temple architecture, Central Indian tradition of Vesara temple architecture and North Indian tradition of Nagara temple architecture . Though cut out of monolithic rocks, they are carved in the form of structural temples in regular building form and hence termed as "quasimonolithic temple form.

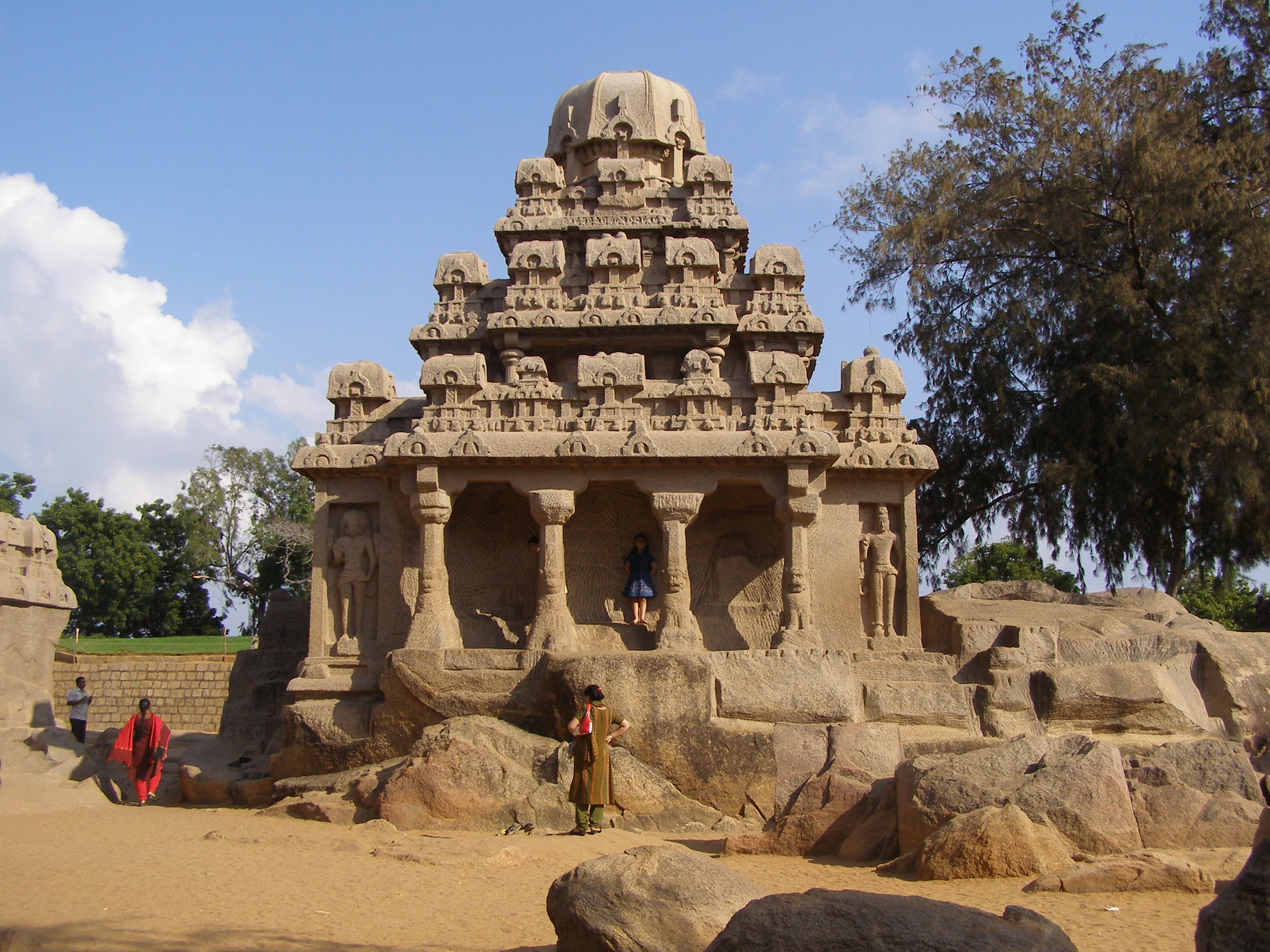
Full reflection of the architectural complexity of the Dharmaraja Ratha

Dharmaraja Ratha is the most prominent architecturally of the five rathas and also the tallest and largest. The ratha faces west and is sculpturally very rich. It has three floors including the ground floor. The plan of the ground floor measure a square of 28 feet (8.5 m) and has a height of 35 feet (11 m) from ground level to the top of the roof. It is open on all four sides and the facade on all sides are supported by two pillars and two pilasters with the corners forming an integral part of the support system for the upper floors. Carved out from a single rock of pink granite, along with other three rathas on a single block of stone oriented in a north–south direction, it is a trithala or three-story vimana, square in plan, with open porches and a terraced pyramidal tower. and an octagonal shikhara (pinnacle) at the top. Small-sized model shrines called kudus make up the ornament of the upper part of the tower. There are many sculptures on the corners of the sanctum, which depict Shiva; Harihara, Brahma-Sasta, Skanda, Brahma, Ardhanarisvara (half Shiva half Parvati) and Krishna are depicted alongside an inscribed portrait of a king, indicated to be Narasimhavarman I, who commissioned the temple. The shafts of the pillars are supported by seated lions.

The first floor contains twenty niches containing the images of Kankalamurthi, Vinadhara, dancing Shiva, Shiva with Candesha, Gangadhara, Vishnu, Kalari, Vrashabtikamurthi, Andhakasuramurthi, Krishna with figurines of women with offerings, Dvarapalas and priests of the temple. The second floor contains rich imagery, with further depictions of Shiva as Gangadara and Natesa, and Vishnu resting on Garuda and Kaliya Mardhana. The second level contains a cell with the earliest of inscription of Somaskanda.

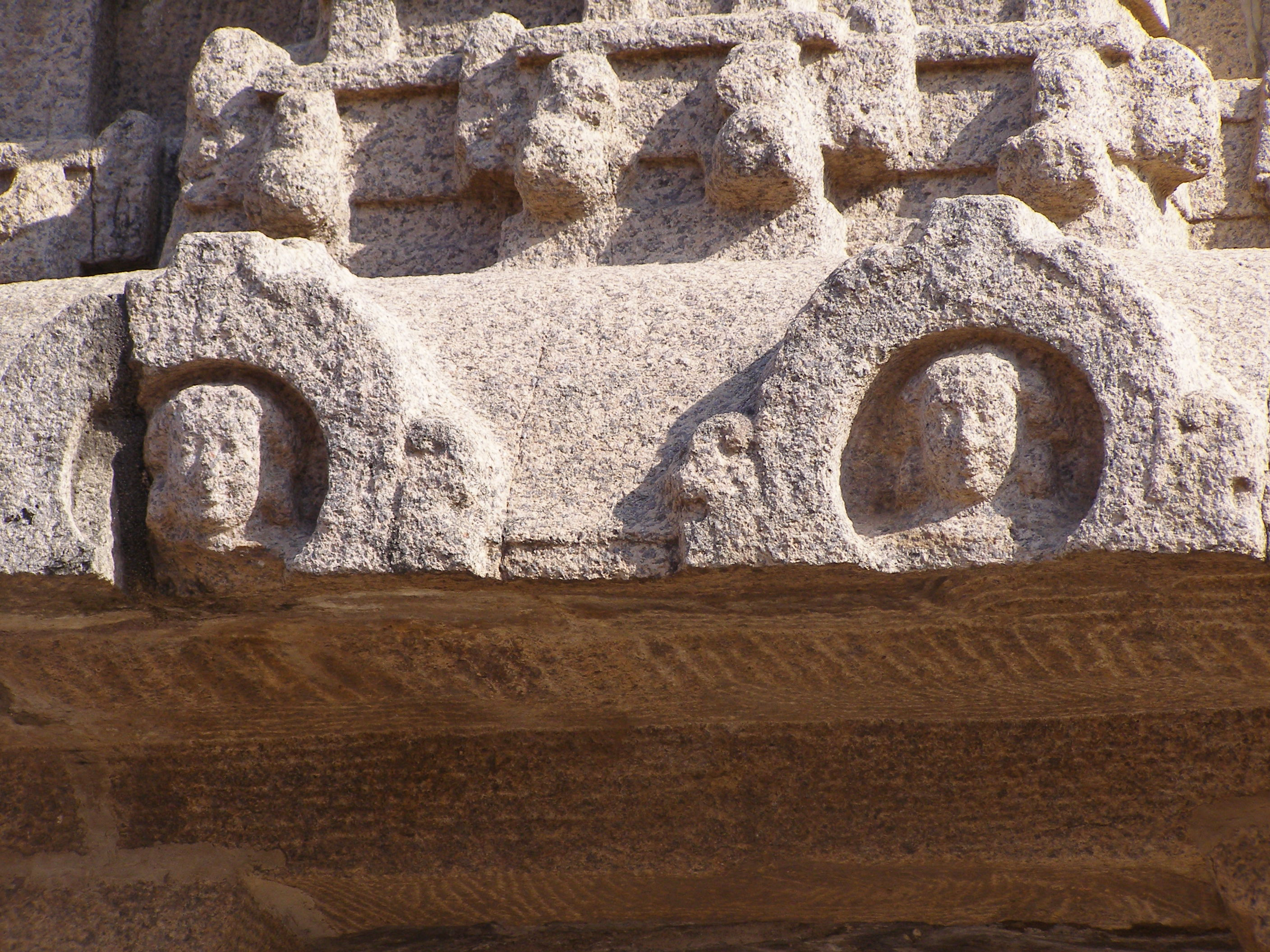
Kudus (Horse-shoe shaped dormer windows) depicted on all side along the cornices

=== Inscriptions ===
On the Dharmaraja Rathas there are 16 inscriptions in Grantha and Nagari scripts in Sanskrit inscriptions on which are royal cognomen, single-word titles, most of them are attributed to Narasimhavarman I. On the top tier of the temple is an inscription which refers to it as Atyantakama Pallavesvaram; Atyantakama was one of the known titles of Paramesvaravarman I. Other inscribed titles for the king are Shri Megha and Trailokiya–vardhana-vidhi.
