= Volante =

Volante (meaning "flying" and "steering wheel" in several languages) may refer to:

- Volante (carriage), two-wheeled carriage
- Volante, a racehorse, the 1885 American Derby winner
- The Volante, newspaper of the University of South Dakota, United States, since 1887
- The midfielder position in association football (Volante means defensive midfielder in Brazilian language but midfielder elsewhere in Latin America)
- Former Brazilian soldiers combatting cangaceiros
- Reparto volanti or Squadra volante, "flying squad" of the Italian State Police

== People with the name Volante ==
- Carlos Volante (born 1905), Argentinian footballer

== See also ==
- Aston Martin Volante, type of car
- The Volante Handicap, American horse race established 1969
- Disco Volante (disambiguation)
- Papel volante, Portuguese popular literature
- Squadrone Volante, 17th-century "flying squad"
