= Ratha =

Indo-Iranian term for a spoked-wheel chariot

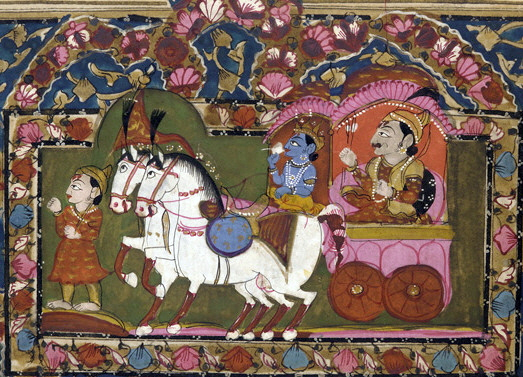
Krishna, Arjuna at Kurukshetra, 18th- to 19th-century painting.

Ratha (Proto-Indo-Iranian: *Hrátʰas, Vedic Sanskrit: रथ, IAST: rátha; Avestan: raθa) is the Indo-Iranian term for a spoked-wheel chariot. The term has been used since antiquity for both fast chariots and other wheeled vehicles pulled by animals or humans, in particular the large temple cars or processional carts still used in Indian religious processions to carry images of a deity.

== Harappan Civilisation ==
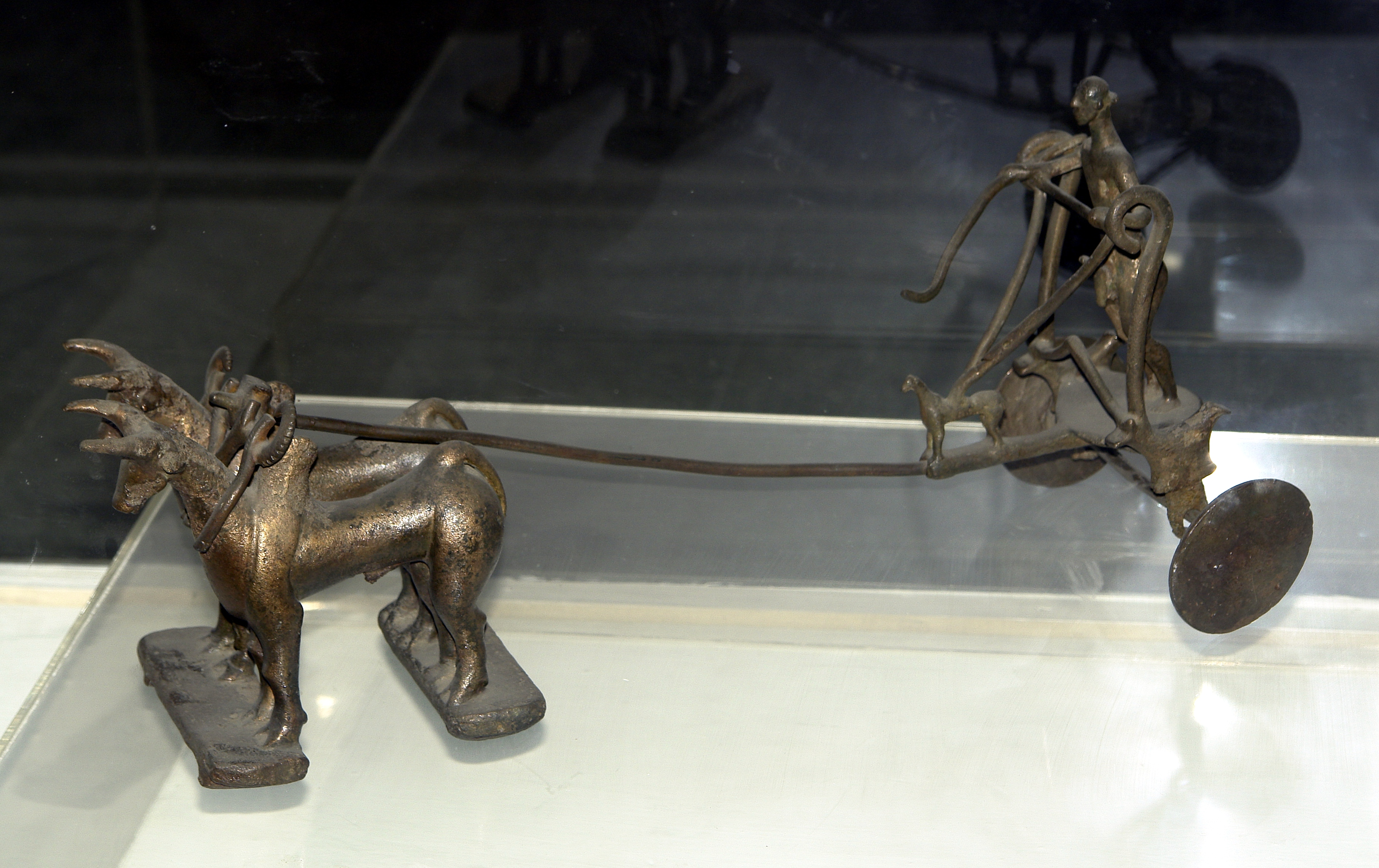

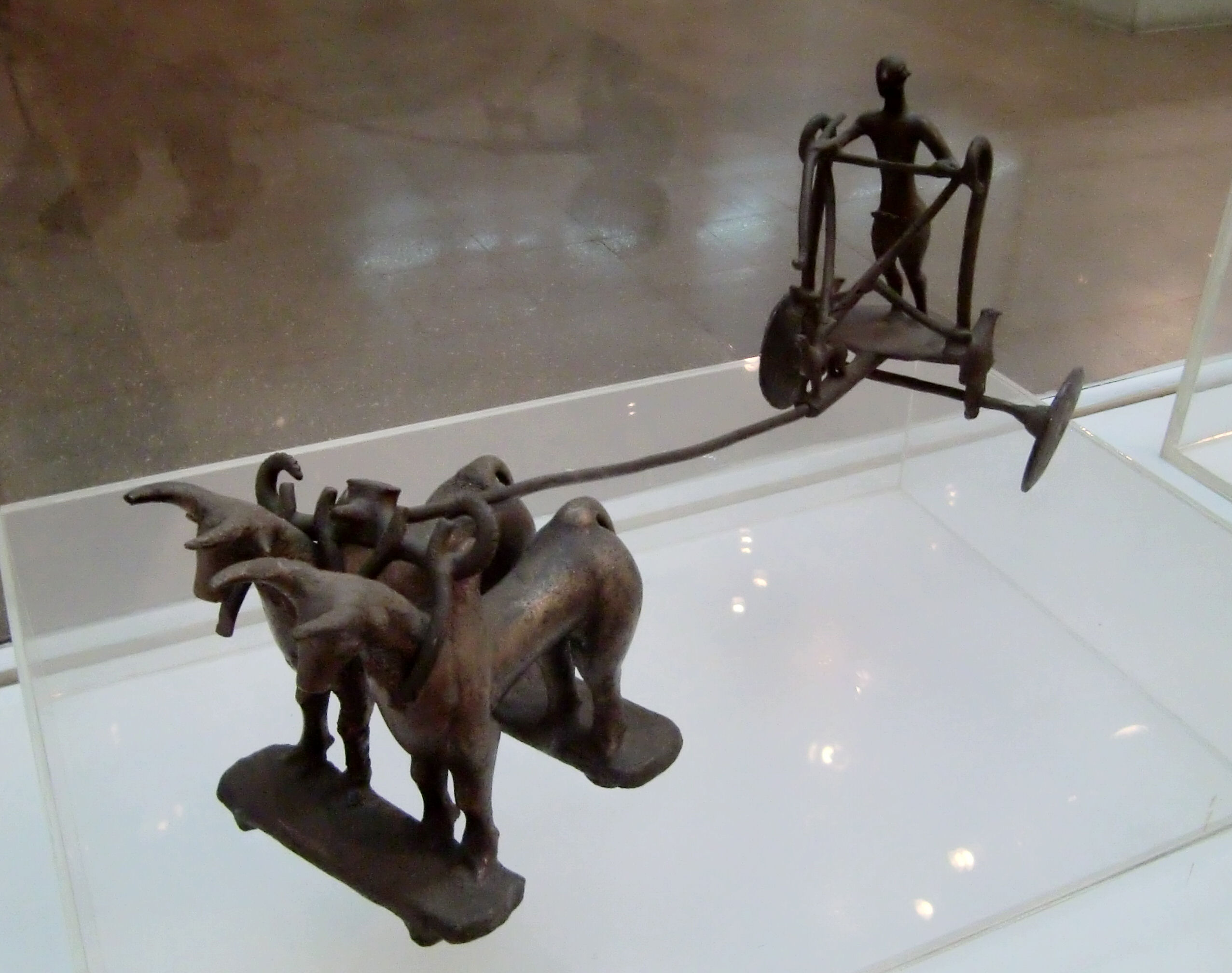
Copper sculpture of a bull-cart and rider, from a hoard at Daimabad, Maharashtra - Late Harappan, c2000 BCE

At the Indus Valley Civilization sites of Daimabad and Harappa in the Indian subcontinent, there is evidence for the use of terracotta model carts as early as 3500 BC during the Ravi Phase. There is evidence of wheeled vehicles (especially miniature models) in the Indus Valley Civilization, but not of chariots. According to Kenoyer,

During the Harappan Period (Harappa Phase, 2600–1900 BC) there was a dramatic increase in the terracotta cart and wheel types at Harappa and other sites throughout the Indus region. The diversity in carts and wheels, including depictions of what may be spoked wheels, during this period of urban expansion and trade may reflect different functional needs, as well as stylistic and cultural preferences. The unique fonts and the early appearance of carts in the Indus valley region suggest that they are the result of indigenous technological development and not diffusion from West Asia or Central Asia as proposed by earlier scholars.

The earliest Copper-Bronze Age carts remains that have been found at Sinauli have been dated to 1900 BCE, which were interpreted by some as horse-pulled "chariots", predating the arrival of the horse-centred Indo-Aryans. Others object, noting that solid wheels belong to carts, not chariots. The late Harappan site of Pirak, Pakistan, has to date offered the earliest evidence of true horses in South Asia, from c. 1700 BC.

== Indo-Aryans ==
=== Proto-Indo-Iranians ===
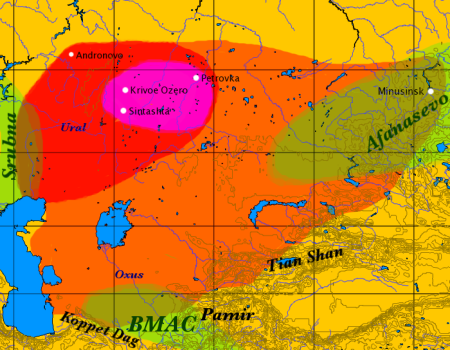
The area of the spoke-wheeled chariot finds within the Sintashta-Petrovka culture is indicated in purple.

Horse-drawn chariots, as well as its cult and associated rituals, were spread by the Indo-Iranians, and horses and horse-drawn chariots were introduced in India by the Indo-Aryans. (Note: According to Raulwing, the chariot must not necessarily be regarded as a marker for Indo-European or Indo-Iranian presence. According to Raulwing, it is an undeniable fact that only comparative Indo-European linguistics is able to furnish the methodological basics of the hypothesis of a "PIE chariot", in other words: "Ausserhalb der Sprachwissenschaft winkt keine Rettung! ")

The earliest evidence for chariots in southern Central Asia (on the Oxus river) dates to the Achaemenid period (apart from chariots harnessed by oxen, as seen on petroglyphs). No Andronovian chariot burial has been found south of the Oxus.

=== Textual evidence ===
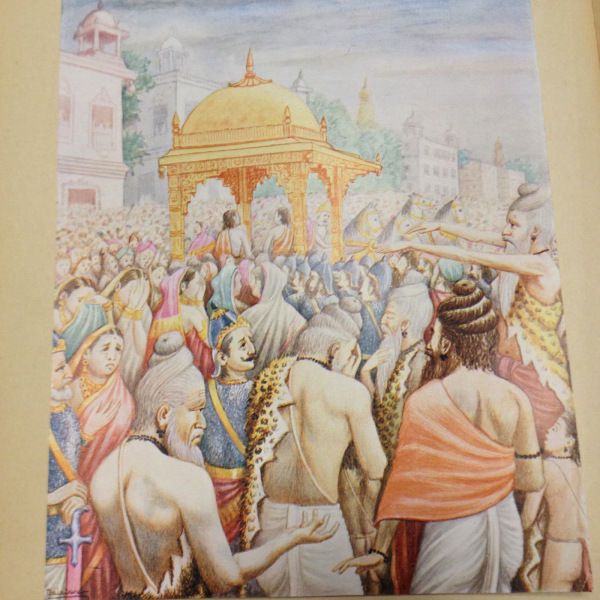
Rama goes to the forest on a ratha.

Chariots figure prominently in the Rigveda, evidencing their presence in India in the 2nd millennium BCE. Notably, the Rigveda differentiates between the Ratha (chariot) and the Anas (often translated as "cart"). Rigvedic chariots are described as made of the wood of salmali (Bombax ceiba; RV 10.85.20), Khadira and Simsapa (RV 3.53.19) trees. While the number of wheels varies, chariot measurements for each configuration are found in the Shulba Sutras.

Chariots also feature prominently in later texts, including the other Vedas, the Puranas and the great epics of the Ramayana and Mahabharata. Indeed, most Hindu deities are portrayed as riding them. Among Rigvedic deities, notably Ushas "Dawn" rides in a chariot, as well as Agni in his function as a messenger between gods and men. In RV 6.61.13, the Sarasvati River is described as being wide and speedy like a chariot.

=== Remains ===
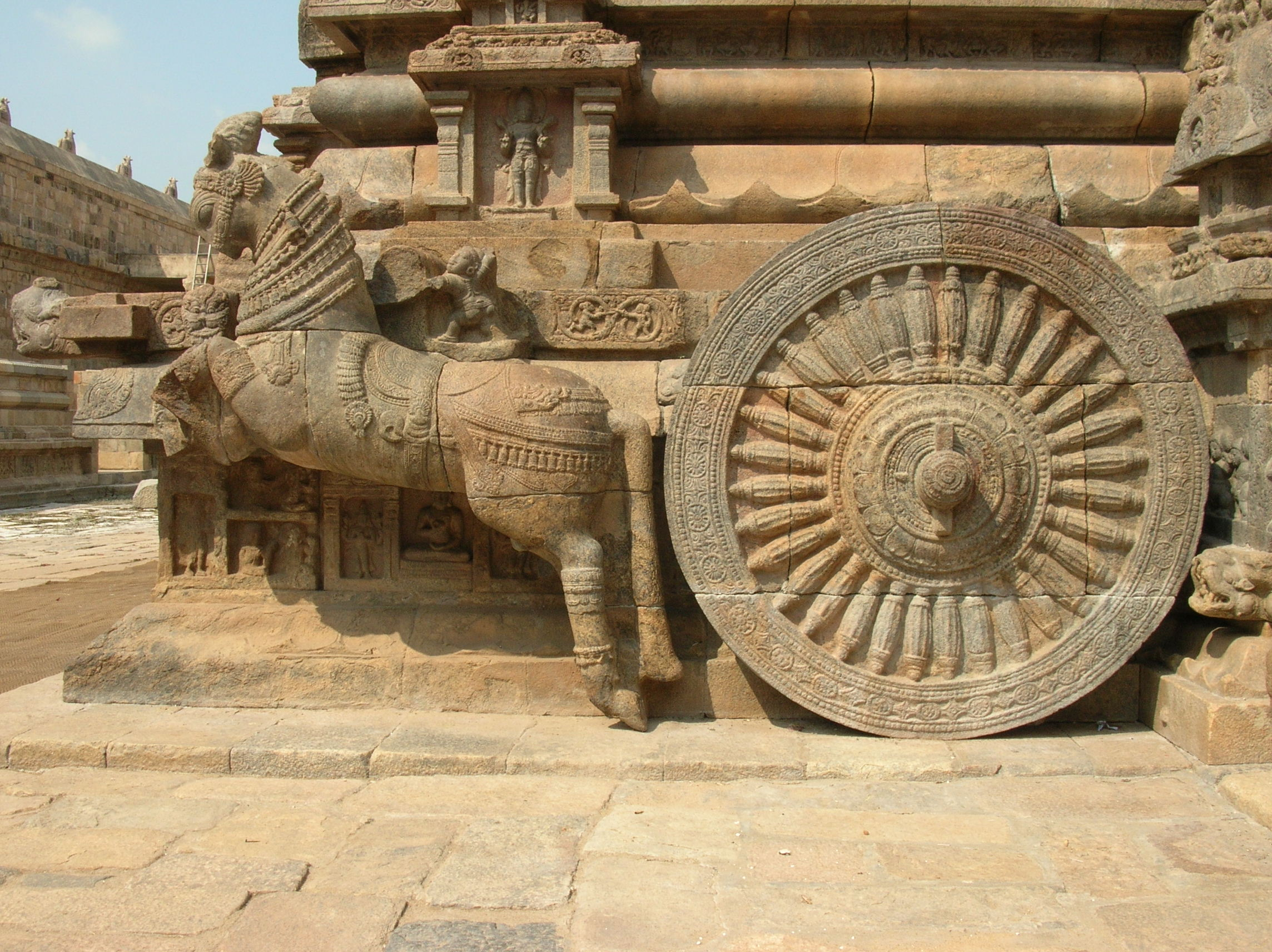
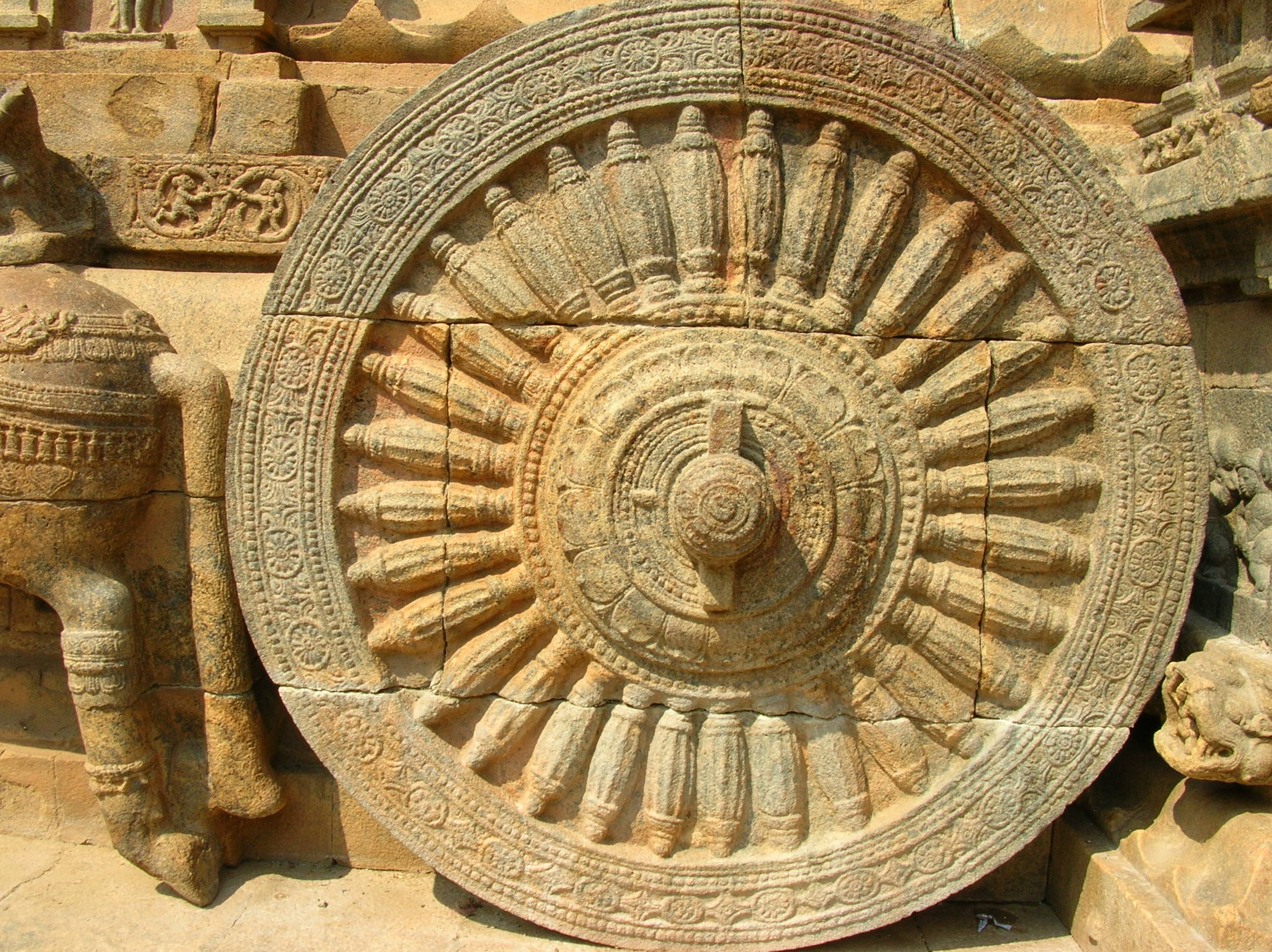
Horse-drawn chariot carved onto the mandapam of Airavateswarar temple, Darasuram (left), c. 12th century CE.

There are a few depictions of chariots among the petroglyphs in the sandstone of the Vindhya Range. Two depictions of chariots are found in Morhana Pahar, Mirzapur . One shows a team of two horses, with the head of a single driver visible. The other one is drawn by four horses, has six-spoked wheels, and shows a driver standing up in a large chariot box. This chariot is being attacked, with a figure wielding a shield and a mace standing at its path, and another figure armed with a bow and arrow threatening its right flank. It has been suggested (Sparreboom 1985:87) that the drawings record a story, most probably dating to the early centuries BC, from some center in the area of the Ganges–Yamuna plain into the territory of still neolithic hunting tribes. The drawings would then be a representation of foreign technology, comparable to the Arnhem Land Aboriginal rock paintings depicting Westerners. The very realistic chariots carved into the Sanchi stupas are dated to roughly the 1st century BCE.

== In Hindu temple festivals ==
Ratha or Rath also means a large, often very large, wheeled cart made of wood, on which the murti of a deity is carried in religious processions, some of which are very important festivals. The Ratha may be pulled by devotees with rope, or pulled by horses or elephants. Rathas are used mostly by the Hindu temples of South India for Rathoutsava (Temple car festival). During the festival, the temple deities are driven through the streets, accompanied by the chanting of mantra, shloka or bhajan.

Ratha Yatra is a huge Hindu festival associated with Lord Jagannath held at Puri in the Indian state of Odisha during the months of June or July.

Ratha or chariots

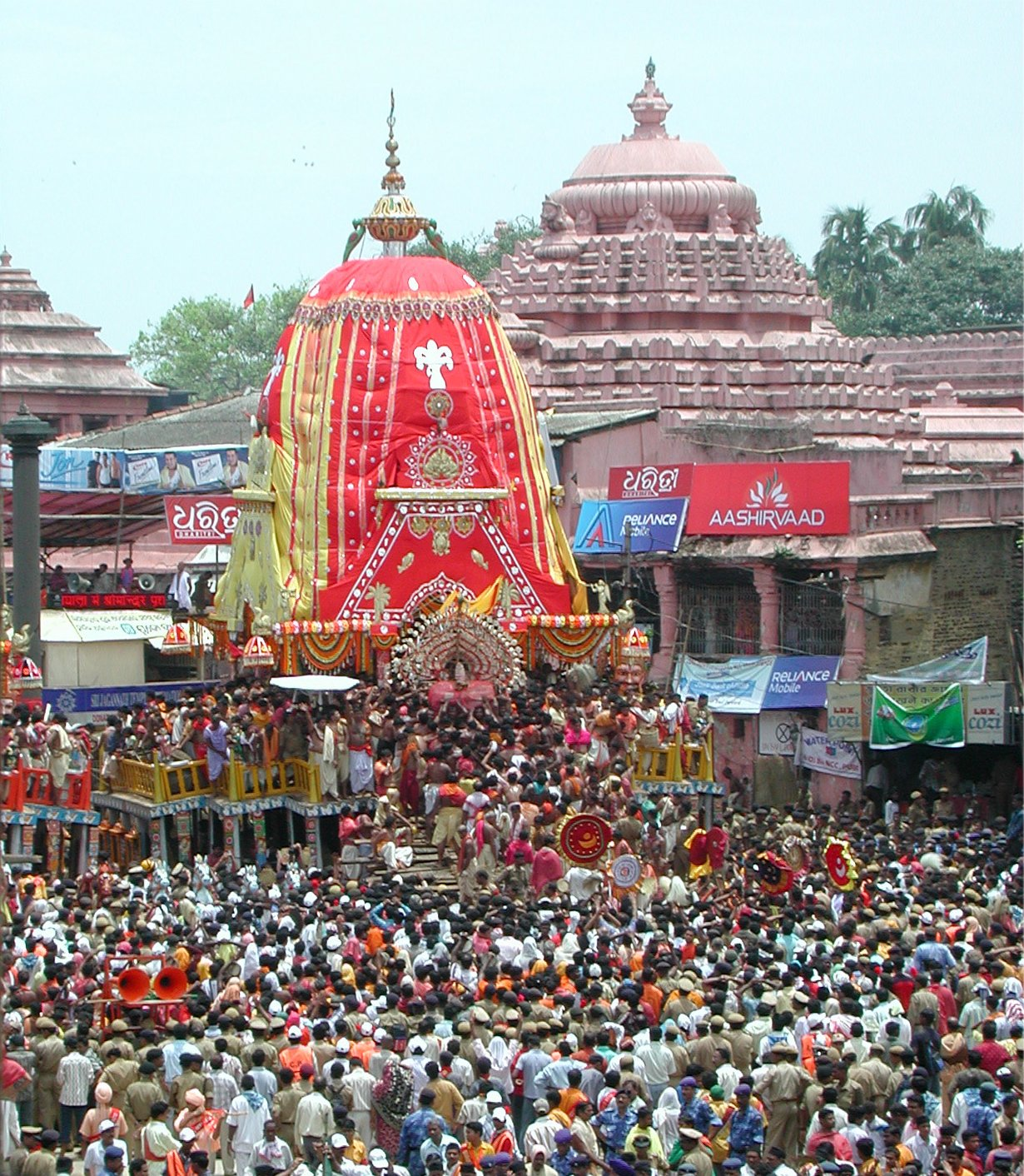
The Rath Jatra in the Grand Avenue at the Jagannath Temple, Puri, 2007.

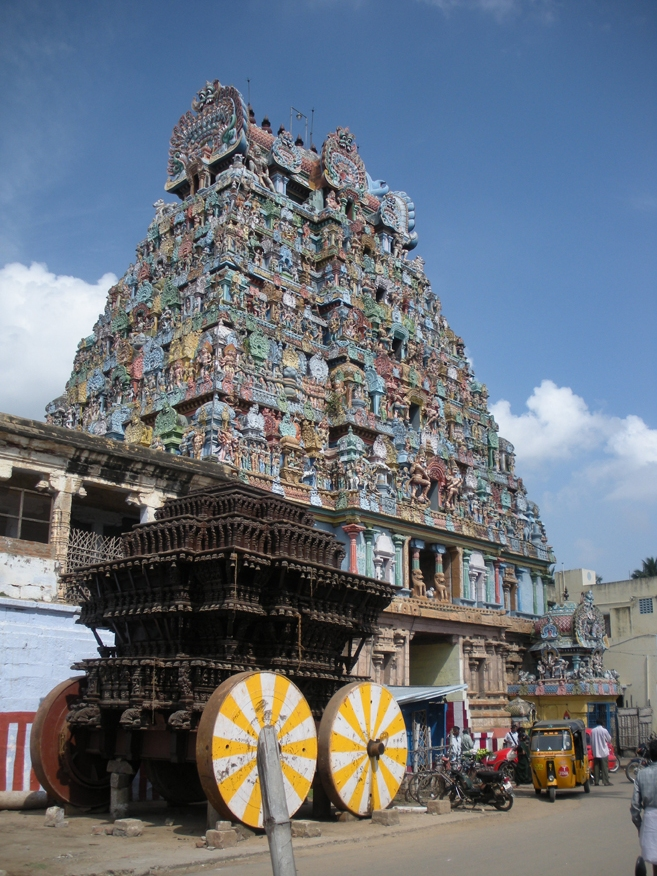
The Towering Rajagopuram with one of the Temple Rathas

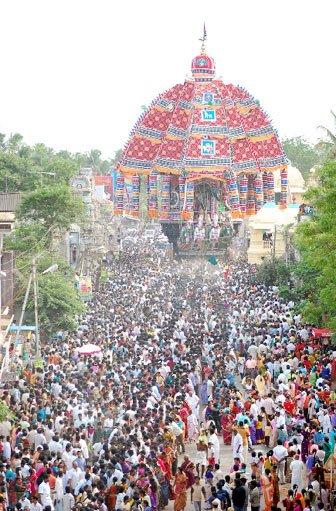
The Great Thear (ஆழித் தேர்) of Sri Thyagarajaswami, Tiruvarur

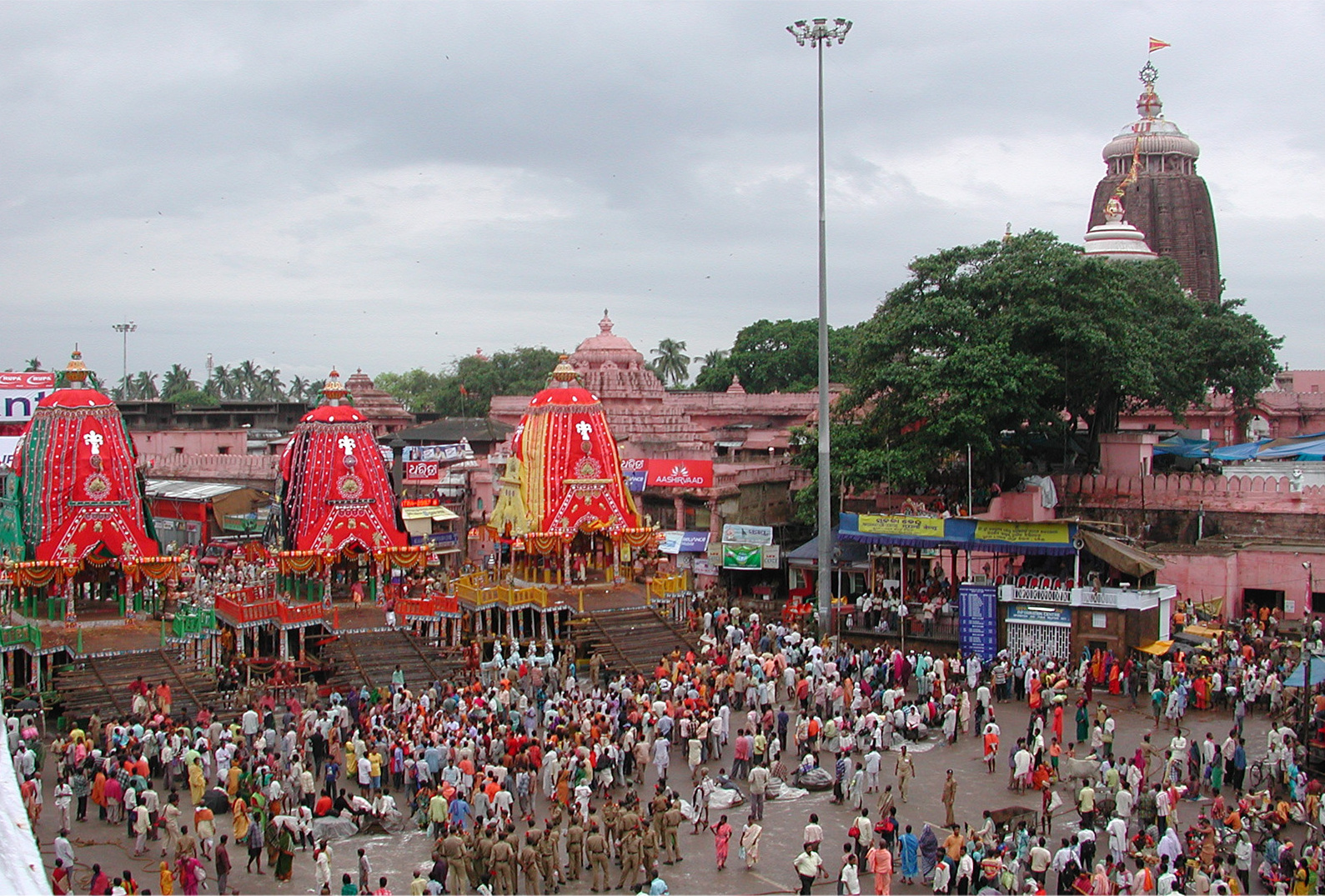
The Rath Yatra in Puri in modern times showing the three chariots of the deities with the Temple in the background

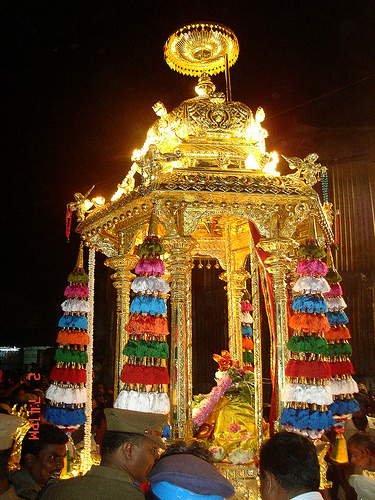
Picture of Tirunelveli Nellaiappar Temple Golden Ratha

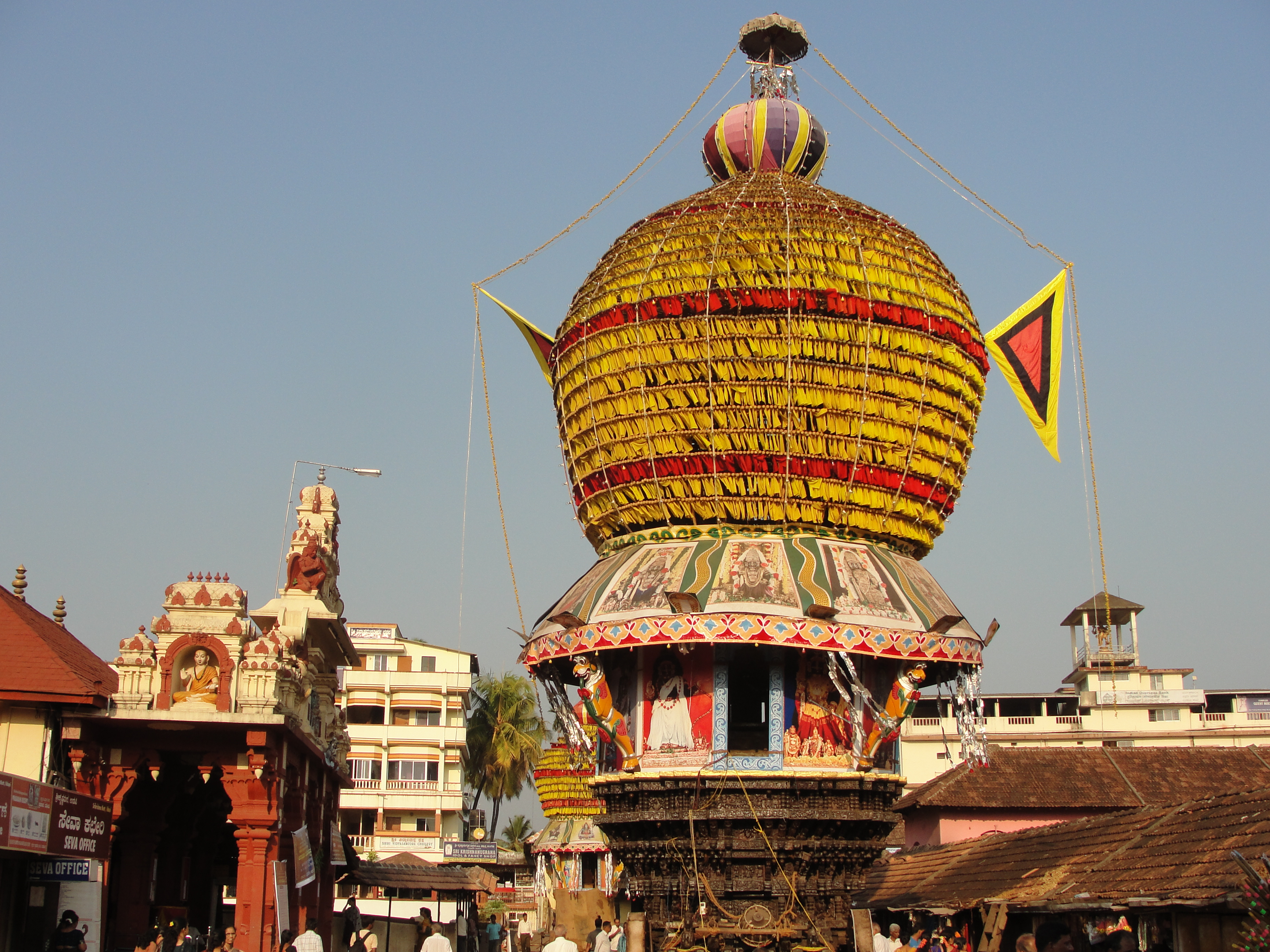
Temple car (decorated), Sri Krishna temple, Udupi, Karnataka, India

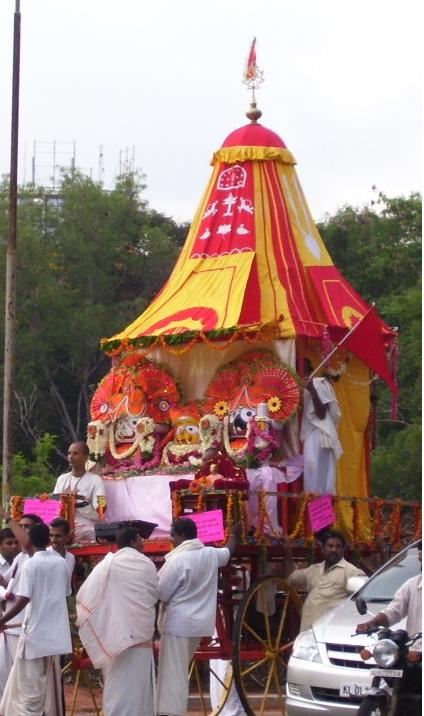
ISKCON Rath Yatra at Thiruvananthapuram, India.

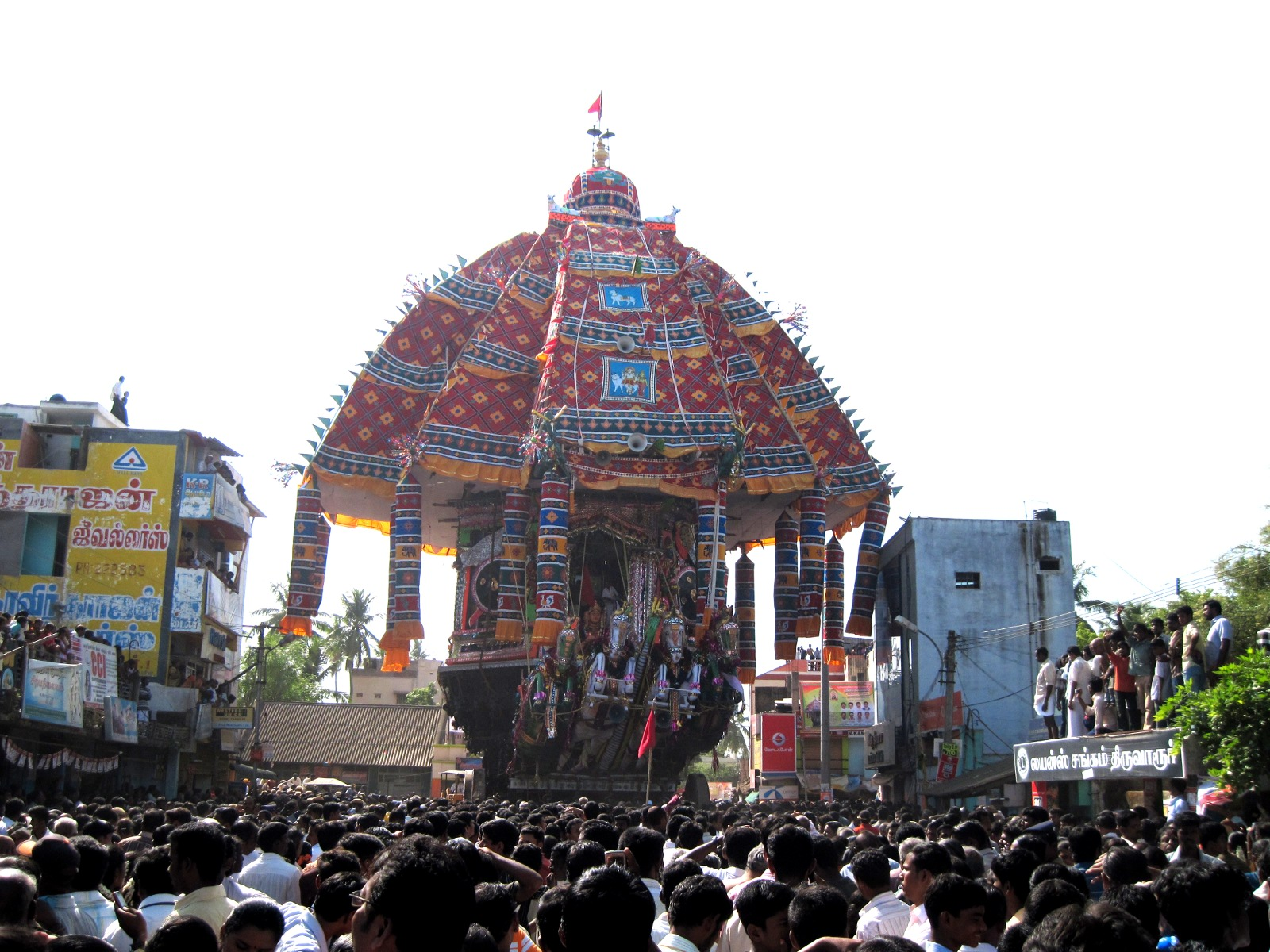
Tiruvarur The largest Temple Ratha car in Tamil Nadu

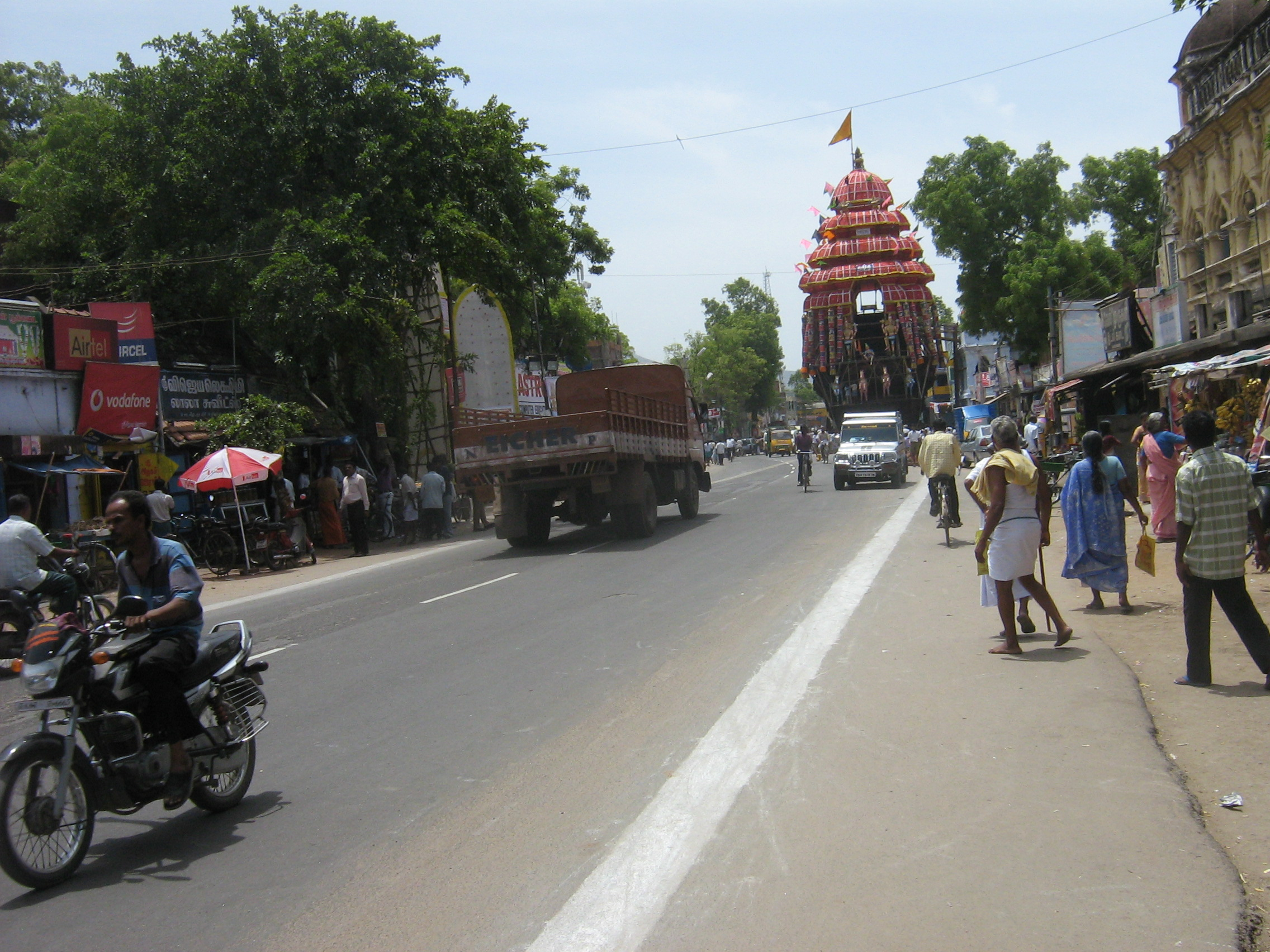
Srivilliputtur Andal Ther - 2nd largest Temple Rath in Tamil Nadu

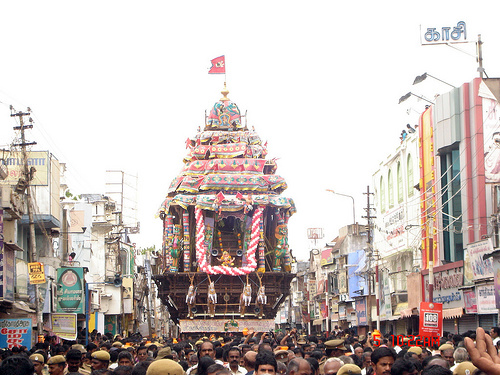
Tirunelveli Nellaiappar Temple Car - 3rd largest Temple Ratha in Tamil Nadu

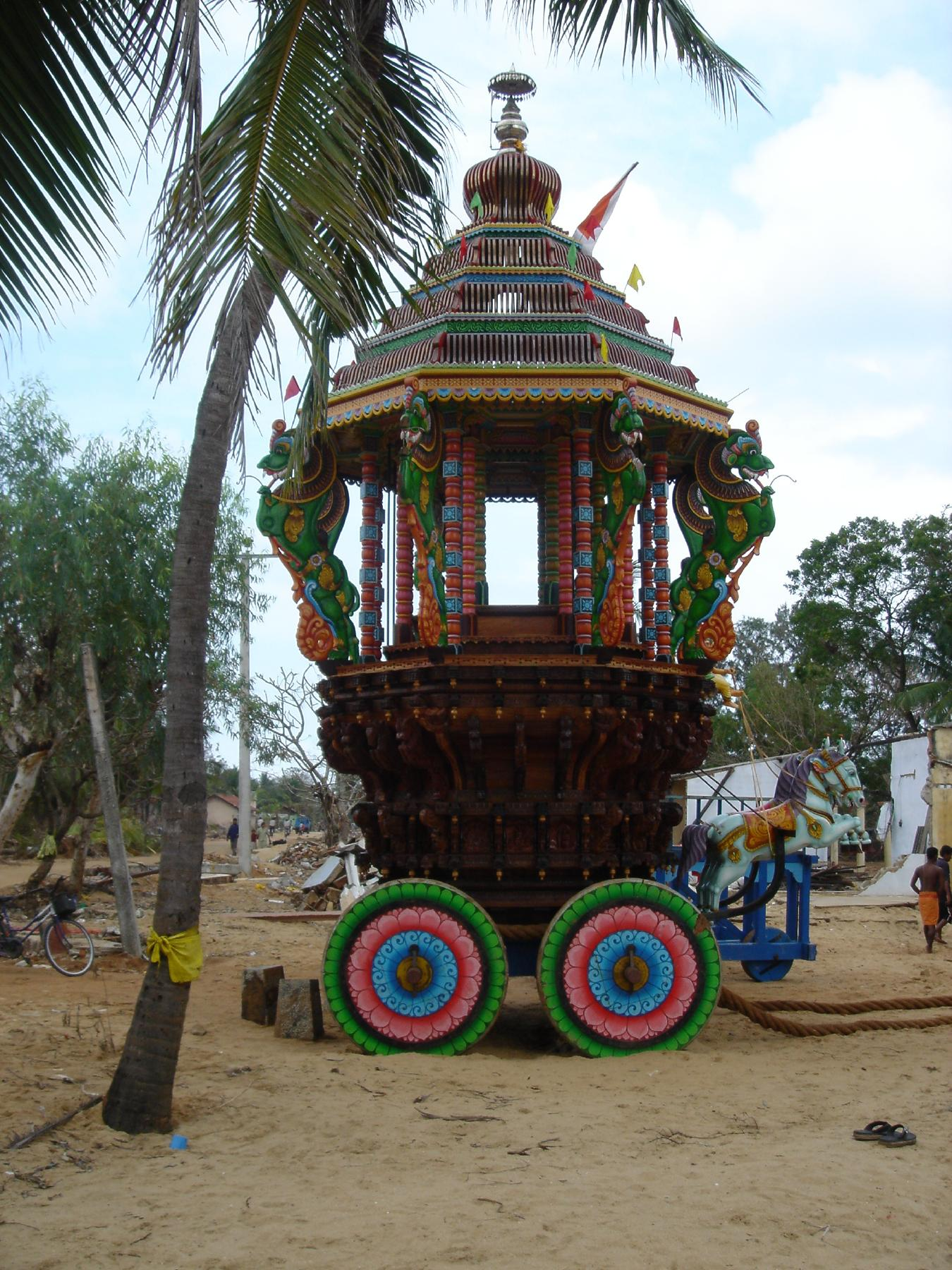
Temple Ratha in Colombo, Sri Lanka

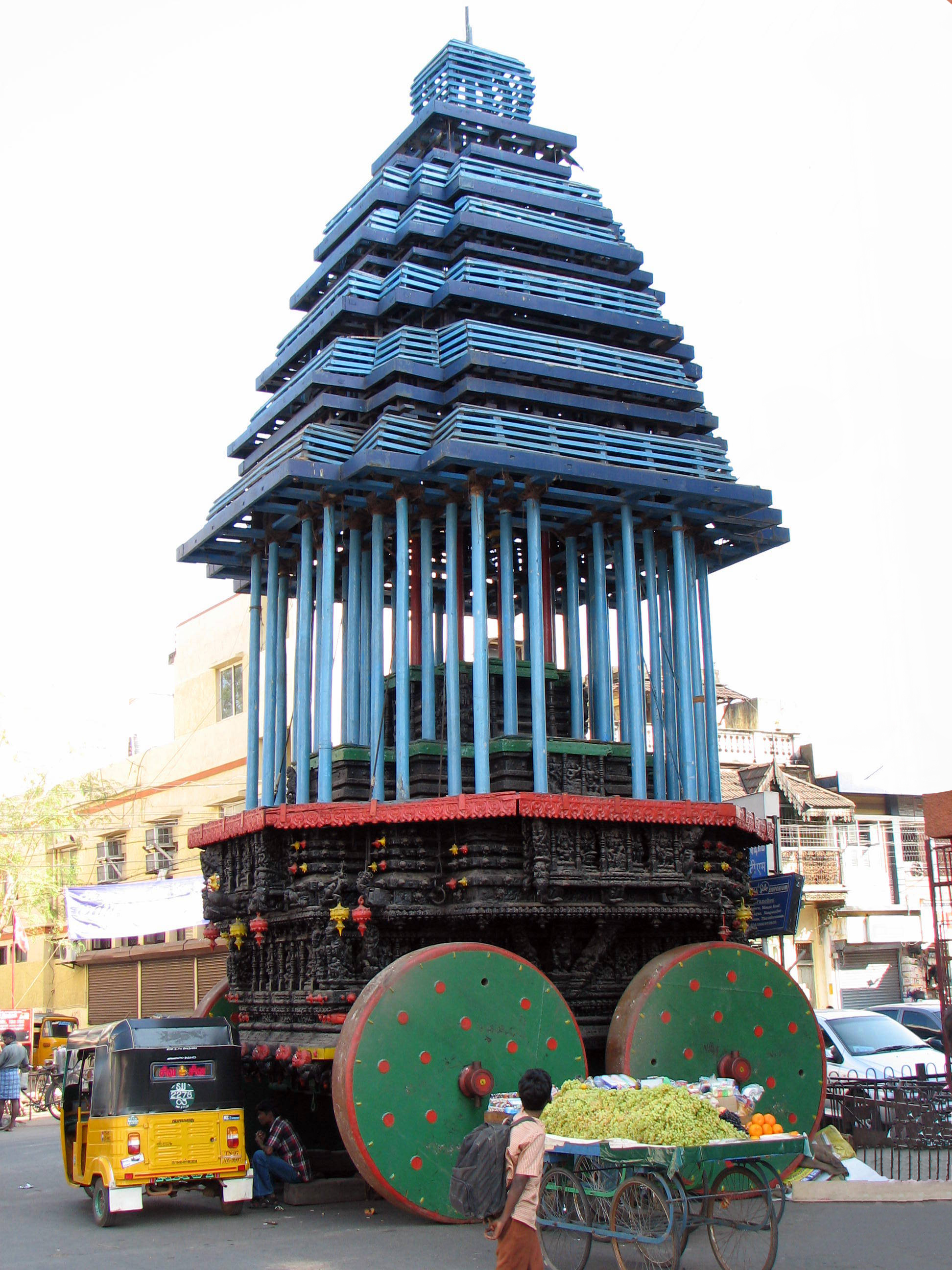
Temple Ratha in Chennai, India

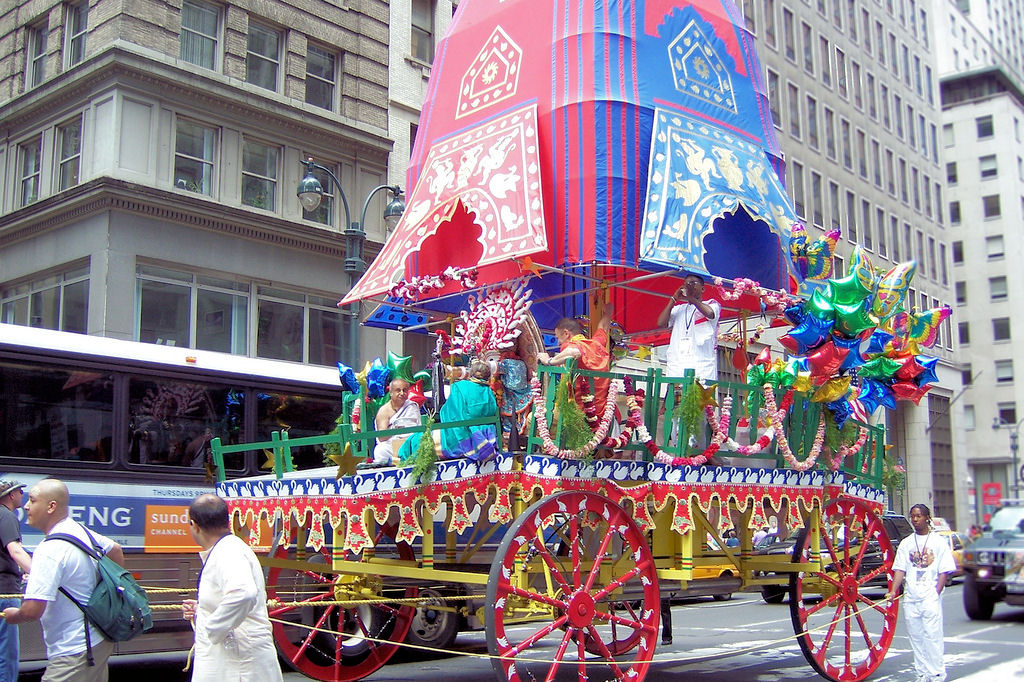
Rath Yatra festival in New York City organized by ISKCON

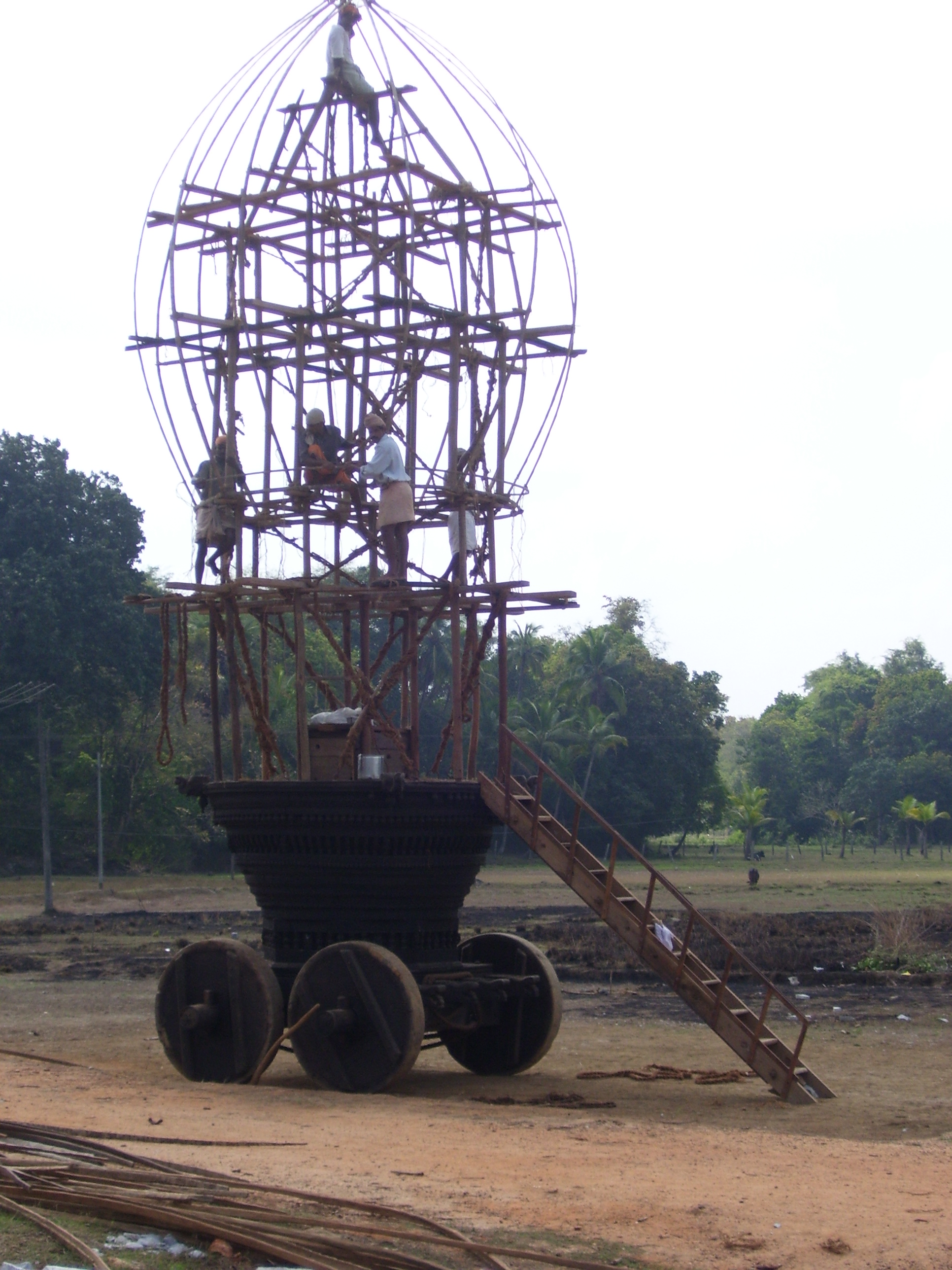
Construction of ratha

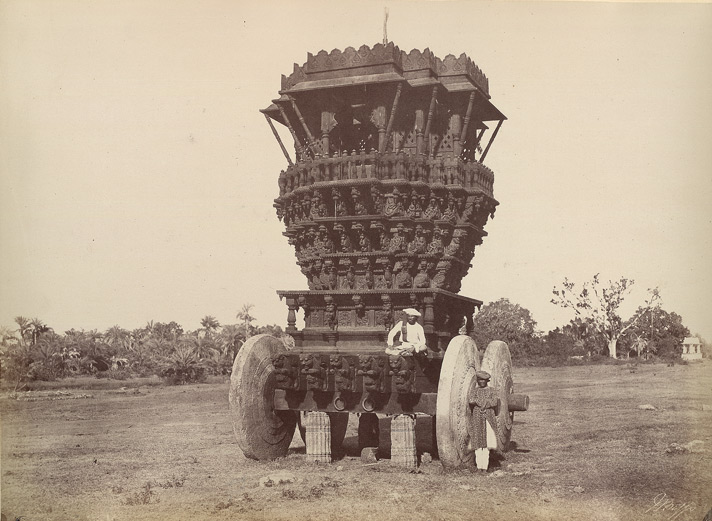
Banashankari Amma Temple's wooden Ratha, Badami, Karnataka

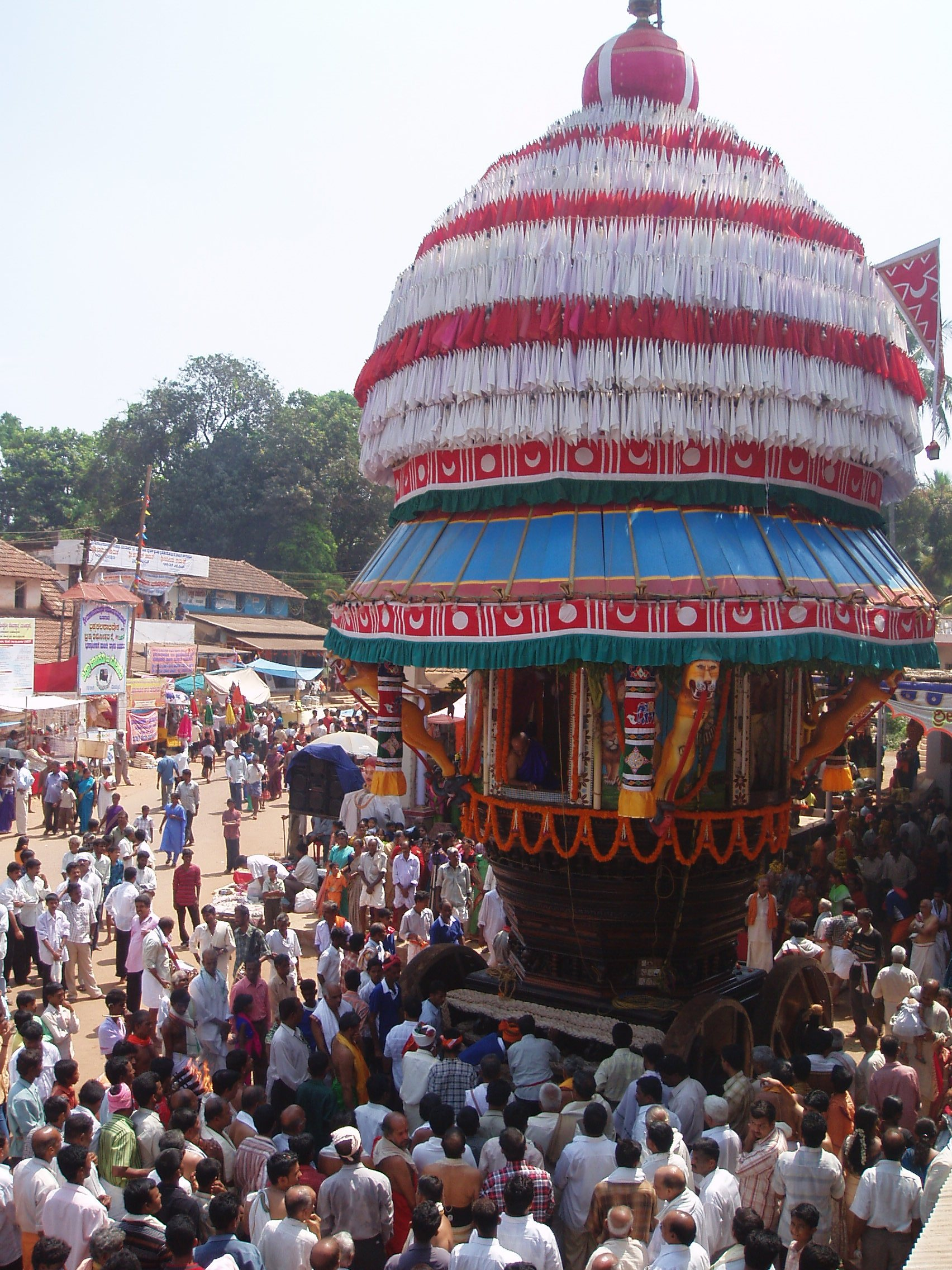
Decorated Ratha, Mundkur, Udupi District, Karnataka.

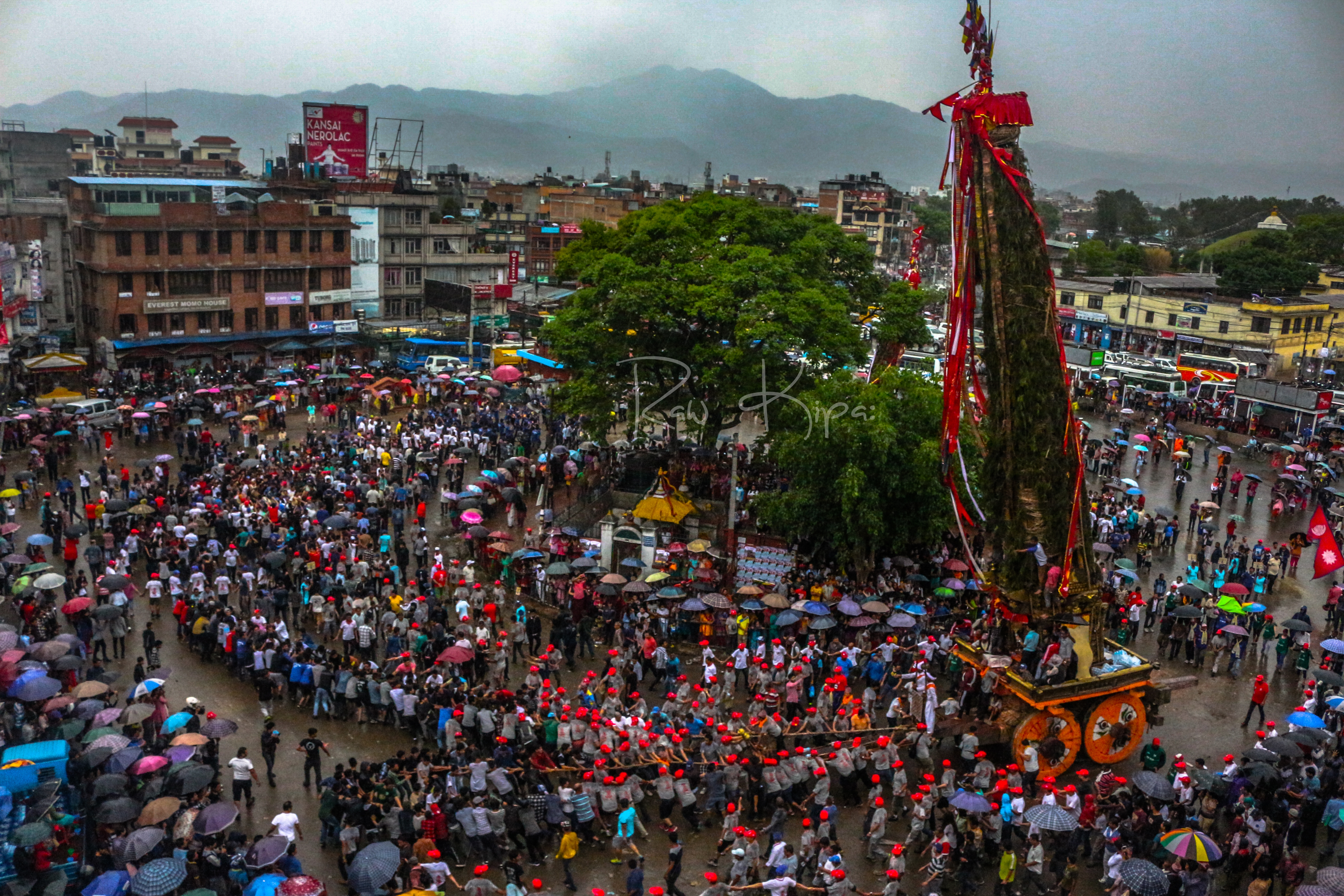
Rato Machhindranath Jatra at Lalitpur, Nepal

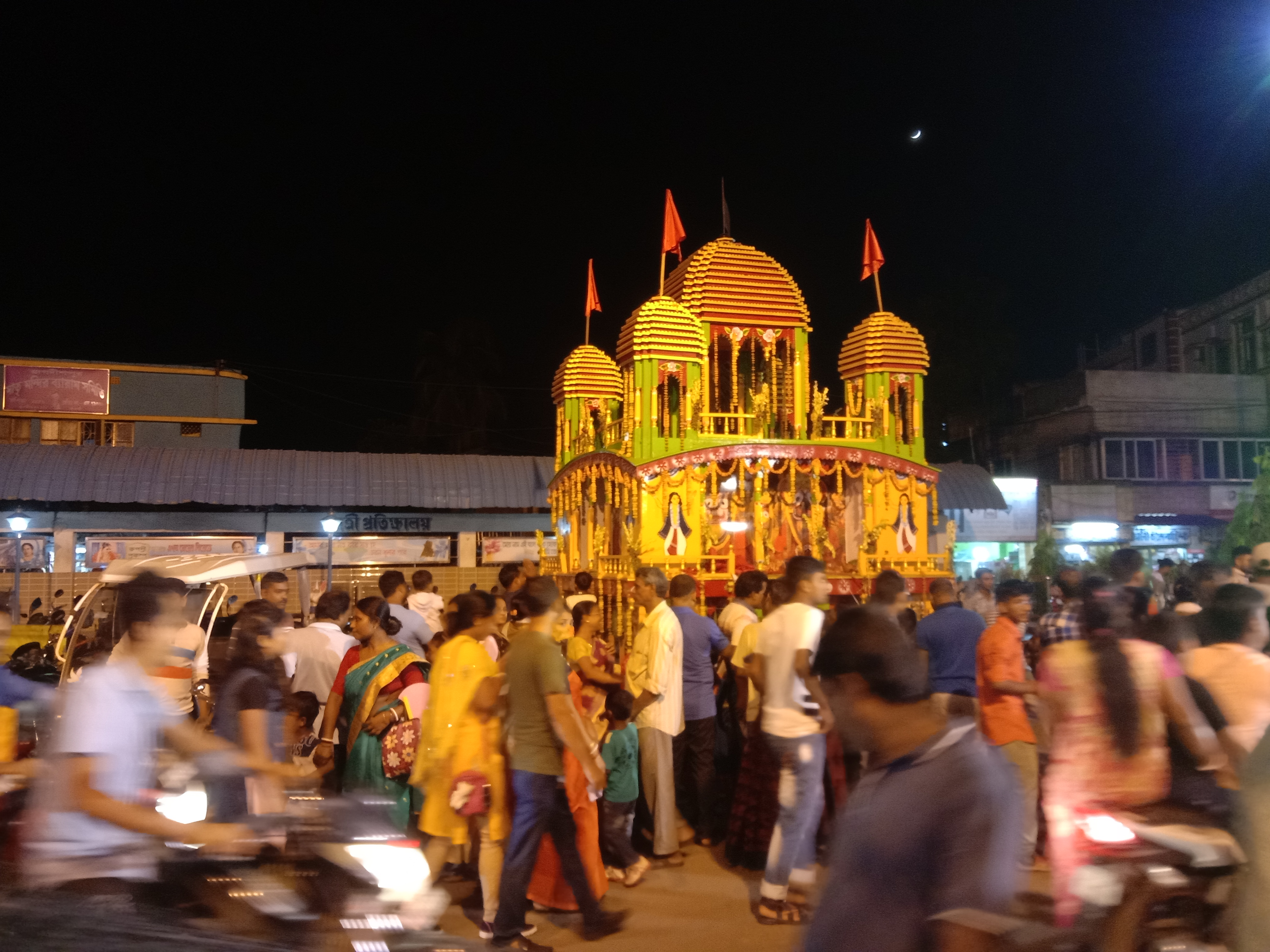
Chariot of Jagadishpur, in West Bengal.

== Rathas buildings ==
In some Hindu temples, there are shrines or buildings named rathas because they have the shape of a huge chariot or because they contain a divinity as does a temple chariot.

The most known are the Pancha Rathas (=5 rathas) in Mahabalipuram, although not with the shape of a chariot.

Another example is the Jaga mohan of the Konark Sun Temple in Konarâk, built on a platform with twelve sculptures of wheels, as a symbol of the chariot of the Sun.

Buildings

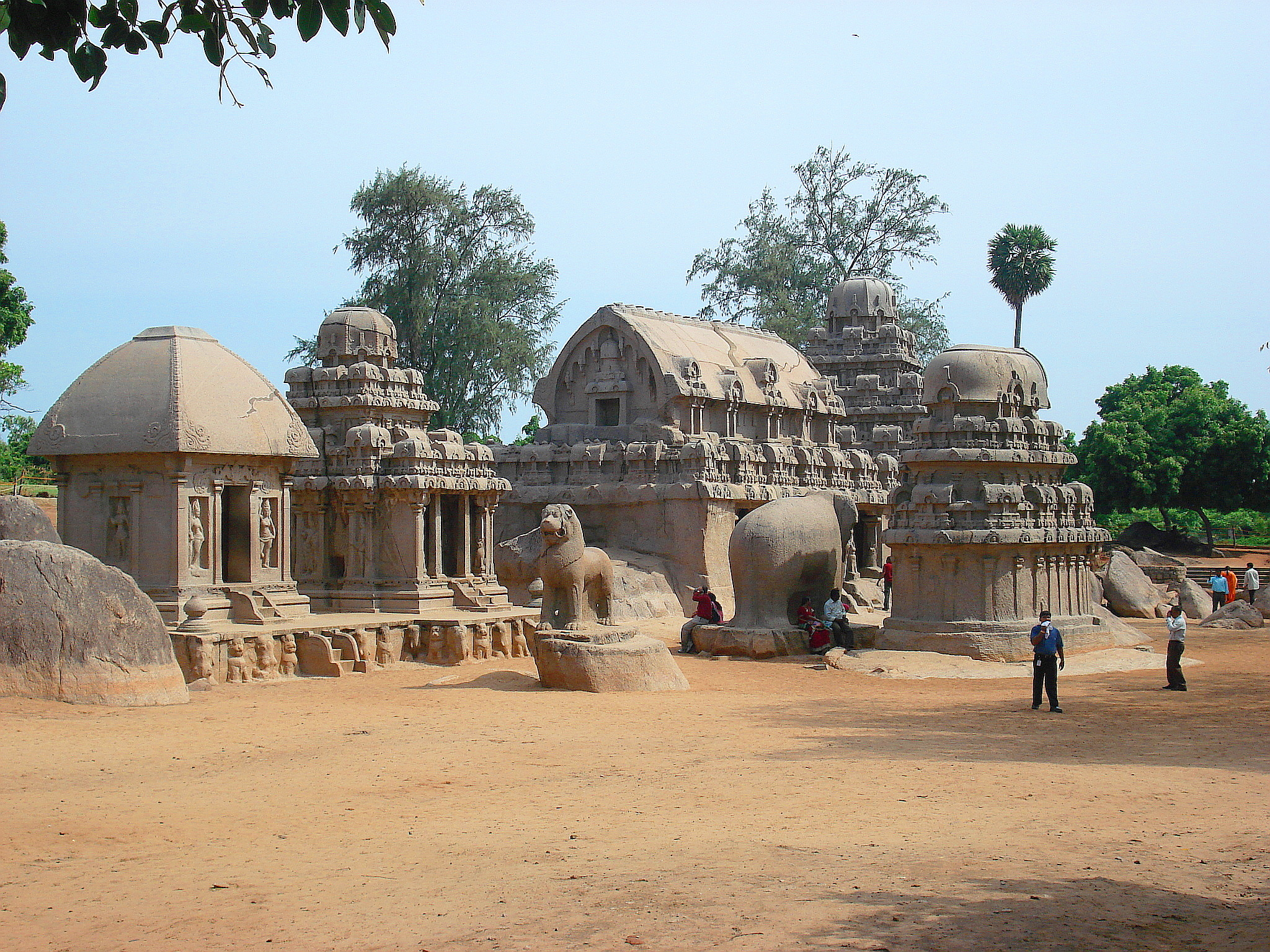
'Five Rathas' at Mamallapuram, Tamil Nadu.

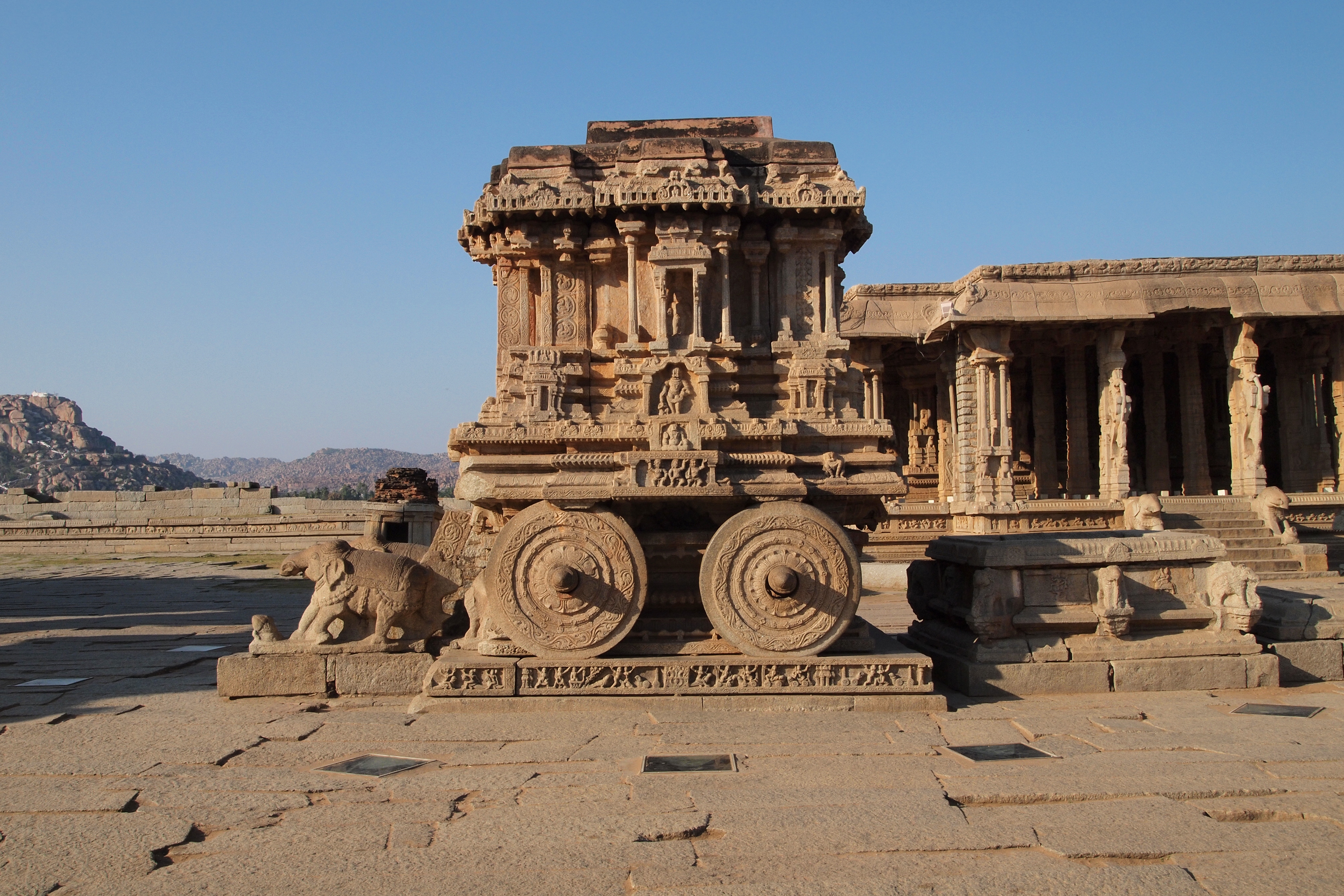
Sculpture of an elephant drawn ratha, Hampi, Karnataka

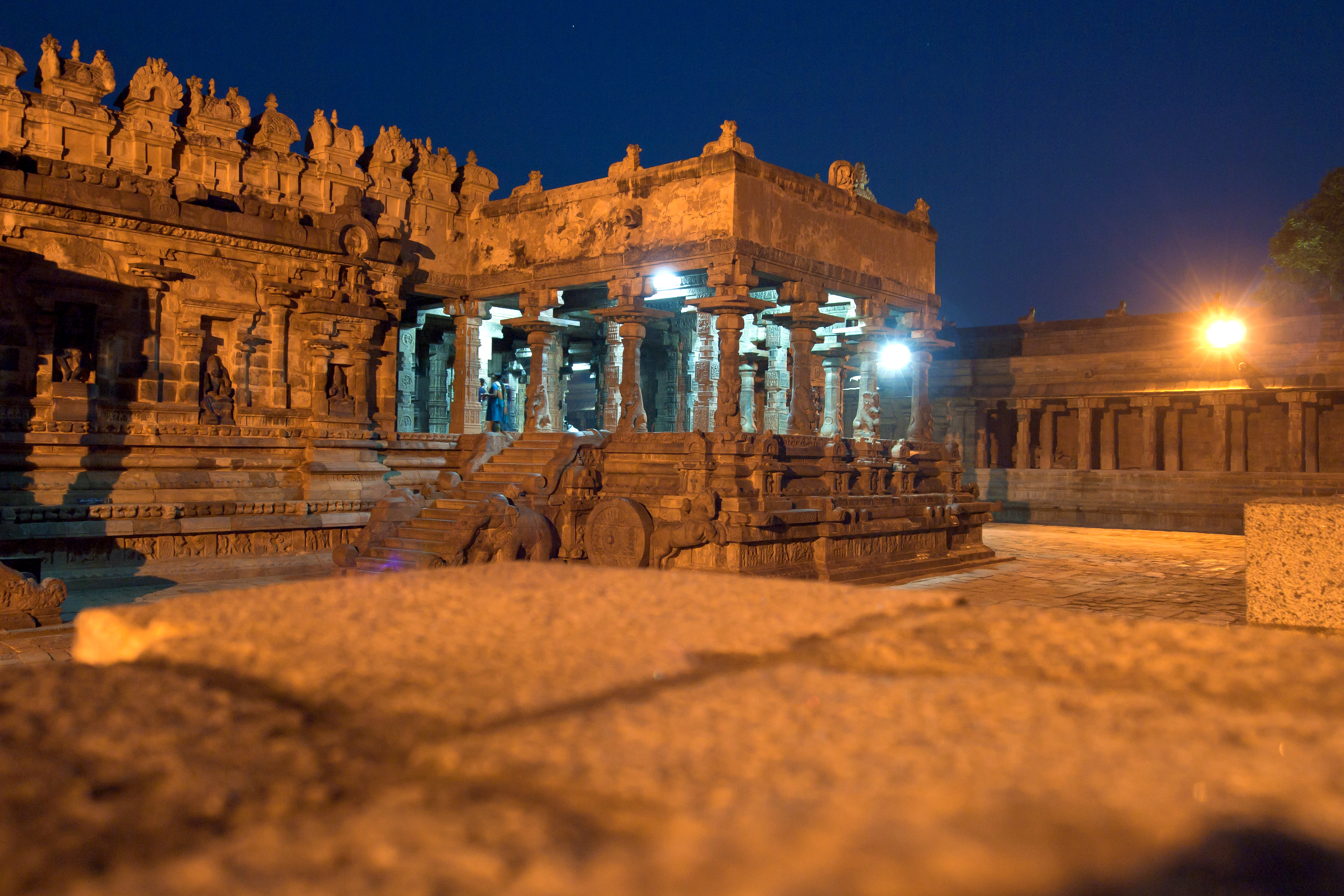
Airavatesvara Temple sanctum in the form of a chariot, Darasuram, Tamil Nadu

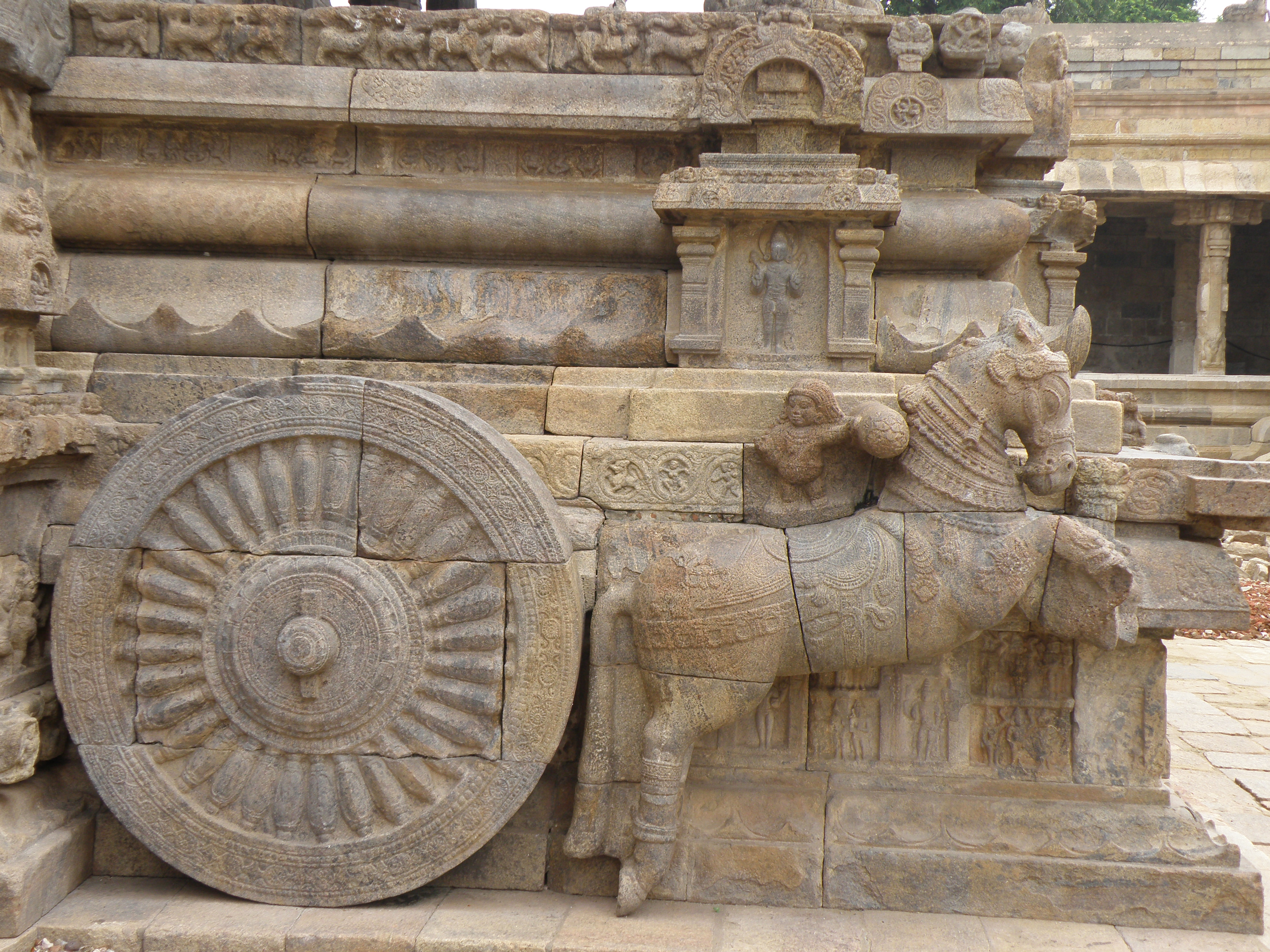
Temple chariot of the Airavatesvara Temple in Darasuram, Tamil Nadu

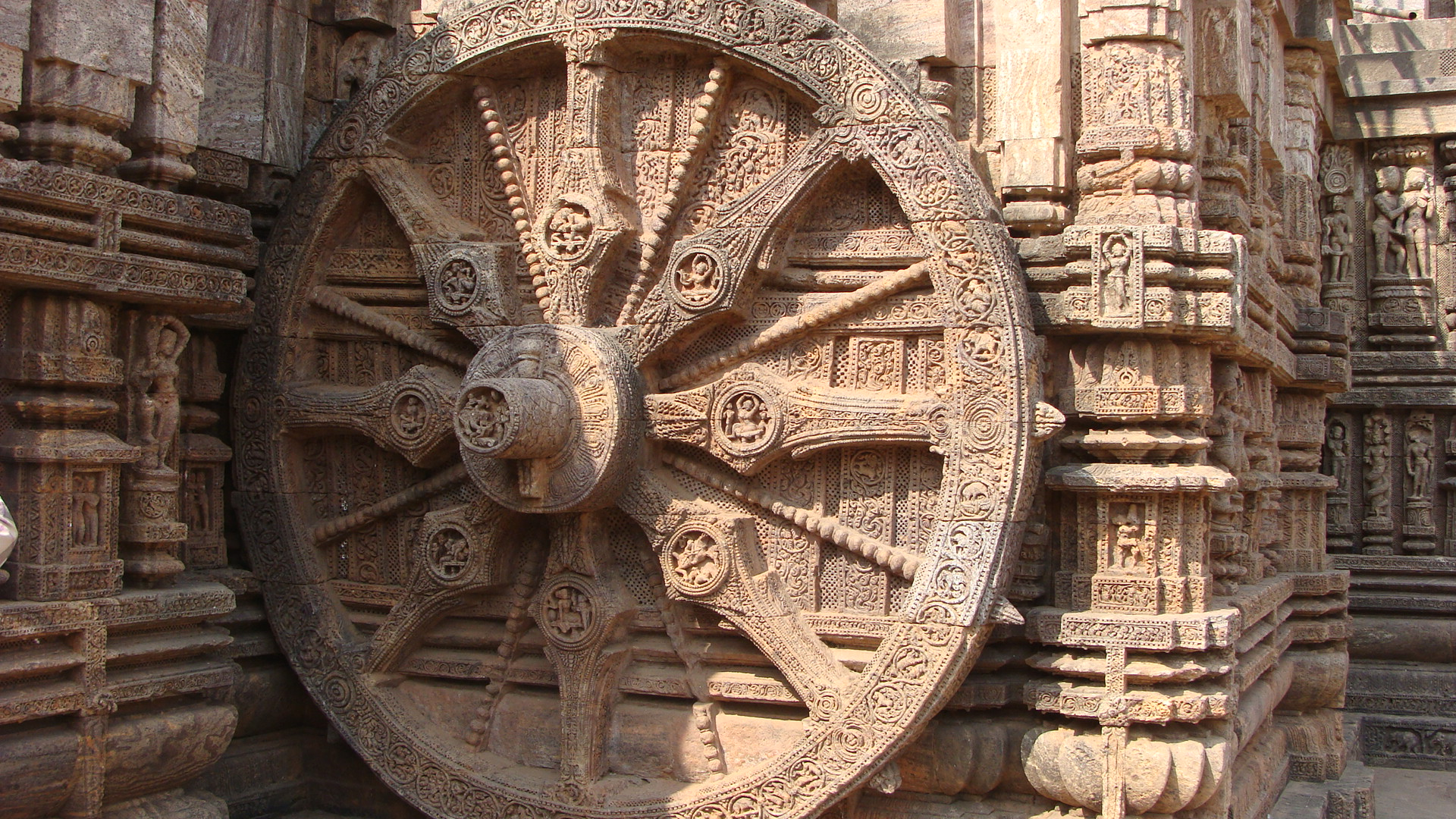
Konark Sun Temple Ratha wheel

== Rathas in architecture ==
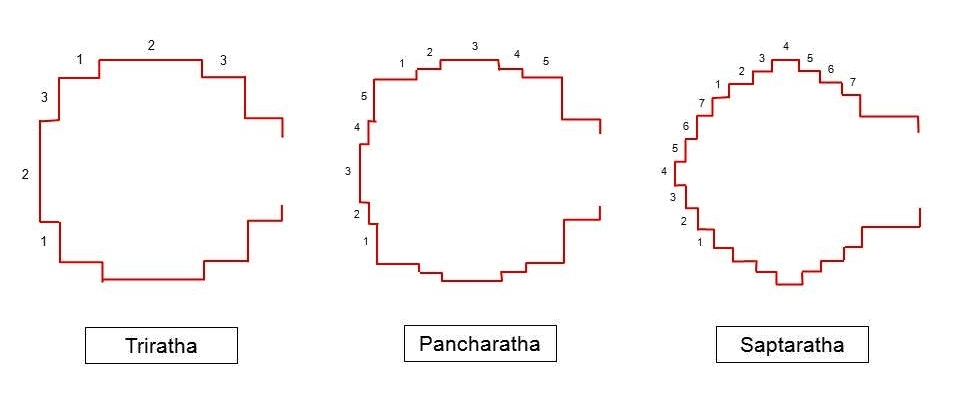
Plans of the main types of buildings with rathas

In Hindu temple architecture, a ratha is a facet or vertical offset projections on the tower (generally a Shikhara).

== See also ==
- Ashva
- History of the horse in the Indian subcontinent
- Types of carriages
- Rathera (sport)

== Sources ==
- Edwin Bryant (2001). The Quest for the Origins of Vedic Culture. Oxford University Press. ISBN 0-19-513777-9
- Daniyal, Shoaib (14 June 2018). "Putting the horse before the cart: What the discovery of 4,000-year-old 'chariot' in UP signifies". Scroll.in.
- Flood, Gavin D. (1996), An Introduction to Hinduism, Cambridge University Press
- Fussman, G.; Kellens, J.; Francfort, H.-P.; Tremblay, X. (2005). Aryas, Aryens et Iraniens en Asie Centrale. Institut Civilisation Indienne ISBN 2-86803-072-6
- Kuz'mina (2007), Mallory, J (ed.), The Origin of the Indo-Iranians, Brill, doi:10.1163/ej.9789004160545.i-763, ISBN 9789047420712
- Olson, Carl (2007), The Many Colors of Hinduism: A Thematic-historical Introduction, Rutgers University Press
- Parpola, Asko (2020). "Royal "Chariot" Burials of Sanauli near Delhi and Archaeological Correlates of Prehistoric Indo-Iranian Languages". Studia Orientalia Electronica. 8: 176. doi:10.23993/store.98032.
- Peter Raulwing (2000). Horses, Chariots and Indo-Europeans, Foundations and Methods of Chariotry Research from the Viewpoint of Comparative Indo-European Linguistics. Archaeolingua, Series Minor 13, Budapest.
- Vasudha Venugopal ET bureau, https://economictimes.indiatimes.com/news/politics-and-nation/mahabharata-much-older-say-asi-archaeologists/articleshow/71658119.cms Mahabharata much older, say ASI Archaeologists , The Economic Times
- Witzel, Michael (2019), "Early 'Aryans' and their neighbors outside and inside India", Journal of Biosciences, 44 (3) 58, doi:10.1007/s12038-019-9881-7, PMID 31389347, S2CID 195804491
