= Tiruvarur Chariot festival =

Religious festival in Tamil Nadu, India

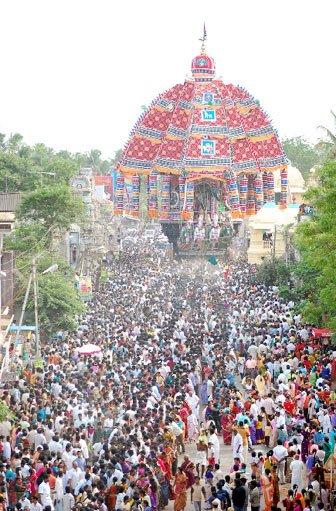
The ratha of Thyagarajaswami, Tiruvarur.

The Tiruvarur Chariot festival, known in Tamil as Tiruvarur Terottam, is a festival following the rituals and traditions associated with the Thyagaraja Temple, Tiruvarur, in Tamil Nadu, India. During the festival, a representation of Thyagarajaswami (Shiva) is brought for a procession from within the temple upon a ratha, with his consort Kondi (Parvati) to bless devotees while riding in one of the world's largest chariots.

== Description ==
The chariot is known for being one of the largest of its kind in the country. The festival is one of the ancient festivals that are often mentioned in the devotional hymns of saints like (Appar, Sambandar and Sundarar) in Tamil literature, usually held during the summer between months of March and April every year, lasts more than 25 days. On the day of the chariot festival, the utsava murti (festival image of the deity) is decorated and brought out of the temple along with his consort to the ratha, for a daylong procession.

This chariot is said to the biggest one of its type in size and height. It is 96 feet (29 m) tall and weighs more than 300 tons. There are four more chariots that carry Parvati, Ganesha, Murugan, Kamalambika, and Chandra, respectively.

'Experienced and expert carpenters do the intricate wood carving of all the deities adorning the base," says scholar and historian Kudavayil Balasubramanian. 'Aalhi Ther' is the biggest temple chariot in Asia. The 30-ft tall temple car rises to 96 ft, after decoration is completed with bamboo poles and colourful cloth, the kalasha alone accounting for 6 ft, all of which take the original weight of 220 tonnes to 350. Incidentally, the massive car of Valluvar Kottam in Chennai was built on the lines of the Tiruvarur 'Aalhi Ther.'
