= Disco Volante =

The term Disco Volante (Italian for flying disc or flying saucer) may refer to:

- Disco Volante (Mr. Bungle album), a 1995 album by the band Mr. Bungle
- Disco Volante (Lisa album), a 2009 album by singer Lisa
- Disco Volante, a 2000 album by the band Cinerama
- Disco Volante (ship), a ship in the Ian Fleming novel Thunderball
- Il disco volante, a 1964 Italian science fiction comedy

== See also ==
- Alfa Romeo Disco Volante, a series of experimental sports racing cars
- Alfa Romeo Disco Volante by Touring
