= Volante (carriage) =

Two-wheeled Cuban horse carriage

Volante (volanta in Spanish) is a two-wheeled open carriage with a retractable hood that was popular in Cuba in the mid-1800s. The vehicle was directed by a postilion rider. The large wheels are positioned behind the seat and are over 6 feet in diameter with an 8.5 inch hub. Most of the volantes were imported to Cuba from England, France, or the United States.

Volantas

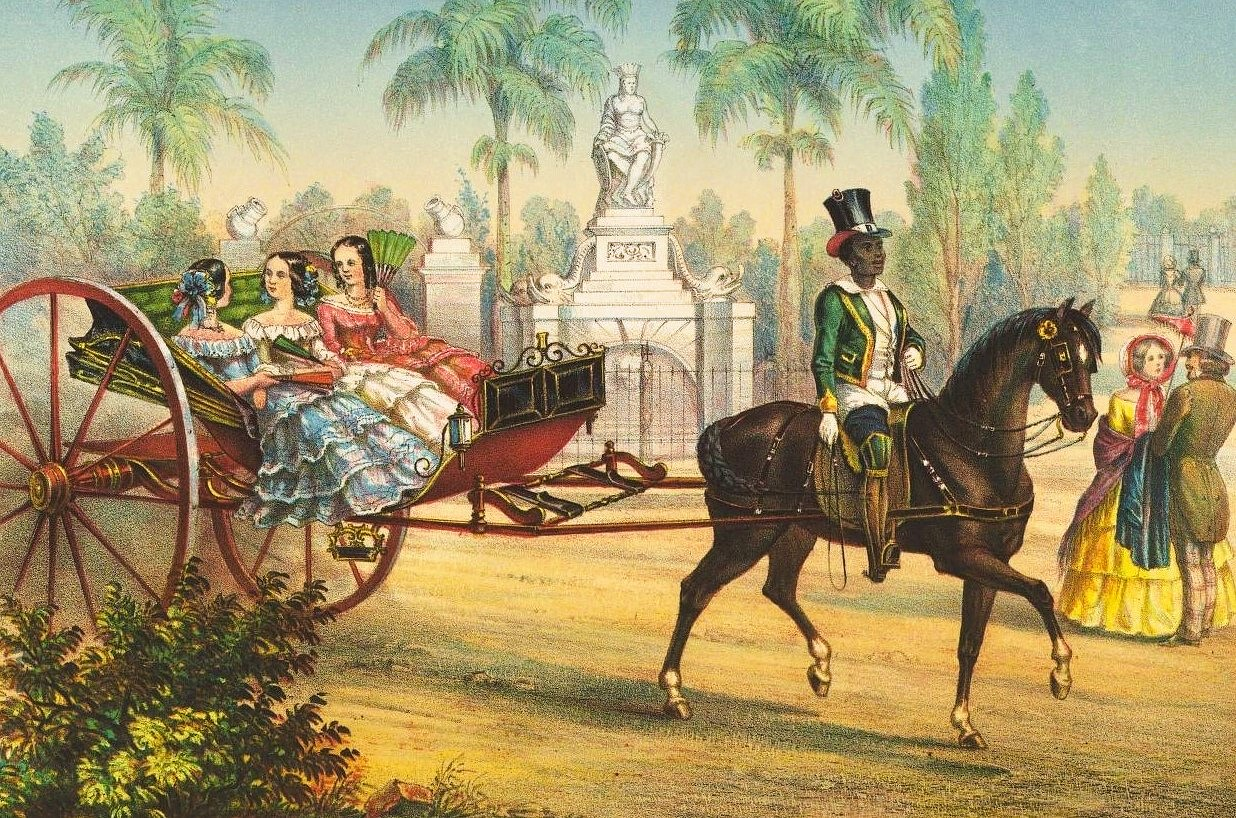
Havana, Cuba, 1830s-1840s

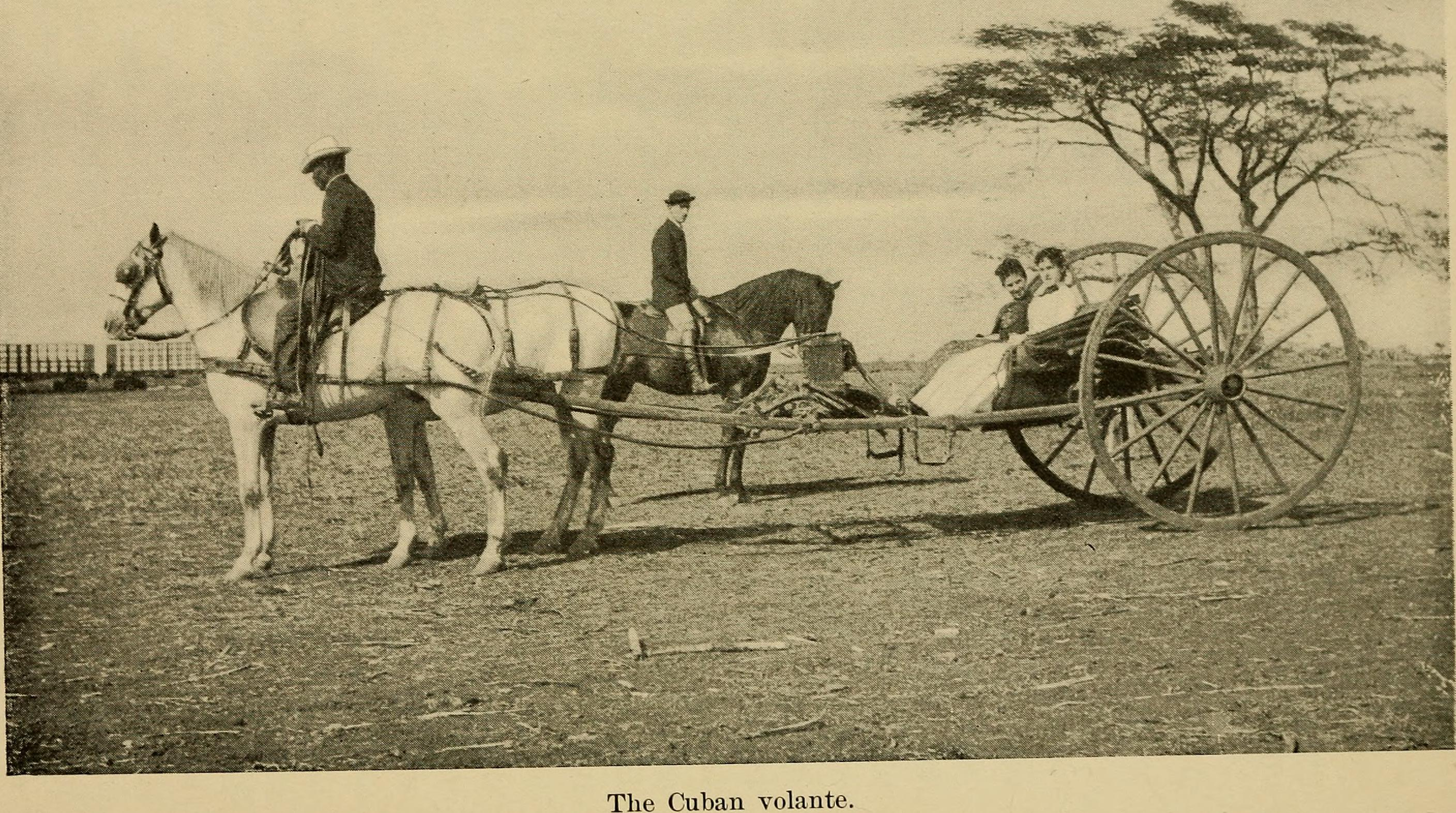
c. 1900

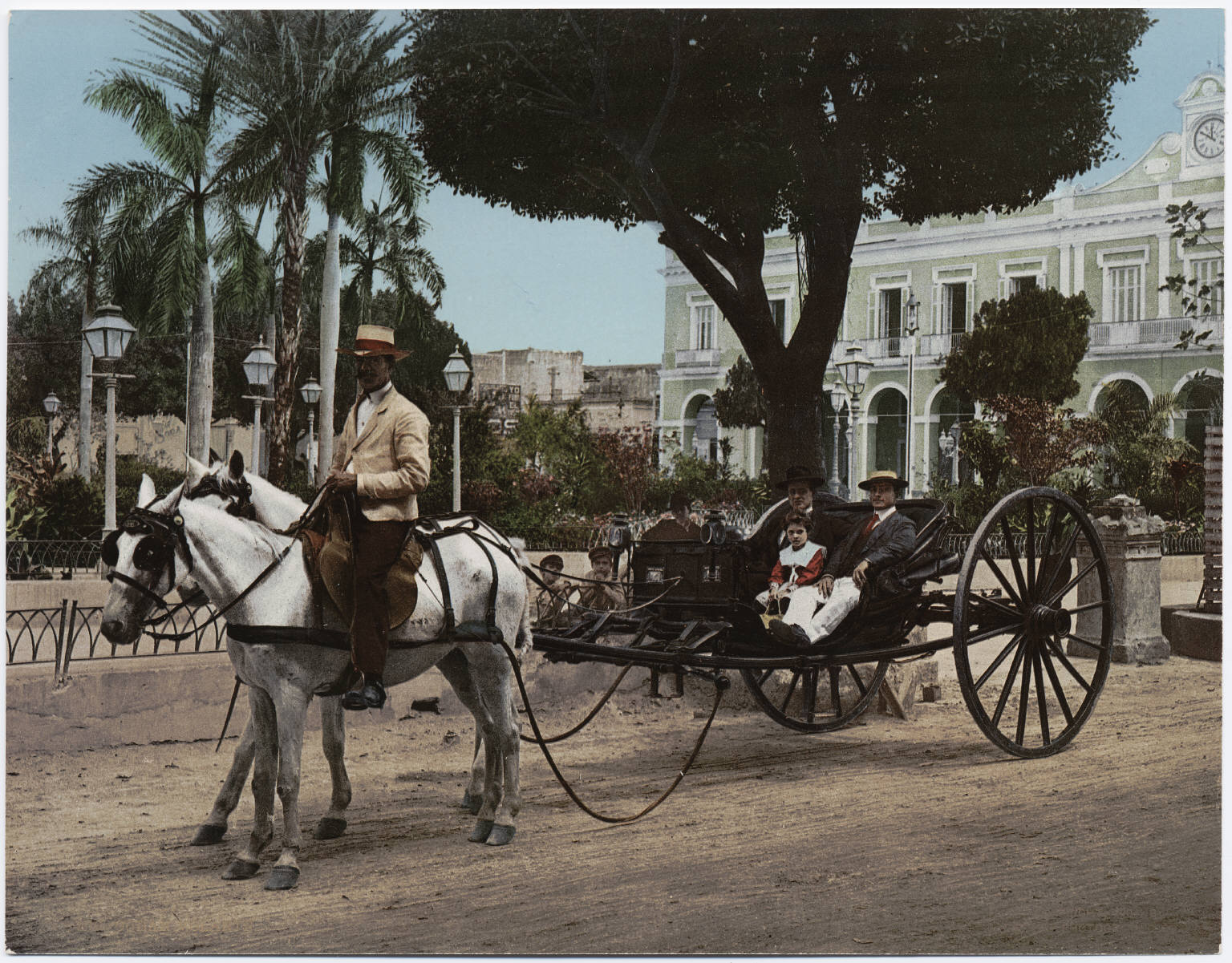
1904

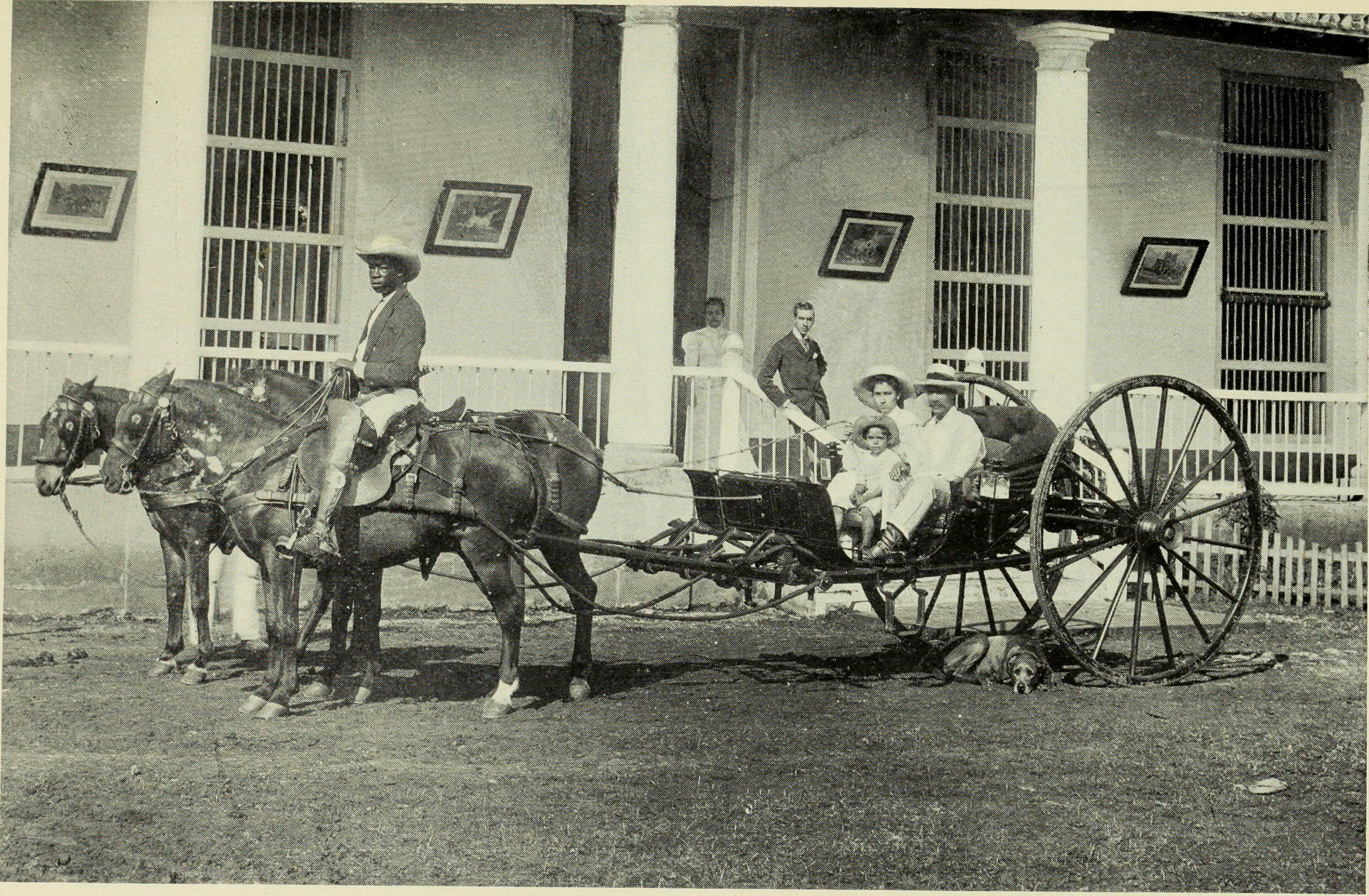
3-horse volante, 1899
