= Yathothkari Perumal Temple =

Hindu temple in Kanchipuram

Tiruvekka Temple
- Yathokthakari Temple
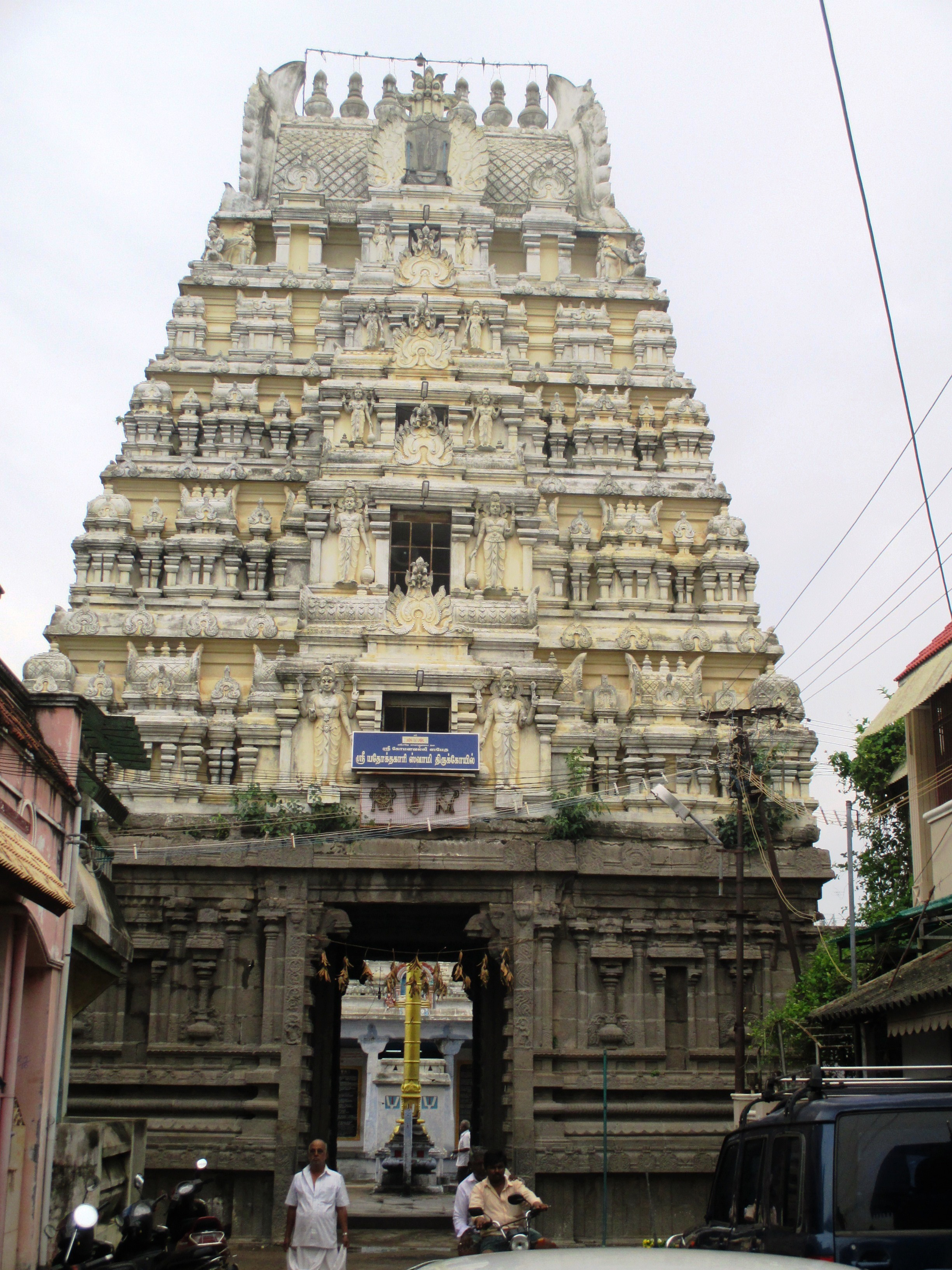

- Location in Tamil Nadu

Religion
- Affiliation: Hinduism
- District: Kanchipuram
- Deity: Yathothkari (Vishnu)

Location
- Location: Kanchipuram
- State: Tamil Nadu
- Country: India
- Coordinates: 12°49′27″N 79°42′44″E

Architecture
- Type: Dravidian architecture

Tiruvekkaa Temple or Yathothkari Perumal Temple (locally called Sonnavannam Seitha Perumall) is a Hindu temple located in Kanchipuram in the South Indian state of Tamil Nadu and dedicated to the Hindu god Vishnu. Constructed in the Dravidian style of architecture, the temple is glorified in the Naalayira Divya Prabandham, the early medieval Tamil canon of the Alvar saints from the 6th–9th centuries CE. It is one of the 108 Divya Desams dedicated to Vishnu, who is worshipped as Yathothkari Perumal, and his consort Lakshmi as Komalavalli. This is the 2nd largest temple in south Kanchi, after the Varadaraja perumal temple.

The temple is considered one of three oldest Vishnu temples in Kanchipuram, the other two being Ulagalantha Perumal Temple and Pandava Thoothar Perumal Temple. The temple finds a mention in the Sangam text Perumpāṇāṟṟuppaṭai which is dated between 300 BCE and 100 CE. The temple is believed to have been built by the Pallavas of the late 8th century CE, with later contributions from Medieval Cholas and Vijayanagara kings. The temple has three inscriptions on its walls, two dating from the period of Parantaka I (907–955 CE), Kulothunga Chola I (1070–1120 CE) and one to that of Rajadhiraja Chola (1018–1054 CE). A granite wall surrounds the temple, enclosing all the shrines. There is a three-tiered rajagopuram, the temple's gateway tower, in the temple.

Yathothkari Perumal is believed to have appeared for Saraswati and Thirumalisai Alvar. Six daily rituals and three yearly festivals are held at the temple. The temple houses a rare image of Ranganatha recumbent on his left hand unlike other temples where he is recumbent on his right.

Poigai Alvar, one of the Alvars, was born at this temple's lotus tank. Panguni Brahmotsavam celebrated during April - May and Poigai Alvar birthday during Aipassi Thiruvonam star are the two major festivals celebrated in the temple.

== Legend ==
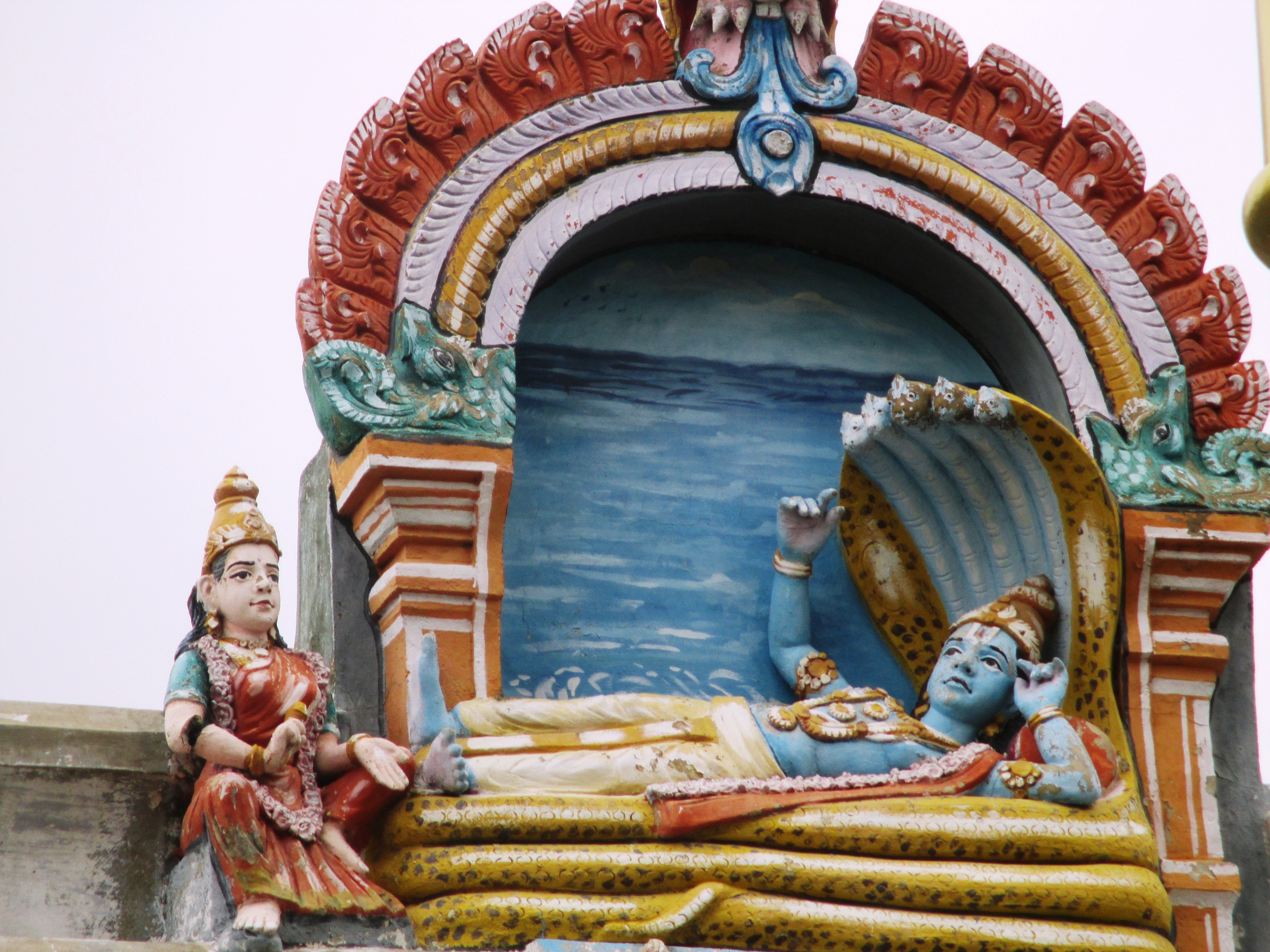
Stucco image indicating the legend

As per Hindu legend, once there was an argument between Saraswati, the consort of Brahma and Lakshmi on superiority. They went to Indra, the king of celestial deities. Indra judged Lakshmi as superior and not satisfied with his argument, Saraswati went to her husband, Brahma. He also chose Lakshmi to be the superior one. Saraswati was unhappy with the decision and decided to stay away from Brahma. Brahma did a severe penance praying to Vishnu and did an ashvamedha yagna. Saraswati was still angry that the yagna, which usually is done along with consorts was done alone by Brahma. She tried to disrupt the penance, but Vishnu interfered with his serpent Adishesha. Saraswati, on seeing Vishnu in her path, accepted her defeat and subsided in the form of river Vegavathi. As Vishnu interfered the path of the river, it was termed Vegavani, then as Vegannai and gradually corrupted to Vekka. The presiding deity thus got one of his names, Vegasetu. As per historian Nagaswamy, the temple was called Vehha meaning Vishnu leaning as a slanted slope, which gradually became vekka.

Once sage Bhargava had a son through Kanakangi, a celestial dancer. The boy was stillborn and was not fully developed during his birth. Kanakangi left his son under bushes and left to celestial world. It is believed that the child was a divine incarnation of one of Vishnu's weapons, the Chakra. By the grace of Vishnu and Lakshmi, the baby became alright and began to cry. A childless farmer couple who were passing by took up the child, named him Sivavakkiyar and started rearing him. Once the boy reached adulthood, he was sceptical about choosing between Shaivism and Vaishnavism. He was defeated in arguments by Pey Alvar. He became a devotee of Vaishnavism and the disciple of Pey Alvar. Sivavakkiyar was also called Bhakthisarar and later as Thirumalisai Alvar.

Thirumalisai had a disciple by name Kanikkannan. He also had an old lady serving him - Thirumalisai prayed to the presiding deity of the temple and by the grace of Bhujangasayana Perumal, the old lady became a beautiful young lady. The Pallava king who was ruling the region at that time got attracted by the lady and married her. With time while the king was growing older, the lady remained young. He called up Kanikannan and ordered to sing praise of him so that he also turned young. When he refused, the king ordered Kanikannan to be banished out of the country. Kanikannan explained this to his master Thirumalisai, who prayed to Bhujangasayana Perumal. When the king heard this, he ordered the three to be sent of the country, which they obliged. When the three left Kanchipuram, it was engulfed in darkness. Realising his sin, the king worshipped Bhujangasayana Perumal to return along with his two devotees. Since the presiding deity obliged to his devotees wishes, he is called Yathothkari Perumal. Yathothka means as requested and kari denotes the person who accomplishes the task. One of the Alvars, poet saints of 7-10th century, Poigai Alvar was born at this temple.

== History ==
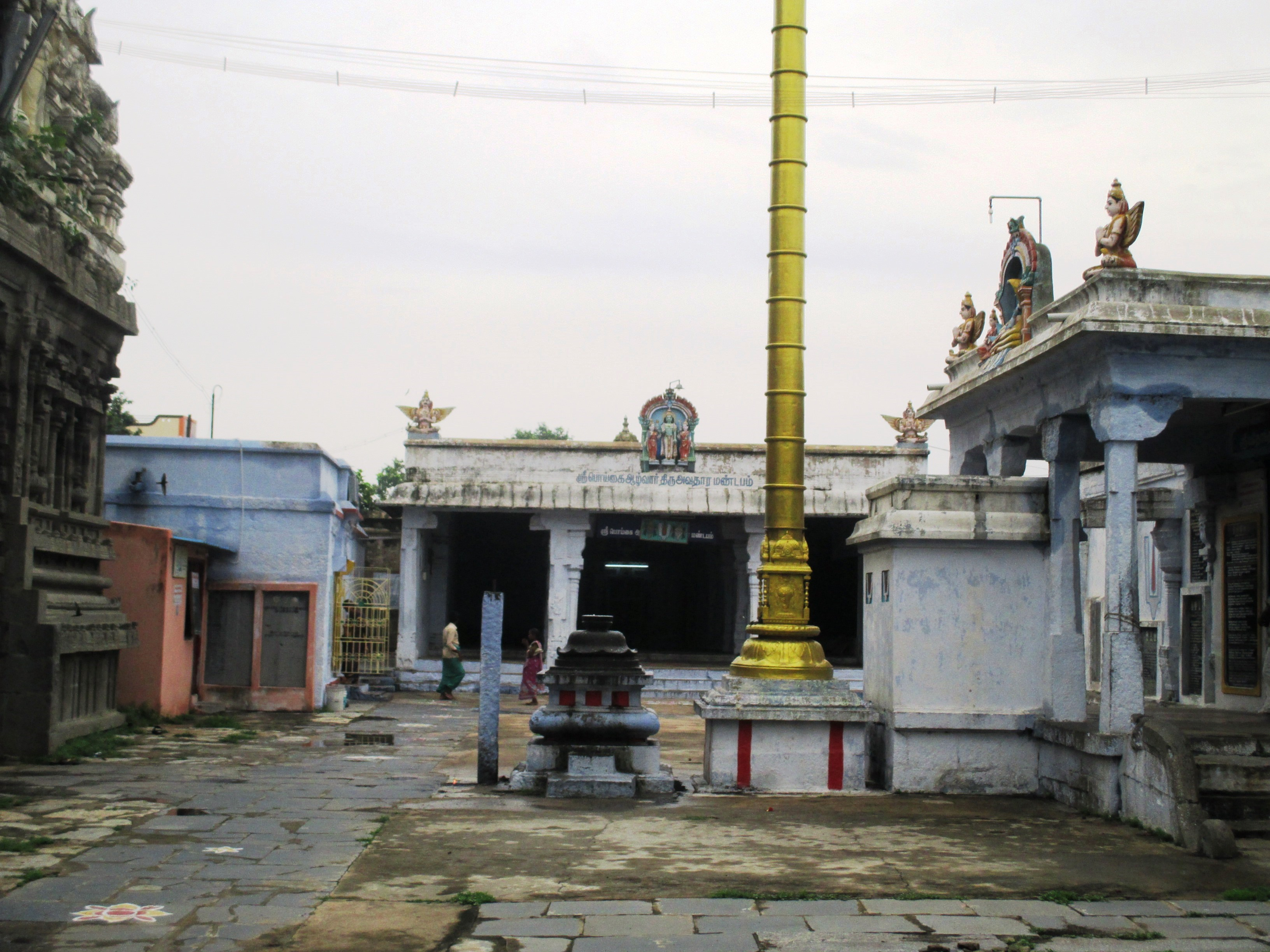
Shrine of Poigai Alvar in the temple

The temple is mentioned in the Sangam text Perumpāṇāṟṟuppaṭai which is dated between 300 BCE and 100 CE. Perumpāṇāṟṟuppaṭai mentions Vishnu sleeping on a serpent bed in the town Thiruvekka where the Gloriosa superba blooms. The temple is originally believed to be built during the period of Pallavas. The temple has a set of inscriptions associated with Cholas. A record of the Chola king, Parantaka I (907–950 CE) indicating gift of 367 kalanju of gold to the temple by an individual. The south wall of the central shrine of the temple has inscriptions from the period Rajendra Chola I (1012–44) indicating gifts of land measuring to one tuni of land and 127 kalanju of gold to the temple. The inscriptions on the base of the eastern wall of the central shrine from the period of Kulothunga Chola I (1070–1120 CE) indicating gift for lighting lamps of the temple. The southern side inscriptions of the temple from the period of Kulothunga Chola III (1178–1218 CE) indicates a gift of village to feed 32 Brahmins.

== Architecture ==
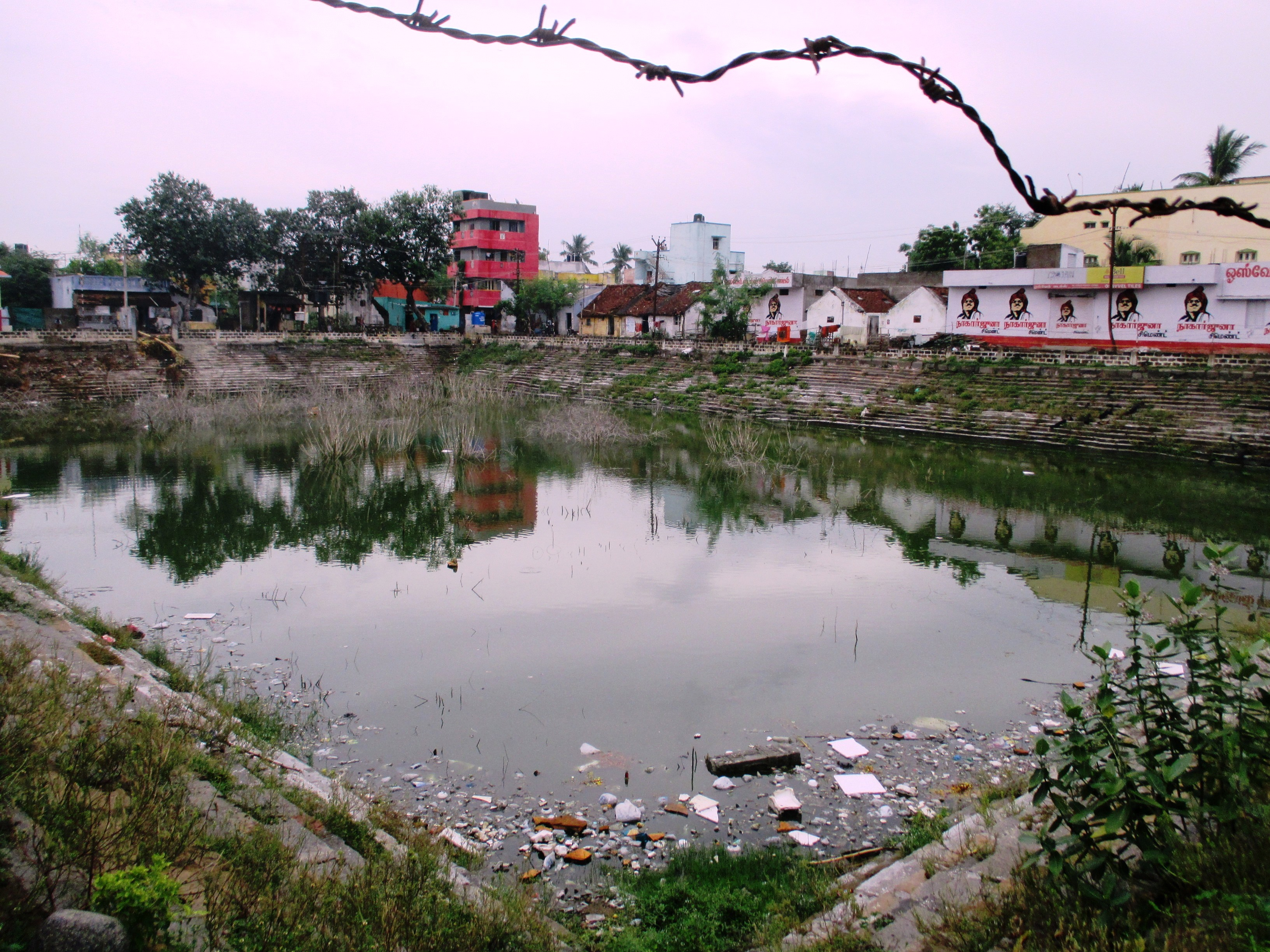
Temple tank where Poigai Alvar originated

The temple in Chinna Kanchipuram in eastern Kanchipuram, a town in the state of Tamil Nadu. As per historian Nagaswamy, the image made of stucco, is one of the rarest representations of the deity. The temple has two precincts with the second precinct enclosed by granite walls pierced by a five tiered rajagopuram (gateway tower).

== Religious importance ==
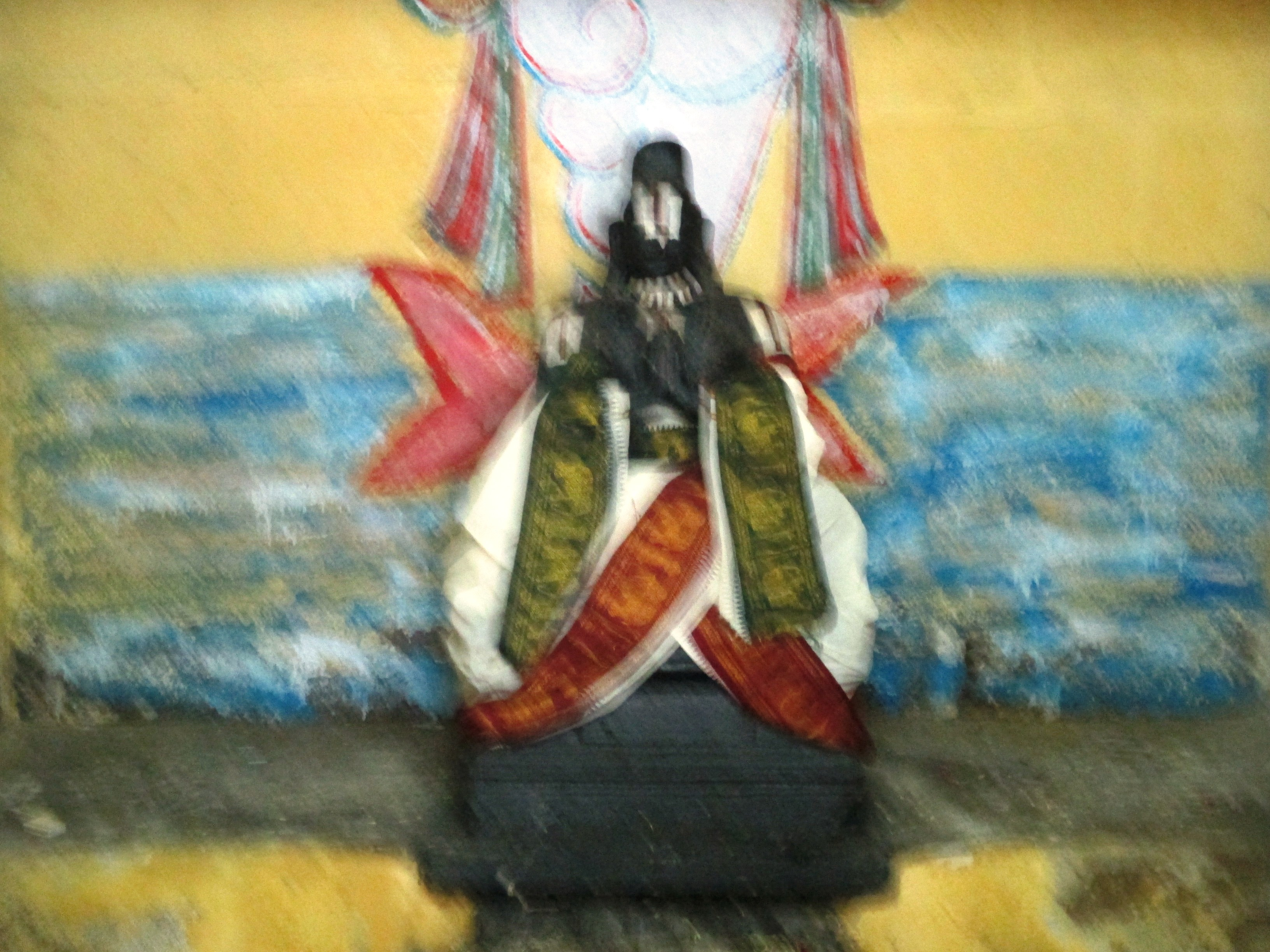
Poigai Alvar in the temple

This temple was the temple Vedanta Desika dedicated vegasetu stotram! The temple finds mention in Perumpaanatrupadai written by Patanjali. There is a mention about the temple in Silappatikaram (2nd-3rd century CE), Patanjali Mahabharatham and Tolkāppiyam (3rd century BCE). The temple is revered in Nalayira Divya Prabandham, the 7th–9th century Vaishnava canon, by Poigai Alvar, Peyalvar, Bhoothathalvar and Thirumalisai Avar. The Alvars have sung praise on the different forms of Yathothkari Peruamal. The temple is classified as a Divya Desam, one of the 108 Vishnu temples that are mentioned in the book.

The temple is considered the birthplace of Poigai Alvar, one of the first three Alvar saints. He was found in a small pond (called Poigai in Tamil) near the temple. The temple and the pond are thus considered holy as it is the birthplace of the saint.
