= Ulagalantha Perumal Temple =

Ulagalantha Perumal Temple may refer to several places:

- Ulagalantha Perumal Temple, Kanchipuram, a temple in Kanchipuram, Kanchipuram district, Tamil Nadu, India
- Ulagalantha Perumal Temple, Tirukoyilur, a temple in Tirukkoyilur, Tiruvannamalai district, Tamil Nadu, India
