= Kancheepuram Pacchaivannapperumal Temple =

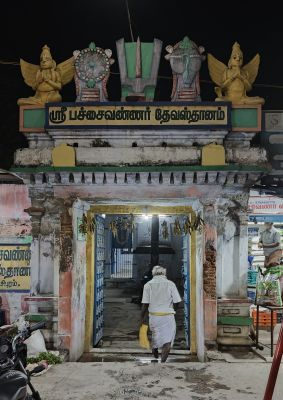
Pacchaivannapperumal Temple

Kancheepuram Pacchaivannapperumal Temple is a Vishnu temple located in Kanchipuram in Tamil Nadu, India.

== Primary deity ==
The primary deity of the temple is known as Pacchaivannapperumal, as he is green in colour. With the colour of Emerald he is in standing posture. The consort is known as Maragathavalli. Very near to this temple, one of the Divya Desams, Pavalavannam Temple is found.

== Festivals ==
In this temple Vaikasi Visakam, Tirumanchanam, and Vaikuntha Ekadashi are celebrated in a grand manner. To get rid of from puthra doka and Naga dosa devotees visit the temple.
