= Pandava Thoothar Perumal Temple =

Perumal temple in Kanchipuram district, Tamil Nadu, India

Pandavatutar Perumal Temple
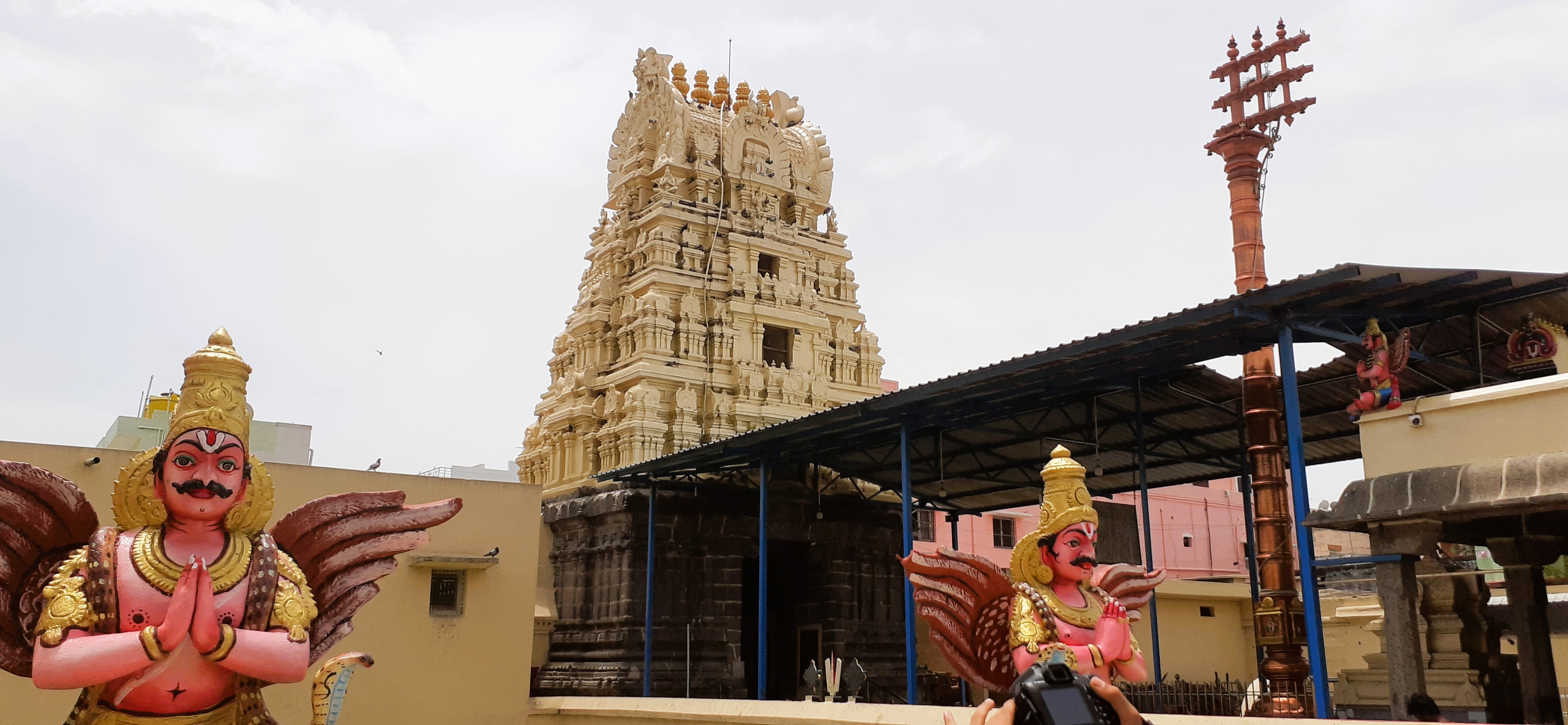
- Pandavatutar Perumal Temple

- Location in Tamil Nadu

Religion
- Affiliation: Hinduism
- District: Kanchipuram
- Deity: Pandava Tutar (Krishna) and Rukmini

Location
- Location: Kanchipuram
- State: Tamil Nadu
- Country: India
- Interactive map of Pandavatutar Perumal Temple
- Coordinates: 12°50′33″N 79°41′49″E

Architecture
- Type: Dravidian architecture
- Creator: Pallava
- Completed: 8th Century CE
- Inscriptions: Tamil

Pandavatutar Perumal Temple or Thirupadagam located in Kanchipuram in the South Indian state of Tamil Nadu, is dedicated to the Hindu god Krishna, an avatar of the god Vishnu. Constructed in the Dravidian style of architecture, the temple is extolled in the Nalayira Divya Prabandham, the early medieval Tamil canon of the Alvar saints from the 6th–9th centuries CE. It is one of the 108 Divya Desams dedicated to Vishnu, who is worshipped as Pandava Tutar Perumal (Krishna) and his consort Lakshmi (Rukmini).

The temple is considered one of three oldest temples in Kanchipuram; The other two oldest temples are Ulagalantha Perumal Temple and Yathothkari Perumal Temple. The temple is believed to have been built by the Pallavas of the late 8th century CE with later contributions from Medieval Cholas and Vijayanagara kings. The temple has three inscriptions on its walls, two dating from the period of Kulothunga Chola I (1070–1120 CE) and one to that of Rajadhiraja Chola (1018–1054 CE). A granite wall surrounds the temple, all the shrines, and two bodies of water. There is a four-tiered rajagopuram, the temple's gateway tower, in the temple.

Pandava Tutar is believed to have appeared to Pandava. Six daily rituals and three yearly festivals are held at the temple, of which the Krishna Janmashtami festival, celebrated during the Tamil month of Avani (August–September), being the most prominent. The temple is maintained and administered by the Hindu Religious and Endowment Board of the Government of Tamil Nadu.

== Legend ==
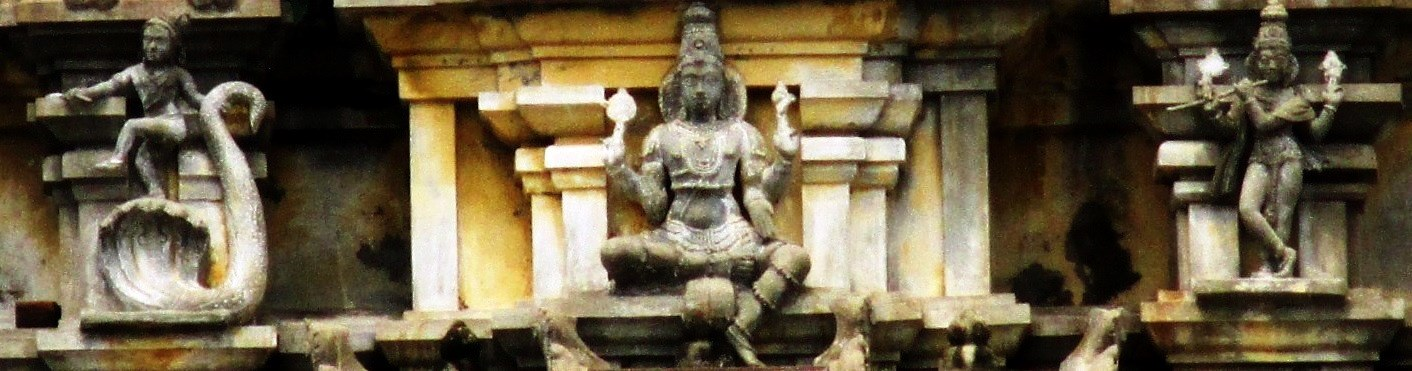
Stucco images on the Gopuram of the temple

The temple is associated with a Hindu legend in the epic Mahabharata, when Krishna went to the Kauravas as an envoy of the Pandavas (Pāṇḍavatūtar). Duryodhana, the eldest Kaurava prince, had a plan to arrest and kill Krishna while he was in the Kaurava capital of Hastinapura. He dug a deep pit and covered it with a carpet and a chair studded with gems. He had wrestlers hidden in the pit to wrangle Krishna. Krishna, being the avatar of Vishnu, assumed his vishvarupa, his cosmic form, to all the Kaurava courtiers, and also to Dhritarashtra, the blind king and father of Duryodhana. When Krishna offered a boon to Dhritarashtra, he requested Krishna to make him blind again as he did not want to see anything after seeing the vishvarupa. Krishna also appeared in the same form to Janamejaya, the great-grandson of the Pandavas, who performed austerities to receive the theophany.

Pada means big and Agam means residence, signifying Thirupadagam as the place where Vishnu resides with his giant form.

== History ==
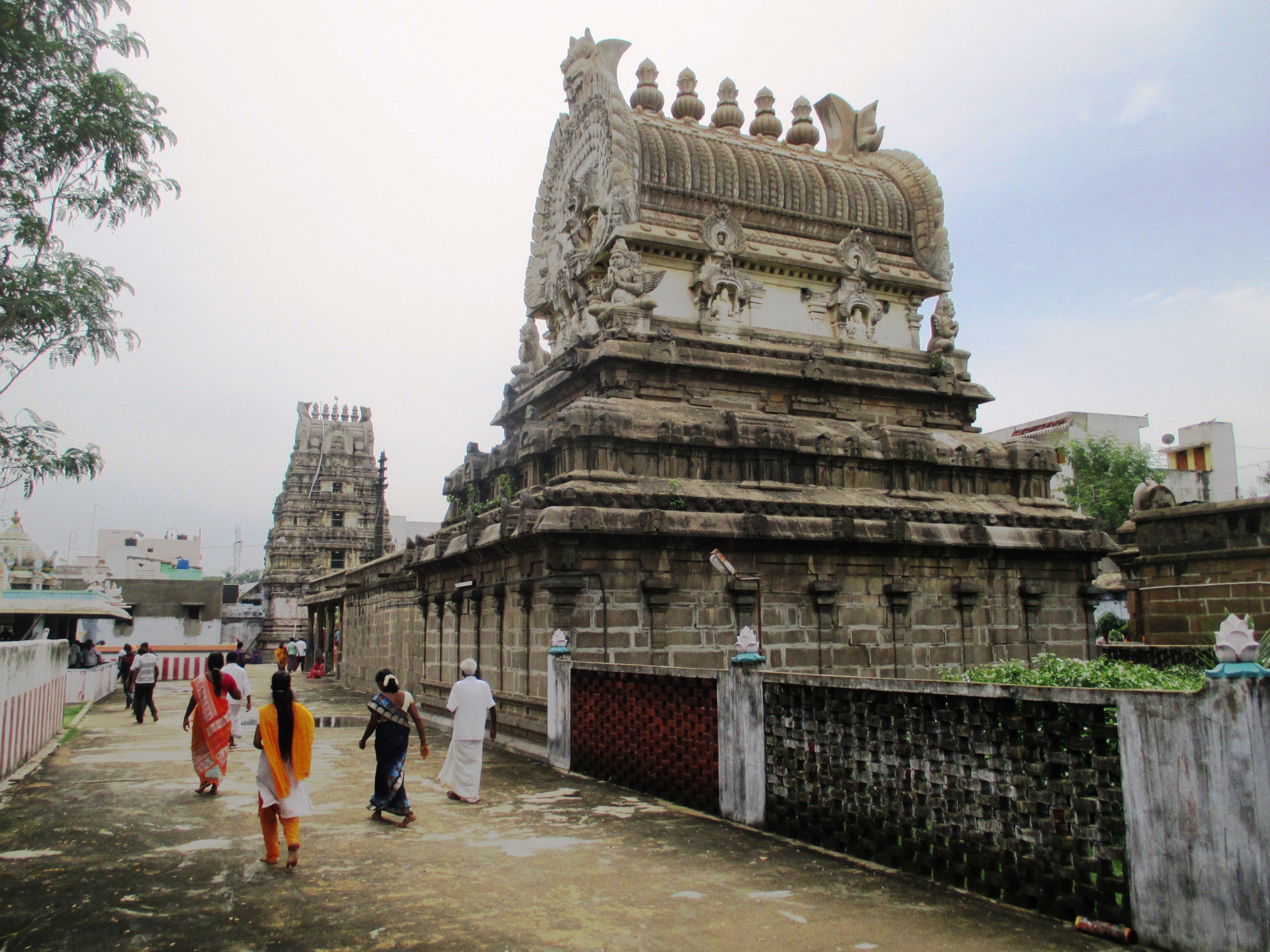
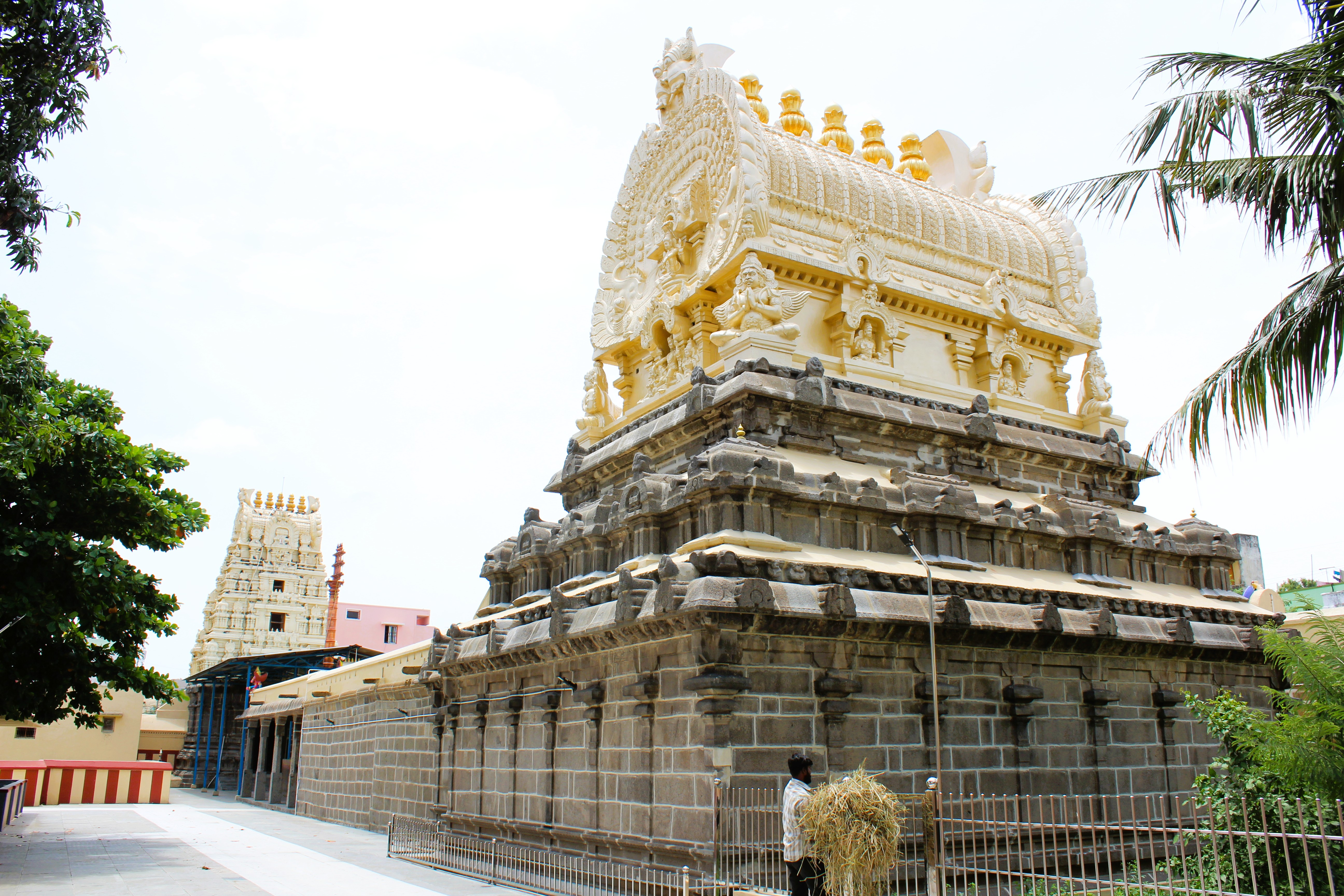
Old and new image of the shrine

The temple is considered one of three oldest Vishnu temples in Kanchipuram; The other two are Ulagalantha Perumal Temple and Yathothkari Perumal Temple. The temple is originally believed to be built during the period of Pallavas. The temple has a set of inscriptions associated with Cholas. A record of the Chola king, Rajakesari Varaman alais Kulothunga Chola I, dated in his fifth year. Records that a merchant provided the temple with a flower garden and purchased from the village of Ovirukkai some lands for the benefit of the gardeners. The cost of the 2,000 kulis(tax-free) was 11 kalanjus equal in finesse of Madhuranthaka madai and the assembly could not levy in consequences vellikasu, nirallai, silvari, sorumattu etc. The south wall of the temple has inscriptions of Kulothunga Chola I, dated in his 39th year. Records gift of two kalanjus and two manjadi by a merchant to the pujari (temple priest) who were to supply two malis of curd daily. There are inscriptions on the base of the western wall of the central shrine from the period of Rajadhiraja Chola II (1166-78 CE) indicating gifts of 32 cows for lighting lamps of the temple. . The temple is maintained and administered by the Hindu Religious and Endowment Board of the Government of Tamil Nadu.

== Architecture ==
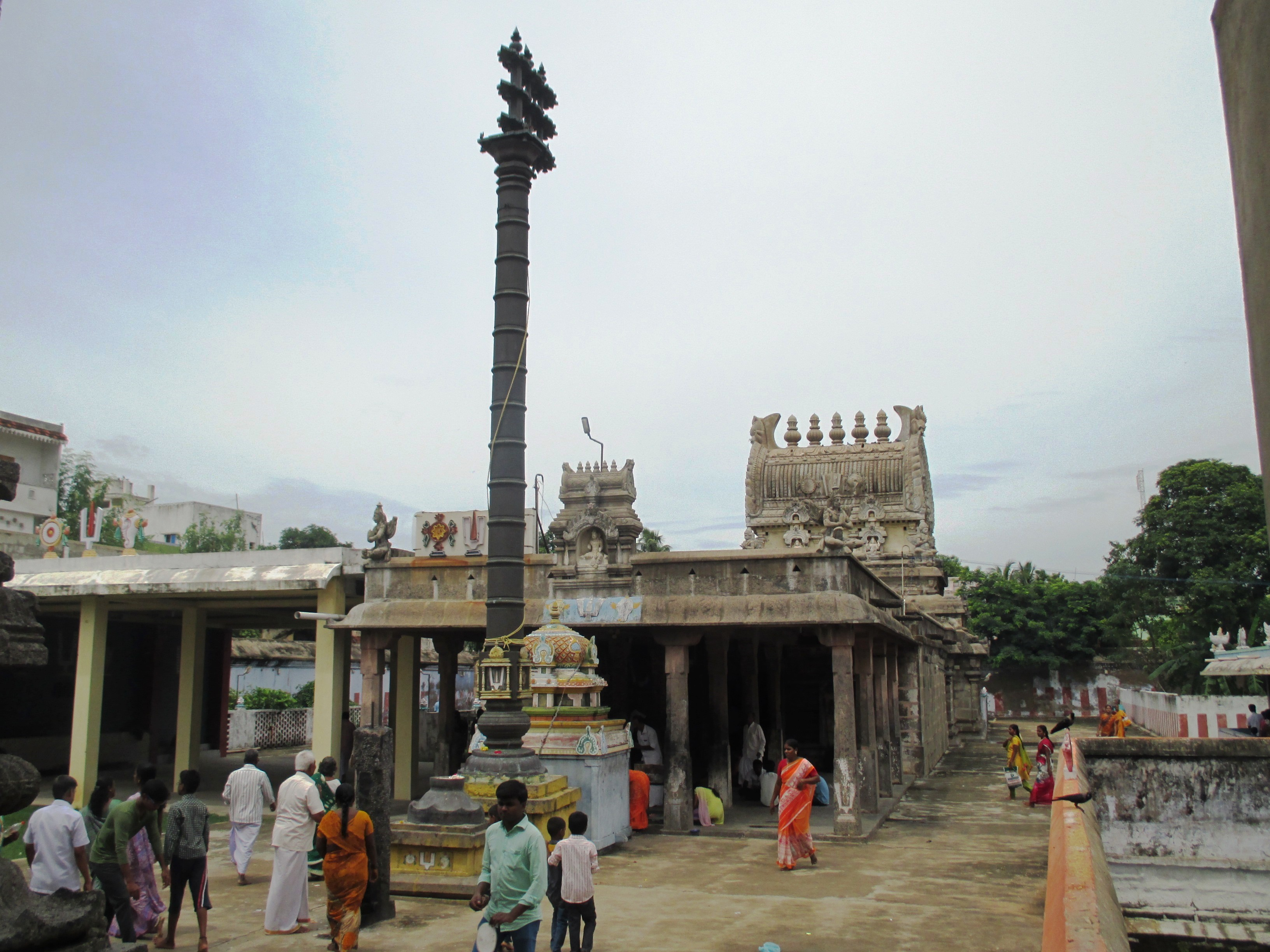
Image of the vimana

The temple in Periya Kanchipuram, a locality in central Kanchipuram, a South Indiann town in the state of Tamil Nadu. The main entrance of the temple faces east and the temple has a rectangular plan. The temple has a four-tiered rajagopuram and a single precinct enclosed in the walls. The Maha mandapa is believed to have been built by the Cholas, while the adjacent hall during the period of the Vijayanagara Empire.

The central shrine of the temple has a large image of the presiding deity Pandava Tutar, which is measured at a height of 25 ft (7.6 m). Such a large historical image of Krishna is unique, for the only idols of similar statures are the main idols of the Ulagalantha Perumal Temple, located in Kanchipuram and in Tirukoilur. The deity is seen seated in Arda Padmasana posture with his right leg bent to the basement. Since Krishna appeared in human form, the icon has only two arms, unlike other temples, where he is depicted with four or more hands. The right palm depicts the abhayamudra for protection and the left arm depicts Varadamudra for giving boon. The shrine faces east and the vimana of the temple is called Bhadra Vimana.

The preceding hall to the main sanctum, Mukha Mandapa, has bronze images of the festival deities of the temple and the Alvars. The most prominent of them is of Arulala Permula Emburamanar, the disciple of Ramanuja, whose image is rarely found in other Vishnu temples.

The Shrine of Rukmini is located to the south of the main shrine and has the image of Rukmini. There are modern additions like Chakratalvar with an image of Narasimha on it reverse located behind the main shrine. Matsya Tirtham, the temple tank, is located on the northeastern side of the temple.

== Festivals and religious practices ==
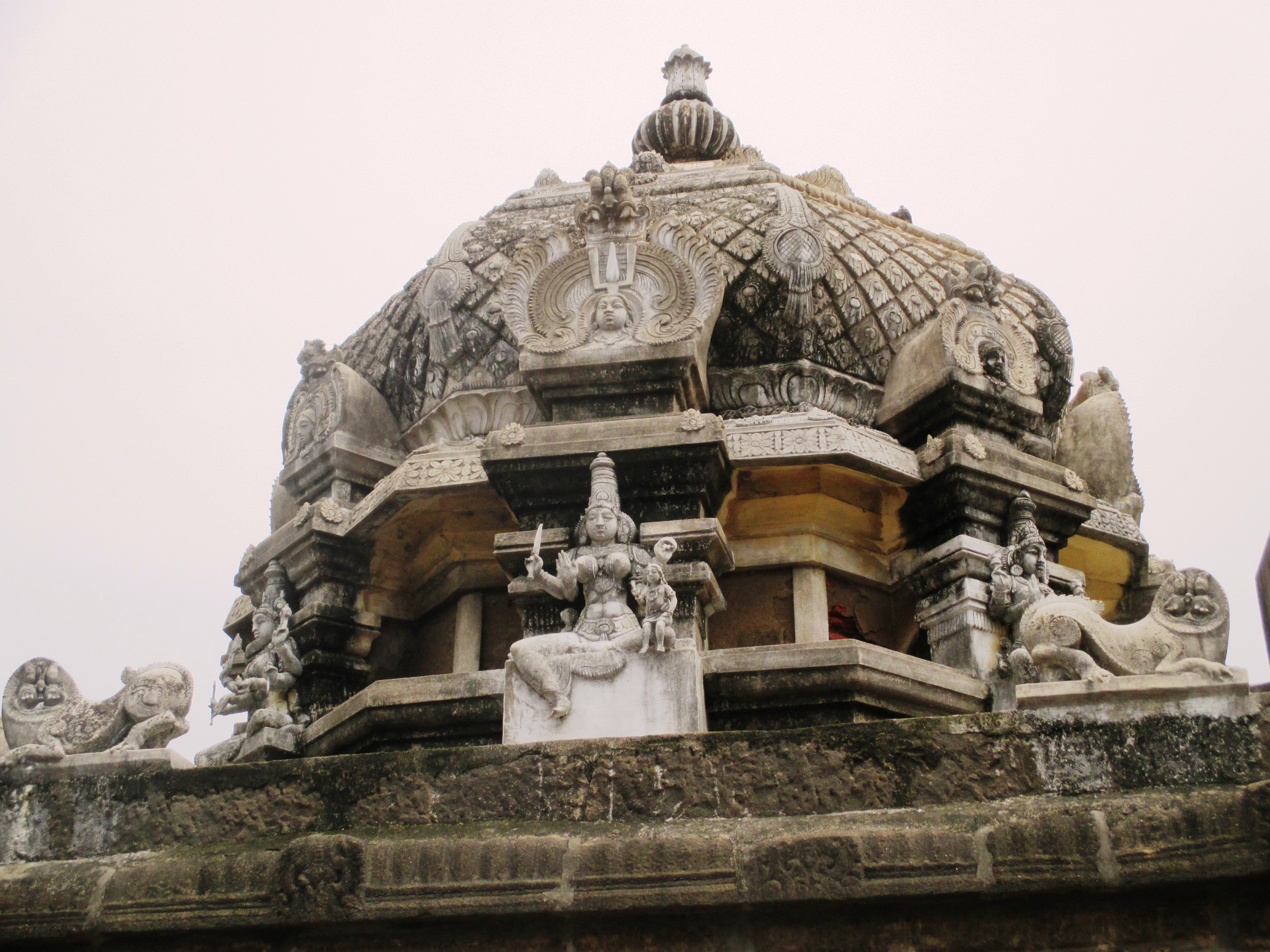
Image of the vimana of the Thayar shrine

The temple follows the traditions of the Tenkalai sect of Vaishnavite tradition and follows vaikanasa aagama. The temple priests perform the pooja (rituals) during festivals and on a daily basis. As at other Vishnu temples of Tamil Nadu, the priests belong to the Vaishnavaite community, from the Brahmin class. The temple rituals are performed six times a day: Ushathkalam at 7 a.m., Kalasanthi at 8:00 a.m., Uchikalam at 12:00 p.m., Sayarakshai at 6:00 p.m., Irandamkalam at 7:00 p.m. and Ardha Jamam at 10:00 p.m. Each ritual has three steps: alangaram (decoration), neivethanam (food offering) and deepa aradanai (waving of lamps) for both Pandava Tutar and Rukmini. During the last step of worship, nagaswaram (pipe instrument) and tavil (percussion instrument) are played, religious instructions in the Vedas (sacred text) are recited by priests, and worshippers prostrate themselves in front of the temple mast. There are weekly, monthly and fortnightly rituals performed in the temple.

The major festival of the temple is Krishna Janmasthami, celebrated during the Tamil month of Avani (August–September). The other major festival of the temple celebrated during Bharani of Karthikai (November–December) in honour of Arulala Peruman Emperumanar.

== Religious importance ==
The temple is revered in Nalayira Divya Prabandham, the 7th–9th century Vaishnava canon, by Peyalvar, Bhoothathalvar, Tirumalisai Alvar, Nammalvar, and Thirumangai Alvar. The Alvars have sung praise on the different forms of Pandava Tutar. The temple is classified as a Divya Desam, one of the 108 Vishnu temples that are mentioned in the book. Many acharyas have also written songs on the various forms of God in this Temple. Saint Emperumalar was believed to have been born in this place - he had a debate with saint Ramanuja for 18 days and finally became his disciple. There is a shrine dedicated to him in the temple.
