= Thirumazhisai =

Thirumazhisai, Chennai
- Suburb of Chennai
- Thirumazhisai (Chennai) Thirumazhisai, Chennai (Tamil Nadu) Thirumazhisai, Chennai (India)
- Coordinates: 13.052500°N 80.060300°E
- Country: India
- State: Tamil Nadu
- District: Thiruvallur
- Metro: Chennai

Area
  - Total: 6 km^{2} (2.3 sq mi)
- Elevation: 54 m (177 ft)

Population (2011)
  - Total: 19,733
  - Density: 3,300/km^{2} (8,500/sq mi)

Languages
  - Official: Tamil
- Time zone: UTC+5:30 (IST)
- PIN: 600 124
- Vehicle registration: TN 12 (RTO, Poonamallee)

Thirumazhisai is a western suburb of Chennai, India. It is located in Thiruvallur district of Tamil Nadu. Located on the way to Thiruvallur, the neighbourhood is situated at a distance of 28 km from the city's kilometer zero. The nearest railway station is at Thiruninravur, which is 13 km away.

The neighbourhood is the birthplace of Thirumalisai Alvar, one of the 12 Vaishnavite poet-saints of the Bhakti era.

== Landmarks ==
- Jagannatha Perumal temple also known as Thirumazhisai Alwar temple.
- Othandeeswarar temple: A Shiva temple
