= Jagannatha Perumal temple =

Vishnu temple in Tiruvallur

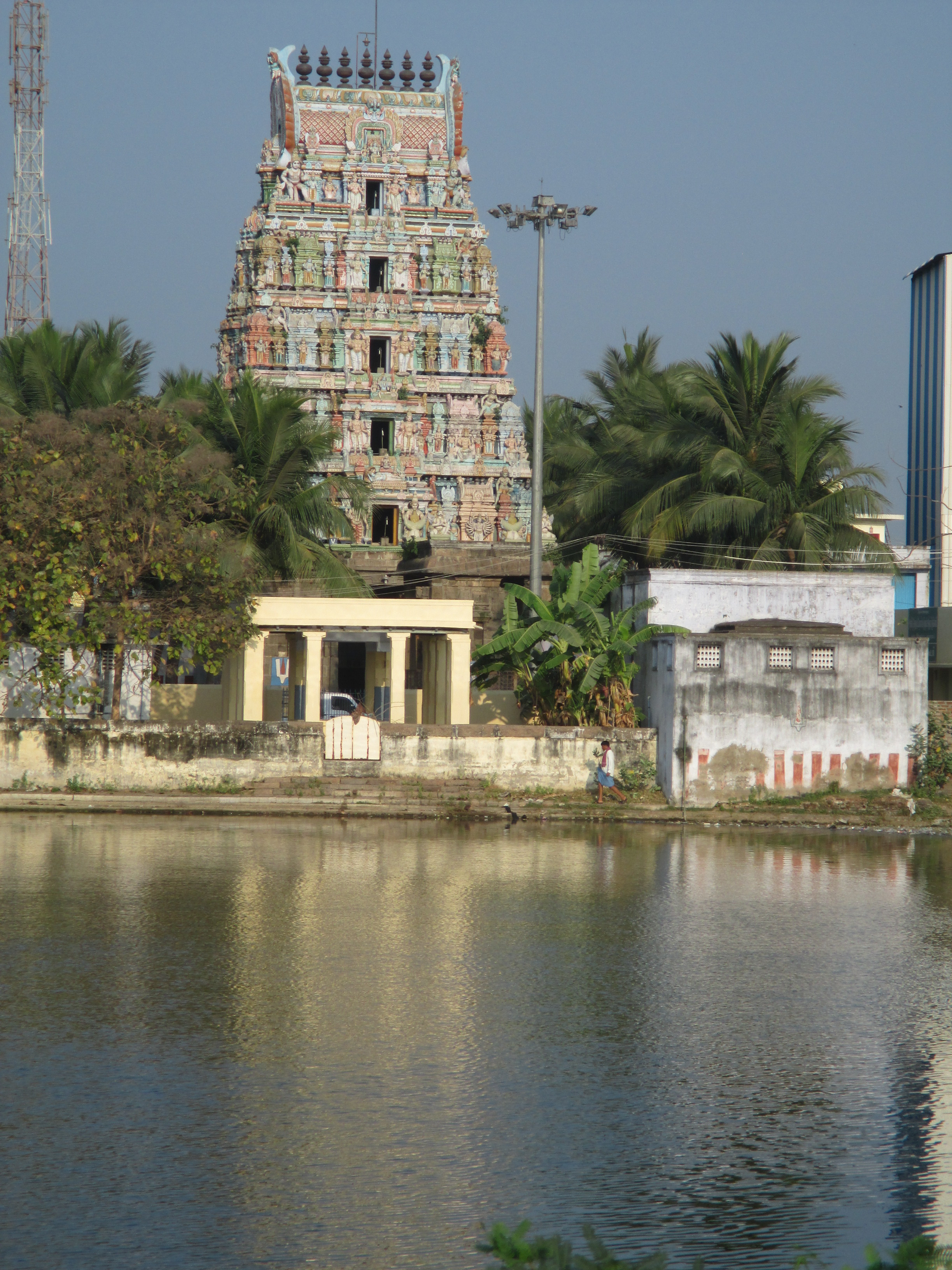

- Location in Tamil Nadu

Religion
- Affiliation: Hinduism
- District: Tiruvallur
- Deity: Jagannatha Perumal (Vishnu) Thirumangaivalli (Lakshmi)

Location
- Location: Chennai
- State: Tamil Nadu
- Country: India
- Coordinates: 13°03′08″N 80°03′40″E

Architecture
- Type: Dravidian architecture

Jagannatha Perumal Temple (also called Tirumazhisai) Temple is dedicated to Hindu god Vishnu in Tirumazhisai, Chennai City, Tiruvallur district, in the South Indian state of Tamil Nadu. Constructed in the Dravidian style of architecture, dedicated to Vishnu, who is worshipped as Jagannatha Perumal and his consort Lakshmi as Thirumangaivalli. The temple is classified as one of the 108 Abhimana Kshethram of Vaishnavate tradition.

The temple is open daily and is maintained and administered by the Hindu Religious and Endowment Board of the Government of Tamil Nadu.

== Legend ==
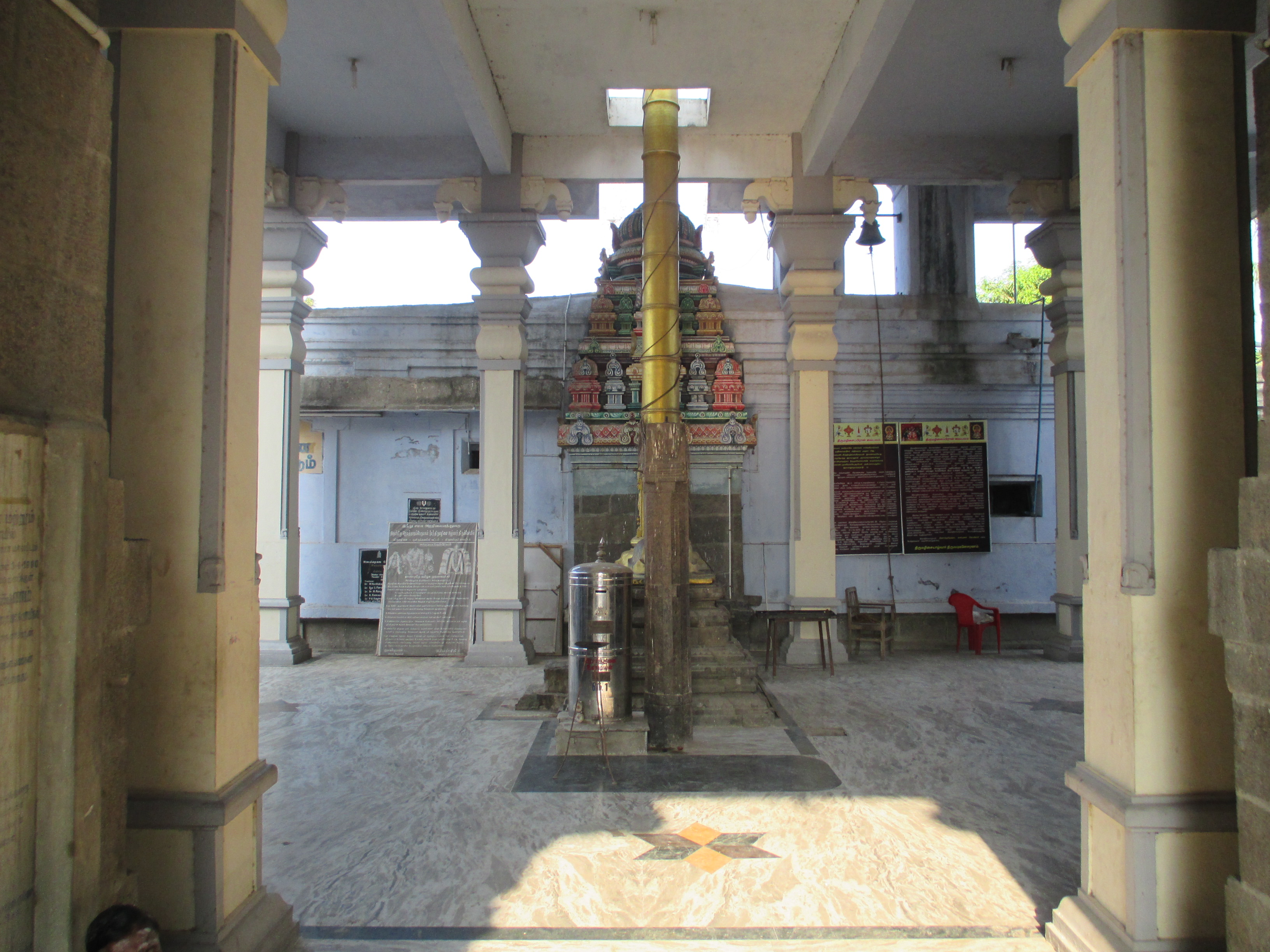
Entrance of the temple

According to the Hindu legend, the Saptarishis, the seven sages, wanted to have a view of Madhya Jagannatha (literally meaning Jagannatha located in the middle). As per Hindu legend, the Jaganatha at Puri Jagannatha Temple is called Vada Jagannatha (located in the North) and the one located in Adi Jagannatha Perumal Temple at Thirupullani is called Keeḻa Jagannatha. Acceding to the request of the sages, Vishnu is believed to have appeared as Madhya Jagannatha at this place. The place is also believed to be the birthplace of Thirumalisai Alvar, one of the twelve Alvars whose work is compiled as Divya Prabandha, the early medieval Tamil canon of the Alvar saints from the 6th–9th centuries CE. His works include Tiruvanthai and Tiruchanda Viruttam, which are included in the canon.

== History ==
Thirumazhisai was originally called by various names like Chrukuravalli-Chaturvedimanagalam, Pakkaturaivalla-Chaturvedimangalam, Mahisaram and Mahaksehtram on account of the number of Vedic people settled here during the Chola and Vijayanagara period. The inscriptions on the walls of the temple are from the chola regime during the 11-12th centuries and Vijayanagara period during the 14-15th centuries. The inscriptions are made in Tamil or in ancient Tamil scripts indicating gift of land, lamps and houses to the temple. The oldest inscription is found from the period of Kulothunga Chola III (1179-1216 CE) indicating gift of land to the temple. Vijaya Gandagopala, a chieftain during the 12th century has endowed gifts to the temple. There are also inscriptions from the period of Kopperunjinga during the 13th century. Harihara Raya II (1377-1404 CE) and Virupaksha Raya II (1465-85 CE), the rulers of the Vijayanagara Empire have donated gifts to the temple as indicated in the inscriptions. In modern times, the temple is maintained and administered by the Hindu Religious and Endowment Board of the Government of Tamil Nadu.

== Architecture ==
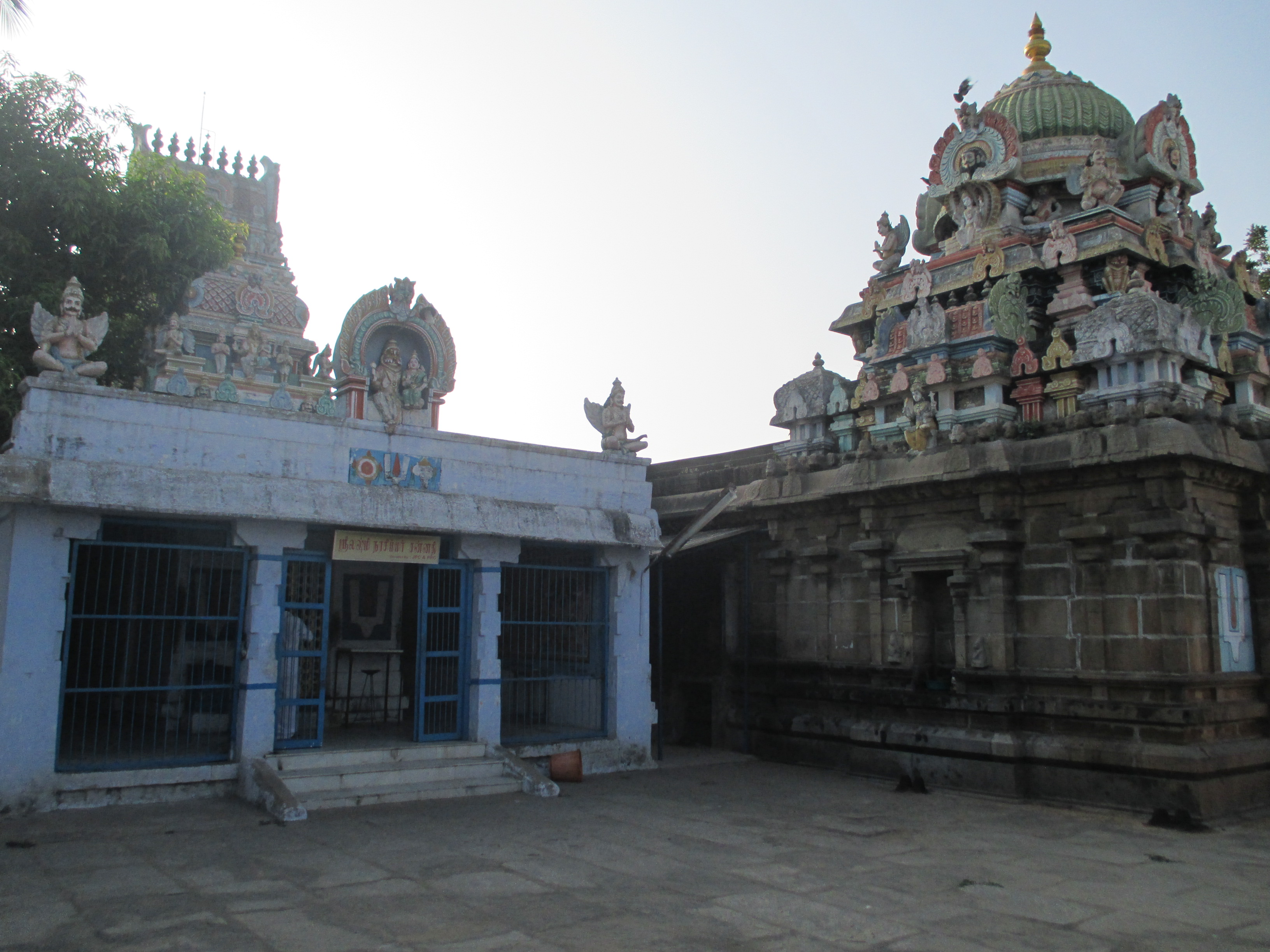
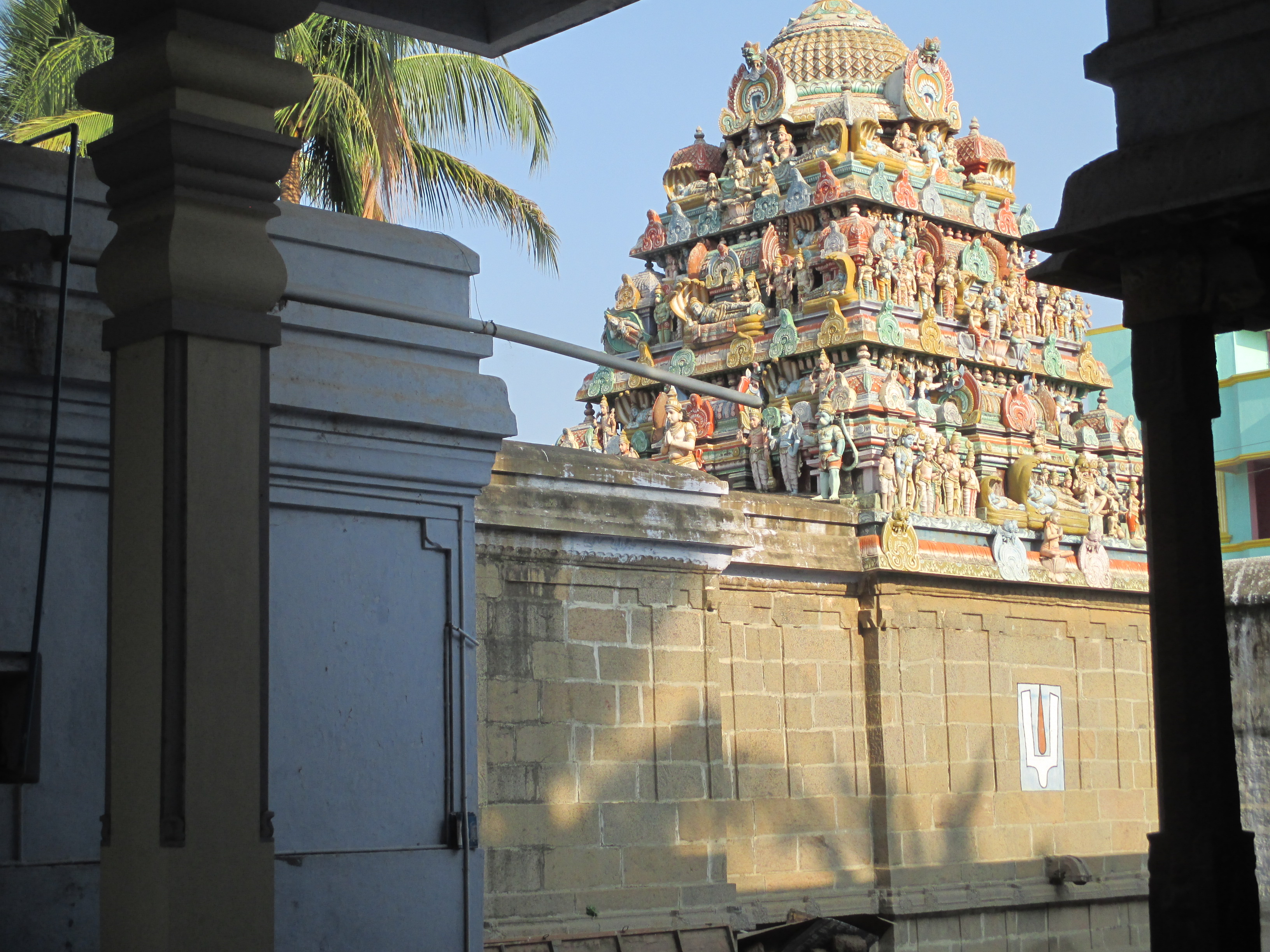
Two shrines of the temple

The temple is built in Dravidian architecture occupies around 1.5 acres (0.61 ha) and has two precincts. It is located in Tirumalisai, a suburb in Tiruvallur, the capital of the South Indian state of Tamil Nadu. The temple has a rectangular plan surrounded by 10 ft (3.0 m) high walls, pierced by a five-tier gopuram, the gateway tower. The presiding deity housed in the sanctum, is an image made of granite seen in seated posture with his right leg bent and left leg left hanging. The images of Rukmini and Satyabhama are located on either of his sides. The shrine of Garuda facing Jagannatha Perumal, the eagle mount of Vishnu, is located axial to the central shrine. The central shrine is approached through Mahamandapa, the worship hall and a narrow Ardha mandapam. The Mahamandapa has a twenty eight pillared hall with sculptured pillars depicting Vaishnava mythology. The flagpost is located behind the shrine of Garuda, axial to the central shrine and the gateway tower. There are images of Alvars in the worship hall on both sides and the shrine of Yathirajavalli is located in the second precinct. The vimana, the roof over the sanctum, has stucco images of Hayagriva, Lakshmi Narasimha and Garuda. The northern side of the Mahamandapa has the shrine of Thirumalisai Alvar, which houses the image of the Alvar in seated posture with his hands sported with praying gesture. The second precinct has the shrine of Thirumangaivalli Thayar. There are other shrines in the temple dedicated to Lakshmi Narasimha, Manavala Mamunigal and Andal. There is a four pillared hall in front of the gopuram having sculpted images in the pillars from the Vijayanagara period. There is a Kalayana Mandapa, Vahana Mandapa for housing the divine vehicles and a Paramapada vasal.

== Worship practices and festivals ==
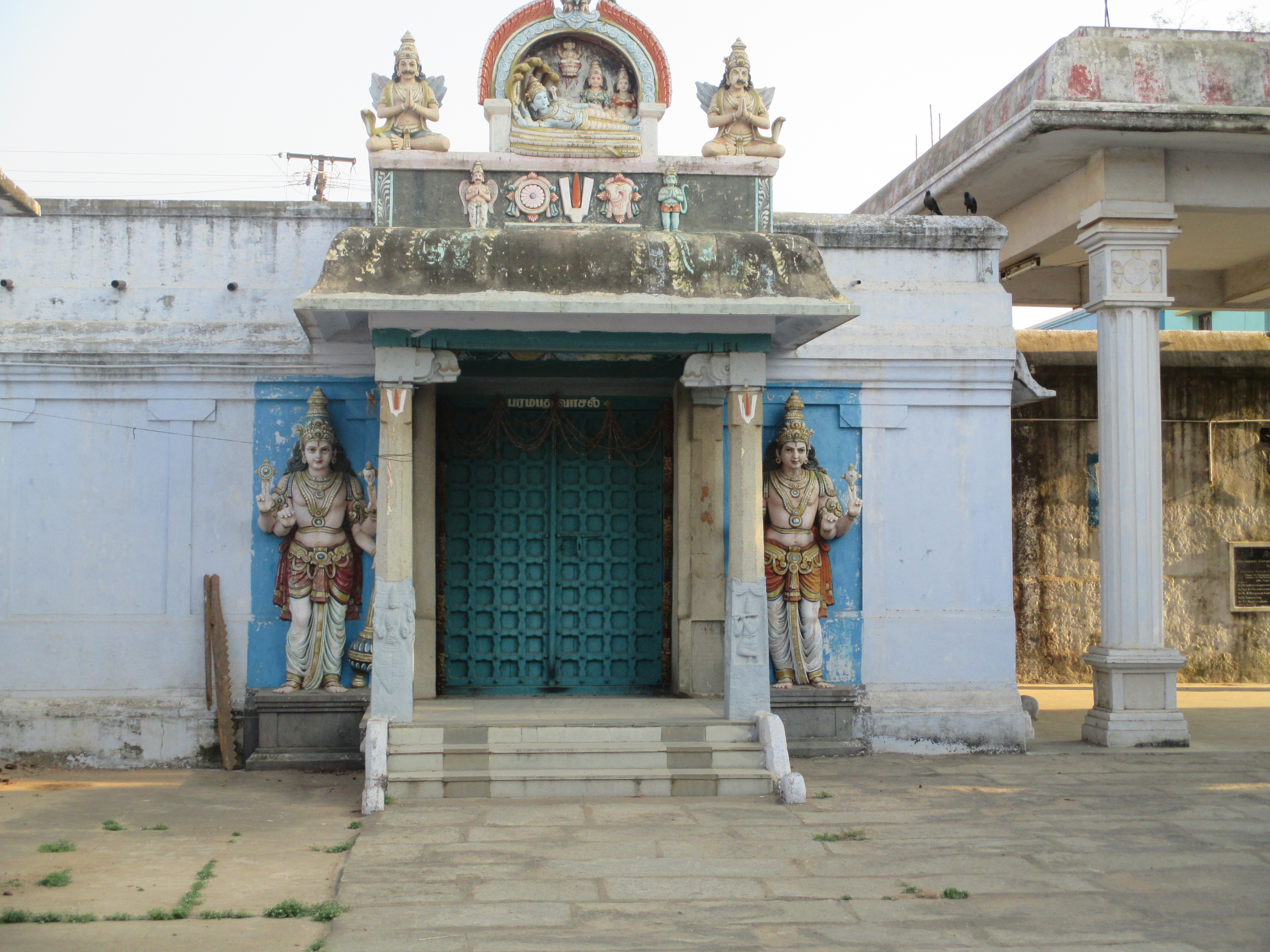
Paramapadavasal, opened during 10-day Vaikunta Ekadasi festival

The temple follows the Tenkalai tradition of worship based on Vaikasana Agamic tradition.

Festivals celebrated there include Aani Brahmotsavam in June - July, Aipasi Manavala Maamuni in October - November and Maasi float festival in February - March when the presiding deities are drawn in a float in the temple tank. The temple is maintained and administered by the Hindu Religious and Endowment Board of the Government of Tamil Nadu.
