= Tirumalisai Alvar =

Tamil poet-saint

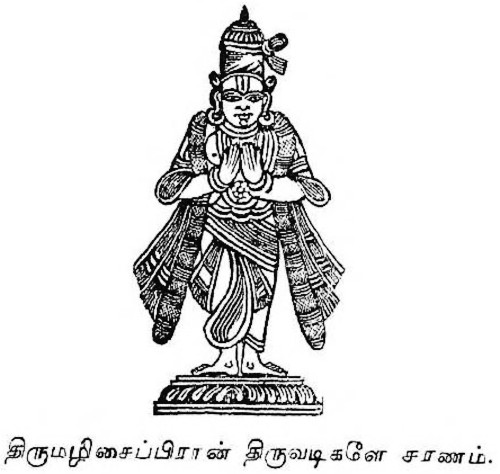
- Title: Alvar

Personal life
- Born: Thirumalisai
- Notable work(s): Tiruchanda Viruttam, Nanmukan Tiruvantati

Religious life
- Religion: Hinduism
- Philosophy: Vaishnavism

Religious career
- Teacher: Vishvaksena

Tirumalisai Alvar (IAST) is a Tamil saint revered in the Sri Vaishnavism school of south India between the 4th to 9th century CE, in Tondai Nadu (now part of Kanchipuram and Tiruvallur districts). The legend of this saint devotees of Sri Vaishnavism believe that he was the incarnation of Vishnu's disc, Sudarshana. He is believed to have been born at the Jagannatha Perumal temple, Tirumalisai, by "divine grace".

Historically, Tirumalisai Alvar is regarded to have been the son of a sage.

== Alvars ==
The word Alvar means the one who dives deep into the ocean of the countless attributes of god. Alvars are considered to have been the twelve supreme devotees of Vishnu, who were instrumental in popularising Vaishnavism in South India. The religious works of these saints in Tamil, songs of love and devotion, are compiled as Naalayira Divya Prabandham containing 4000 verses and the 108 temples revered in their songs are classified as Divya desam. The saints had different origins and belonged to different castes. As per tradition, the first three Alvars, Poigai, Bhutha and Pey were born miraculously. Tirumalisai was the son of a sage, Thondaradi, Mathurakavi, Periyalvar and Andal were from the Brahmin community, Kulasekhara from Kshatriya community, Nammalvar was from a cultivator family, Tirupana from the panar community and Tirumangai from kalvar community. Divya Suri Saritra by Garuda-Vahana Pandita (11th century CE), Guruparamparaprabavam by Pinbaragiya Perumal Jiyar, Periya tiru mudi adaivu by Anbillai Kandadiappan, Yatindra Pranava Prabavam by Pillai Lokacharya, commentaries on Divya Prabandam, Guru Parampara (lineage of Gurus) texts, temple records and inscriptions give a detailed account of the Alvars and their works. According to these texts, the saints were considered incarnations of some form of Vishnu. Poigai is considered an incarnation of Panchajanya (Krishna's conch), Bhoothath of Kaumodakee (Vishnu's Mace/Club), Pey of Nandaka (Vishnu's sword), Thirumalisai of Sudarshanam (Vishnu's discus), Namm of Vishvaksena (Vishnu's commander), Madhurakavi of Vainatheya (Vishnu's eagle, Garuda), Kulasekhara of Kaustubha (Vishnu's necklace), Periy of Garuda (Vishnu's eagle), Andal of Bhoodevi (Vishnu's wife, Lakshmi, in her form as Bhudevi), Thondaradippodi of Vanamaalai (Vishnu's garland), Thiruppaan of Srivatsa (An auspicious mark on Vishnu's chest) and Thirumangai of Saranga (Rama's bow). The songs of Prabandam are regularly sung in all the Vishnu temples of South India daily and also during festivals.

== Early life ==
The name of the Alvar comes from his birthplace, Tirumalisai, a suburb in modern-day Chennai. The Alvar was born to Bhargava maharishi and an apsara, Kanakangi, after an unusual 12 months stay in the womb. The foetus came out as just a lifeless lump of flesh with no arms and legs. The couple were terribly depressed and with unwillingness left it under a bamboo bush and proceeded with their spiritual journey. Vishnu appeared with Lakshmi and blessed the "flesh" with their kataksham and it turned into an lively human being.

He was later picked up with both the arms affectionately by a tribal named Thiruvalan. A really blessed couple Thiruvalan and pankajavalli, was overwhelmed by the grace of god for this gift of a baby. The boy grew on to become Tirumalisai Alvar. He also has an eye on his right leg. He lived up to 10 years of age in a hamlet near Tirumalisai village named as Pirayampathu. This Alvar was an incarnation of Sudarsana Chakra ( the divine discus of Lord Vishnu).

Tirumalisai Alvar decided to learn about all other religions. He also got initiated into Vaishnavism by Pey Alvar. After visiting several temples, he reached Tiruvekka, the birthplace of Poigai Alvar.

== Displeasing the Pallava king ==
Legend also says that when Kanikannan, his disciple displeased the pallava king for not agreeing to restore the king's youth. Earlier on he granted youth to an old unmarried maid of the temple. The king married that woman but he himself was an old man and thus wanted to enjoy life as a youth with his new wife. Tirumalisai refused him and the king decided to banish him. Tirumalisai Alvar asked the God from the temple, Yathotkari, to leave with him.

Tamil

கணிகண்ணன் போகின்றான் காமரு பூங் கச்சி
மணிவண்ணா! நீ கிடக்க வேண்டா
செந்நாப் புலவனும் போகின்றேன் நீயும் உன்றன்
பை நாகப்பாயை சுருட்டிக் கொள்

Transliteration

KanikaNNan Poginraan Kaamaru poong Kachi
ManivaNNaa! Nee Kidakka Vendaa
Sennaap Pulavanum Poginren Neeyum Unran
Pai Naagappaayai Suruttik KoLL

KanikaNNan is going out of kAnchi Oh! Manivanna!, You don't have to lie here anymore. Since, as the fluent poet that I am also leaving with him, you also roll your serpent bed and follow me"And, accordingly all of them left KAnchipuram

Vishnu is said to have rolled up the snake Sesha like a mattress and left with him.

== Mangalasasanam ==
There are 216 of his paasurams in the 4000 Divya Prabhandham. His first Prabandham named Tiruchanda Viruttam contains 120 hymns and starts from 752 paasuram and ends at 871 paasuram. The second Prabandham of Tirumalisai Alvar is titled Naanmugan Thiruvandhadhi and it contains 96 verses. The work of Naanmugan Thiruvandhadhi starts from 2382 paasuram and ends at 2477 paasuram.

He has sung in praise of 20 temples.

S.No.	Name of the temple	Location	Photo	Presiding deity	Notes/Beliefs
1	Thiru Kapistalam	10.946°N 79.256°E			
2	Thiru Anbil	Anbil; Tiruchirappalli district 10.86°N 78.88°E		Sundararaja Perumal; Azhagiya Nambi Perumal	The temple is located on the Northern bank of the river Kollidam, at a distance of 25 km (16 mi) from Trichy. King Sundara Chola who ruled the area was a devotee of the temple and during each of his innumerable victories in wars, he showered a lot of wealth on this temple. His prime minister Anirudha Brahmarayar is believed to be from Anbil, the village where the temple is located. The copper plates having the records from the Chola period from Anbil indicate generous contribution from the Medieval Cholas indicate various gifts to the temple.
3	Thiruevvul	13.143°N 79.907°E			
4	Thiruuragam	12.839°N 79.705°E			
5	Thiruvallikeni	13.053884°N 80.277020°E			
6	Thirupper Nagar	10.839282°N 78.889070°E			
7	Thirukkurungudi	8.436096°N 77.565933°E			
8	Tiruvekkaa	12.824°N 79.712°E			
9	Tiruppatakam	12.842°N 79.696°E			
10	Thirukoshtiyur	10.060°N 78.560°E			
11	Thirukkudandhai	10.959°N 79.375°E			
12	Thiruvenkadam	13.683304°N 79.347406°E			
13	Tirupparkatal				
14	Srirangam	Srirangam, Trichy district Tamil Nadu; 10.8625°N 78.689722°E		Ranganayagi; Ranganathar (Periya Perumal)	Srirangam temple is often listed as the largest functioning Hindu temple in the world, the still larger Angkor Wat being the largest existing temple. The temple occupies an area of 156 acres (631,000 m²) with a perimeter of 4,116m (10,710 feet) making it the largest temple in India and one of the largest religious complexes in the world. The annual 21-day festival conducted during the Tamil month of Margazhi (December–January) attracts 1 million visitors.
15	Azhagar Kovil	10.074°N 78.213°E			
16	Appakkudathaan Perumal Temple	Koviladi, Trichy district Tamil Nadu; 10.86°N 78.88°E		Indravalli; Appala Ranganatha Perumal	The temple has inscriptions from the 18th year of the reign of Aditya Chola. The recorded inscriptions in this temple are numbered 283, 300, 301 and 303 of 1901. The temple is one of the five Pancharanga Kshetrams (also called Pancharangams, meaning the "five Rangams or Ranganathas"), a group of five Hindu temples on the banks of the Kaveri River dedicated to Ranganatha, a form of Vishnu.
