= Pavalavannam Temple =

Hindu temple in Kanchipuram

Tirupavalavannam
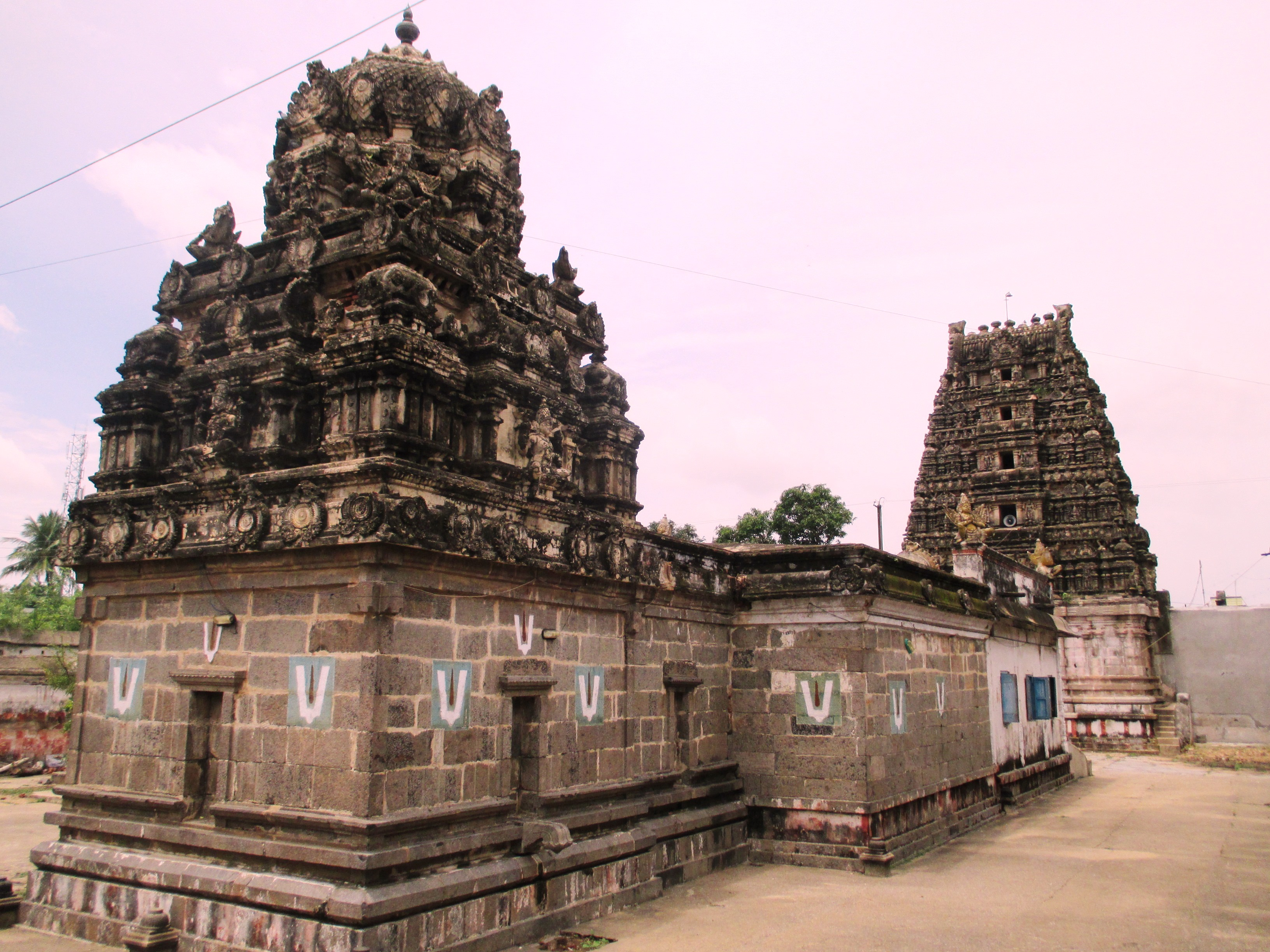

- Location in Tamil Nadu

Religion
- Affiliation: Hinduism
- District: Kanchipuram
- Deity: Pavalavanna Perumal (Vishnu); Pavalavalli Thayar (Lakshmi)
- Features: Temple tank: Chakra Theertham

Location
- Location: Kanchipuram
- State: Tamil Nadu
- Country: India
- Interactive map of Tirupavalavannam
- Coordinates: 12°50′40″N 79°42′16″E

Architecture
- Type: Dravidian architecture

Tirupavalavannam or Pavalavanam temple located in Kanchipuram in the South Indian state of Tamil Nadu, is dedicated to the Hindu god Vishnu. Constructed in the Dravidian style of architecture, the temple is glorified in the Nalayira Divya Prabandham, the early medieval Tamil canon of the Alvar saints from the 6th–9th centuries CE. It is one of the 108 Divya Desams dedicated to Vishnu, who is worshipped as Pavalavannar Perumal and his consort Lakshmi as Pavalavalli.

The temple is believed to have been built by the Cholas, with later contributions from Medieval Cholas and Vijayanagara kings. The temple has three inscriptions on its walls, two dating from the period of Kulothunga Chola I (1070–1120 CE) and one to that of Rajadhiraja Chola (1018-54 CE). A granite wall surrounds the temple, enclosing all the shrines and two bodies of water. There is a seven-tiered rajagopuram, the temple's gateway tower, in the temple.

Pavalavannar is believed to have appeared to sage Naimisaranya. Six daily rituals and three yearly festivals are held at the temple, of which the Brahmotsavam festival, celebrated during the Tamil month of Vaikasi (May - June), being the most prominent. The temple is maintained and administered by the Hindu Religious and Endowment Board of the Government of Tamil Nadu.

== Legend ==
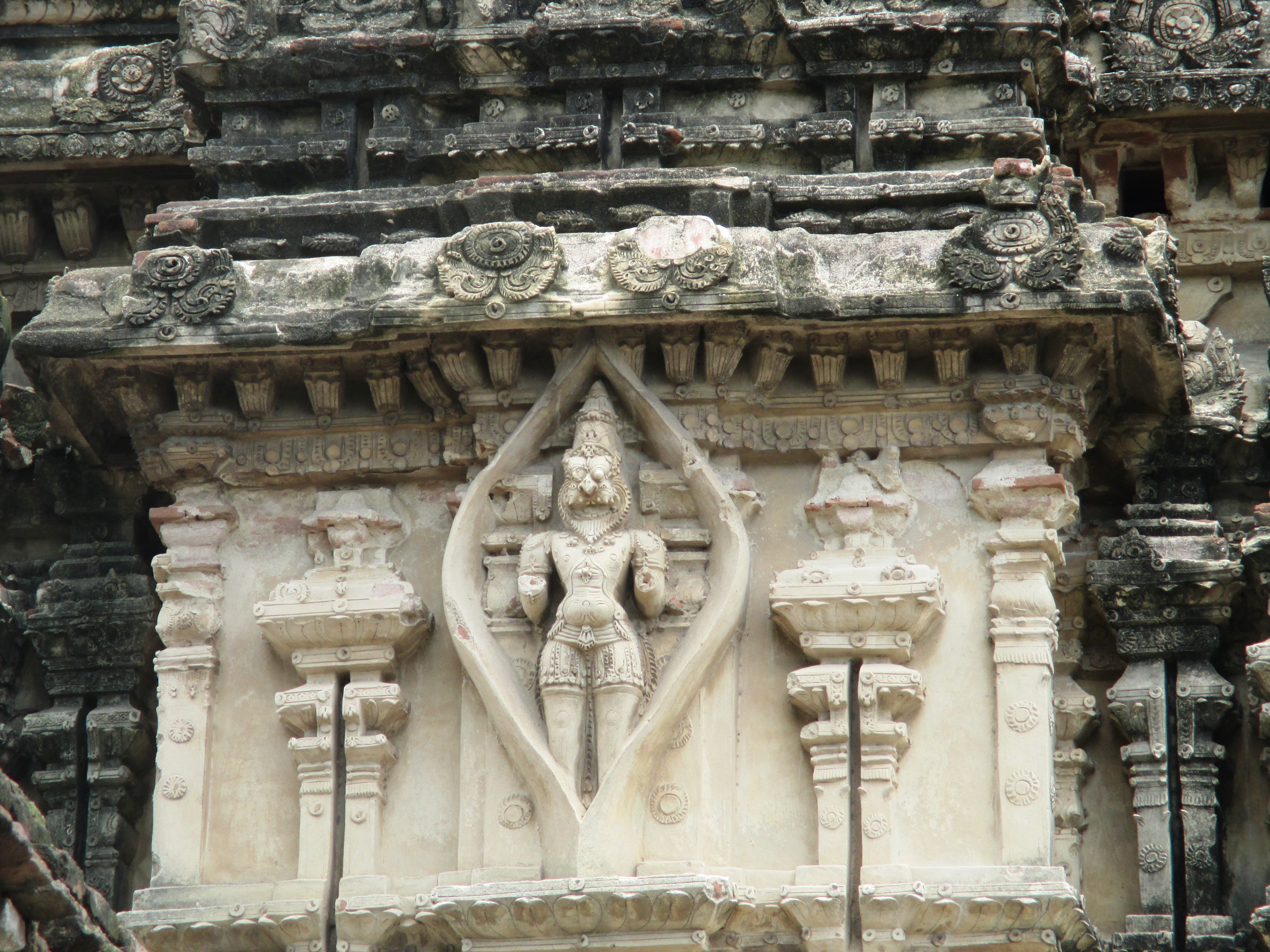
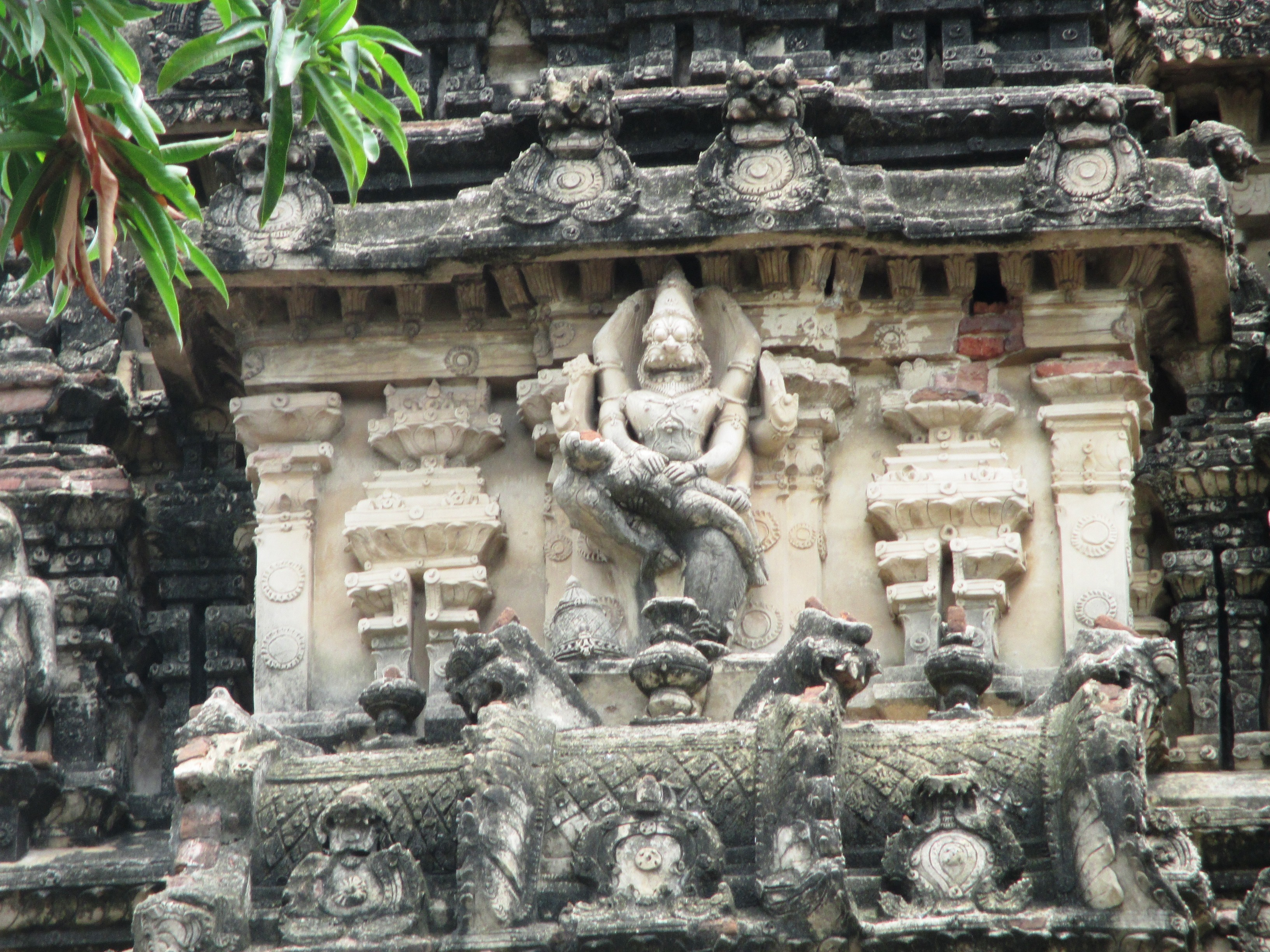
Stucco images of the legend of Narasimha

The regional legend of this temple states that Vishnu assumed various colours during various eras according to the nature of the living beings and their behaviour. During Satya Yuga, people were well-behaved (satvaguna) and Vishnu was white (called svetavarna) in colour. During Treta Yuga, he assumed the colour of pavalam (emerald) and hence came to be known as Pavalavannar or Pralavannar (in Sanskrit). In the Dvapara Yuga, he assumed green colour (pachai in Tamil). In the current Kali Yuga, he assumed blue tint called syamalavarna and it is believed that people will not be influenced by the form Vishnu appears. Vishnu is believed to have appeared for twin Ashvini twins as Pavalavannar and hence retains the name in modern times.

As per another legend, Saraswati, the goddess of knowledge in Hinduism, wanted to stop the penance of her husband Brahma. She sent an army of demons to attack him. Vishnu stood up to save his devotee Brahma and was smeared with blood red colour. He was called Pravalesa and Pavalvannan, the colour of emerald in Tamil. There is another temple named Pachaivannan, which is located axially across the road and these two twin temples are mentioned together.

== History ==
The temple has various inscriptions from the Chola (10th -12th centuries) and Vijayanagara period (15-16th centuries). The temple is originally believed to be built during the period of Medieval Cholas. In modern times, the temple was maintained and administered by hereditary trustees, but a litigation during the 2014 from the Chennai High Court split the control between the trustee and the Hindu Religious and Endowment Board of the Government of Tamil Nadu. Among the 12 Alvars (the poet-saints of the Sri Vaishnava tradition) three of them namely Peyalvar, Thirumalisai Alvar and Thirumangai Alvar have sung on the different forms of God in this temple. Many acharyas have also written songs on the various forms of God in this Temple. The temple faces the west. As per another legend, sage Bhrigu was doing his penance and wanted to find out whom among the trio of Brahma, Vishnu and Shiva would be the most accommodating when their patience was tested. Out of the three, he found Vishnu to be the most accommodating who in spite of the sage kicking him, went on to massage his legs for pain relief. The sage felt ashamed of his act, but Vishnu asked him to go to Kanchipuram to complete his penance. Vishnu appeared as Pavalavannar to the sage. The image of the sage is seen in the sanctum in worshiping posture inside the sanctum.

== Architecture ==
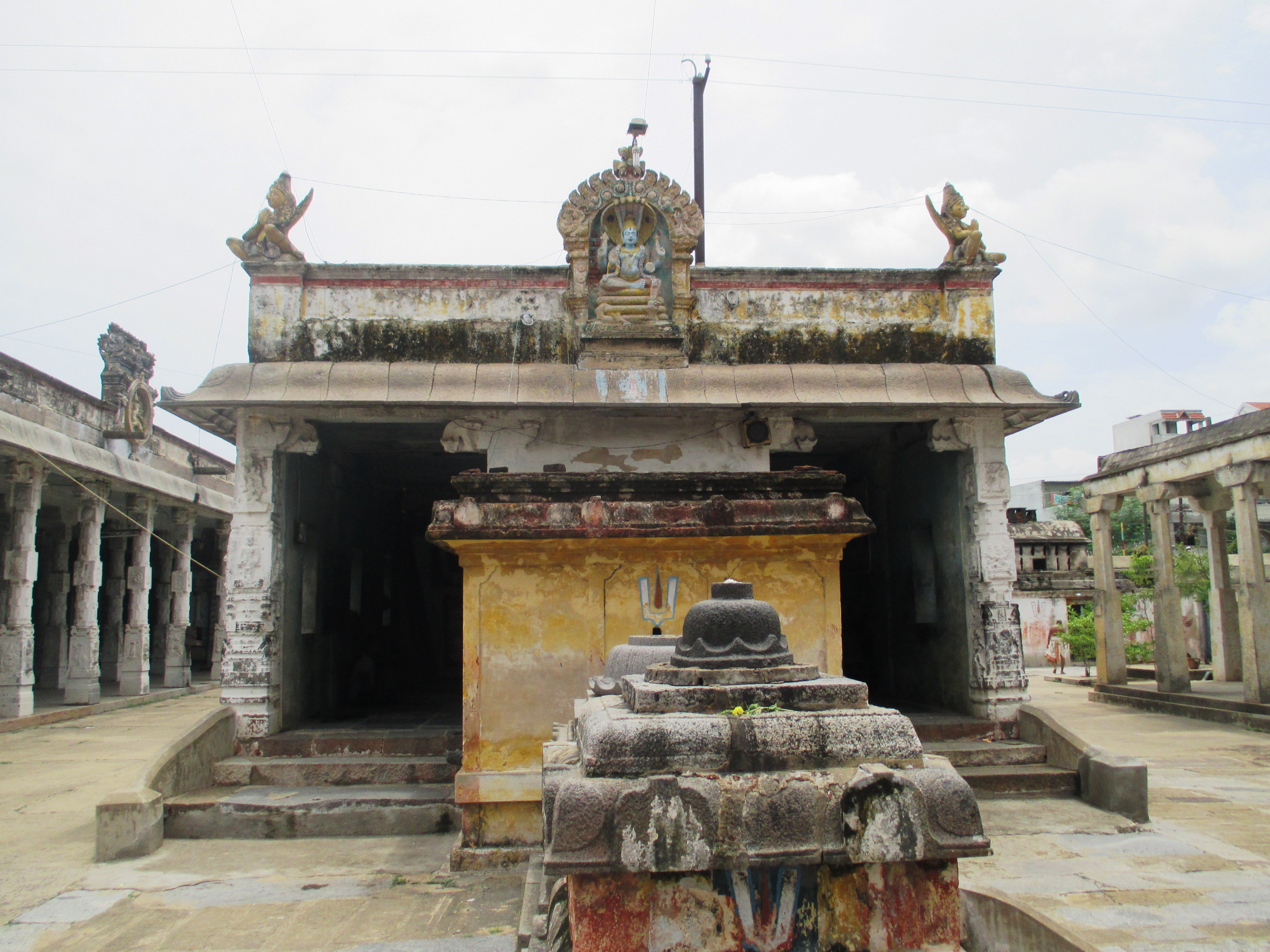
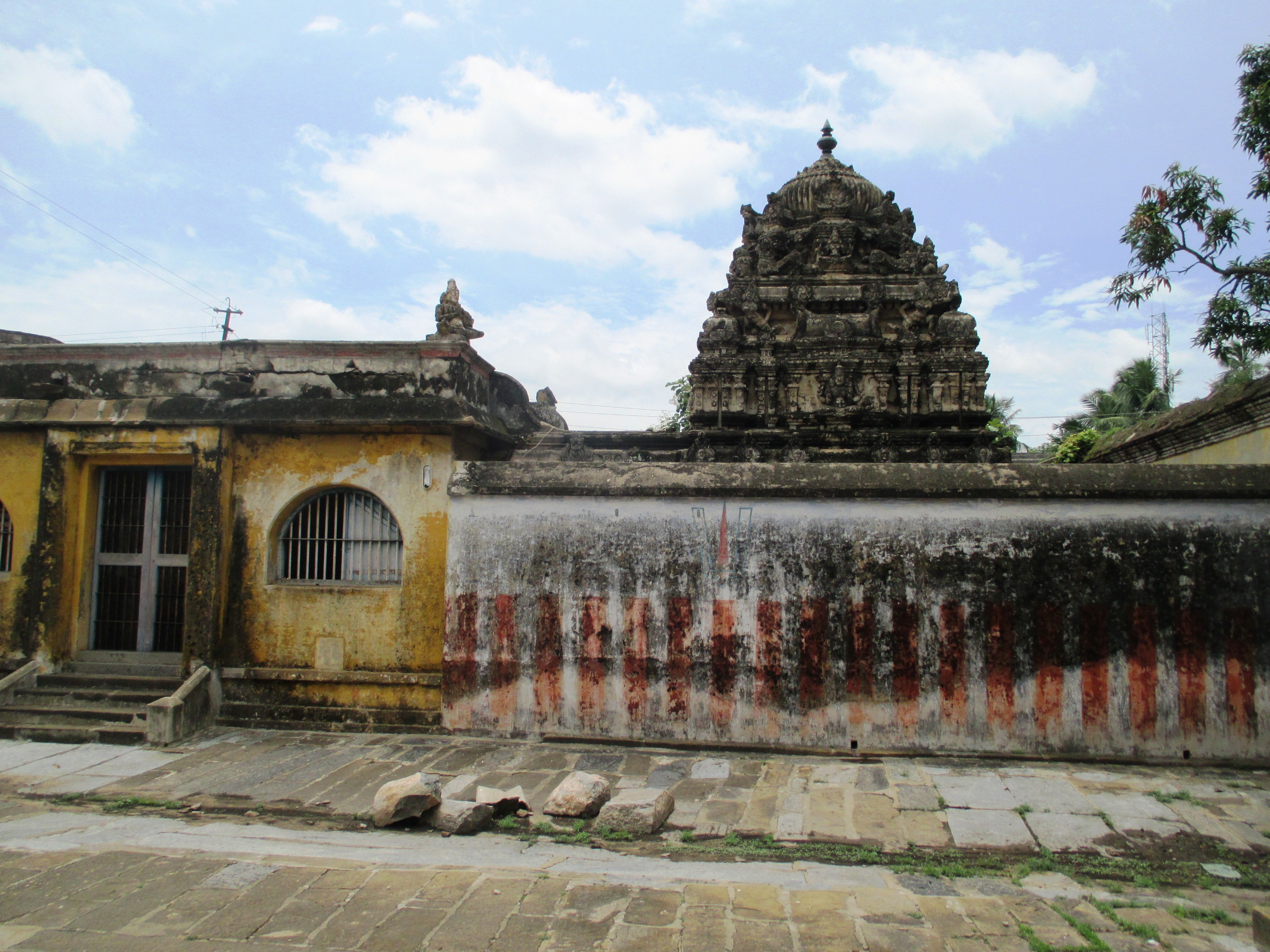
Shrines of the temple

The central shrine of the temple has the image of presiding deity, Pavalavannar in standing posture. The festive image of the presiding deity and that of Santhanagopala Krishnan are located inside the sanctum. The West facing sanctum is approached through the flagstaff, pillared halls, namely Mahamandapam and the Ardhamandapam. The roof of the sanctum is called Vedasara Vimana and it has five kalasams and stucco images of various legend. The temple has separate shrines for Alvars located to the North of the flagstaff. The pillars in the hall are sculpted with images of Nammalvar, Ramanujar, Manavala Mamunigal and various avatars and legends of Vishnu. There are other shrines of Rama along with Sita and Hanuman and Garuda. The vimana of the central shrine is called Vedasara Vimana. The shrine of Pavalavalli, the consort of Pavalavannar, is located facing the central shrine in the Eastern side of the temple. The temple has two precincts with the second precinct enclosed by granite walls pierced by a five tiered rajagopuram (gateway tower). The gopuram is studded with stucco images of various legends, with the notable among them being the representation of Narasimha, an avatar of Vishnu slaying the demon Hiranya. A shrine of Manavala Mamunigal is located to the left of the gopuram from the entrance. The temple tank, Chakra Theertham, is located to the North east direction from the entrance.

== Festivals and religious practices ==
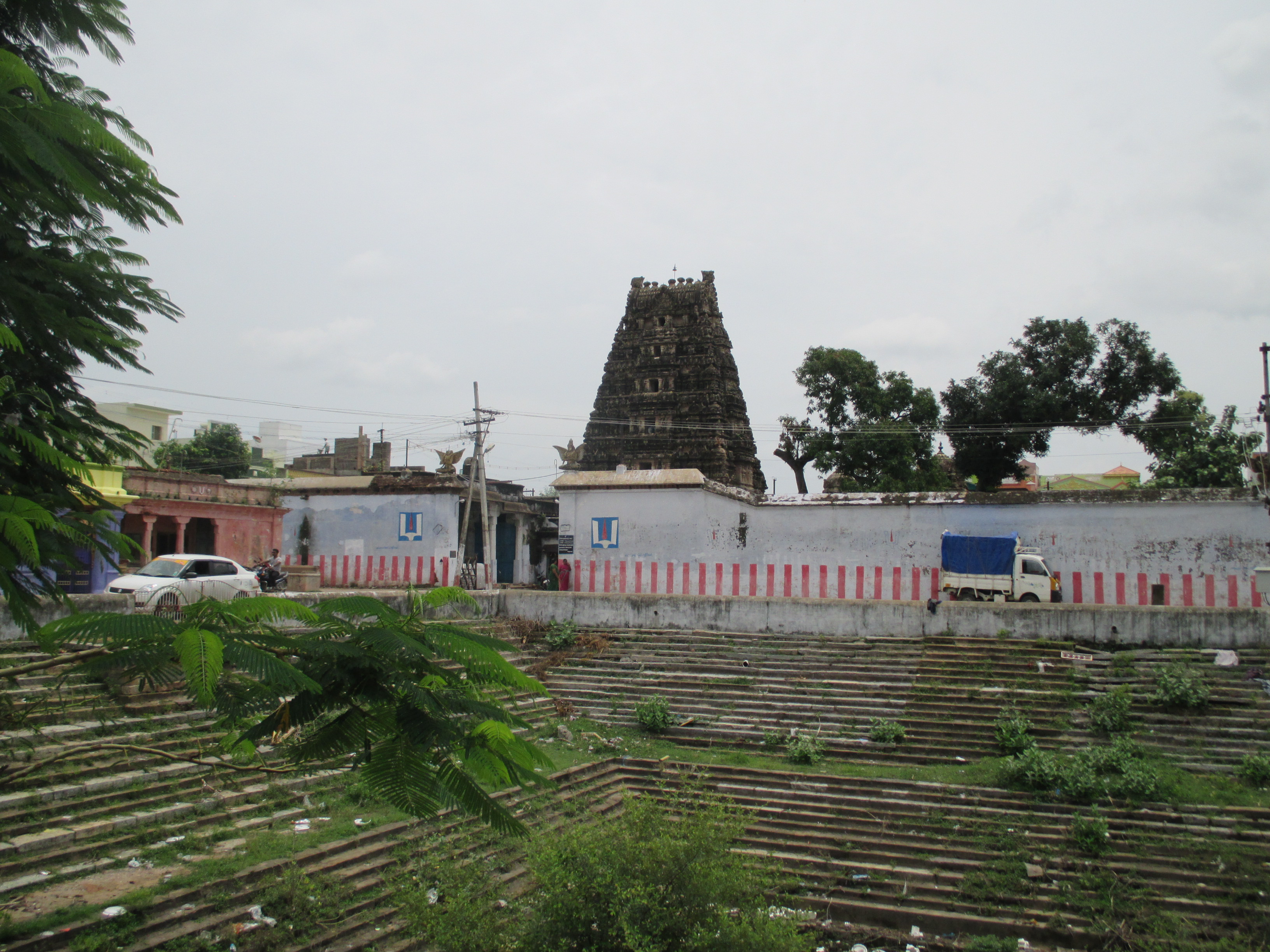
Pavalavannan temple tank

The temple follows the traditions of the Tenkalai sect of Vaishnavite tradition and follows vaikanasa aagama. The temple priests perform the pooja (rituals) during festivals and on a daily basis. As at other Vishnu temples of Tamil Nadu, the priests belong to the Vaishnava community, from the Brahmin class. The temple rituals are performed six times a day: Ushathkalam at 7:00 a.m., Kalasanthi at 8:00 a.m., Uchikalam at 12:00 p.m., Sayarakshai at 6:00 p.m., Irandamkalam at 7:00 p.m. and Ardha Jamam at 10:00 p.m. Each ritual has three steps: alangaram (decoration), neivethanam (food offering) and deepa aradanai (waving of lamps) for both Pavalavannar Perumal and Pavalavalli. During the last step of worship, nadasvaram (pipe instrument) and tavil (percussion instrument) are played, religious instructions in the Vedas (sacred text) are recited by priests, and worshippers prostrate themselves in front of the temple mast. There are weekly, monthly and fortnightly rituals performed in the temple. Brahmotsavam celebrated during the Tamil month of Vaikasi (May - June) is the major festival of the temple. Pavitrotsavam celebrated during the Tamil month of Panguni (March - April) and Vaikuntha Ekadashi during Margali (December - January) are the other festivals celebrated in the temple.
