= Othandeeswarar Temple =

Shiva temple in Tamil Nadu, India

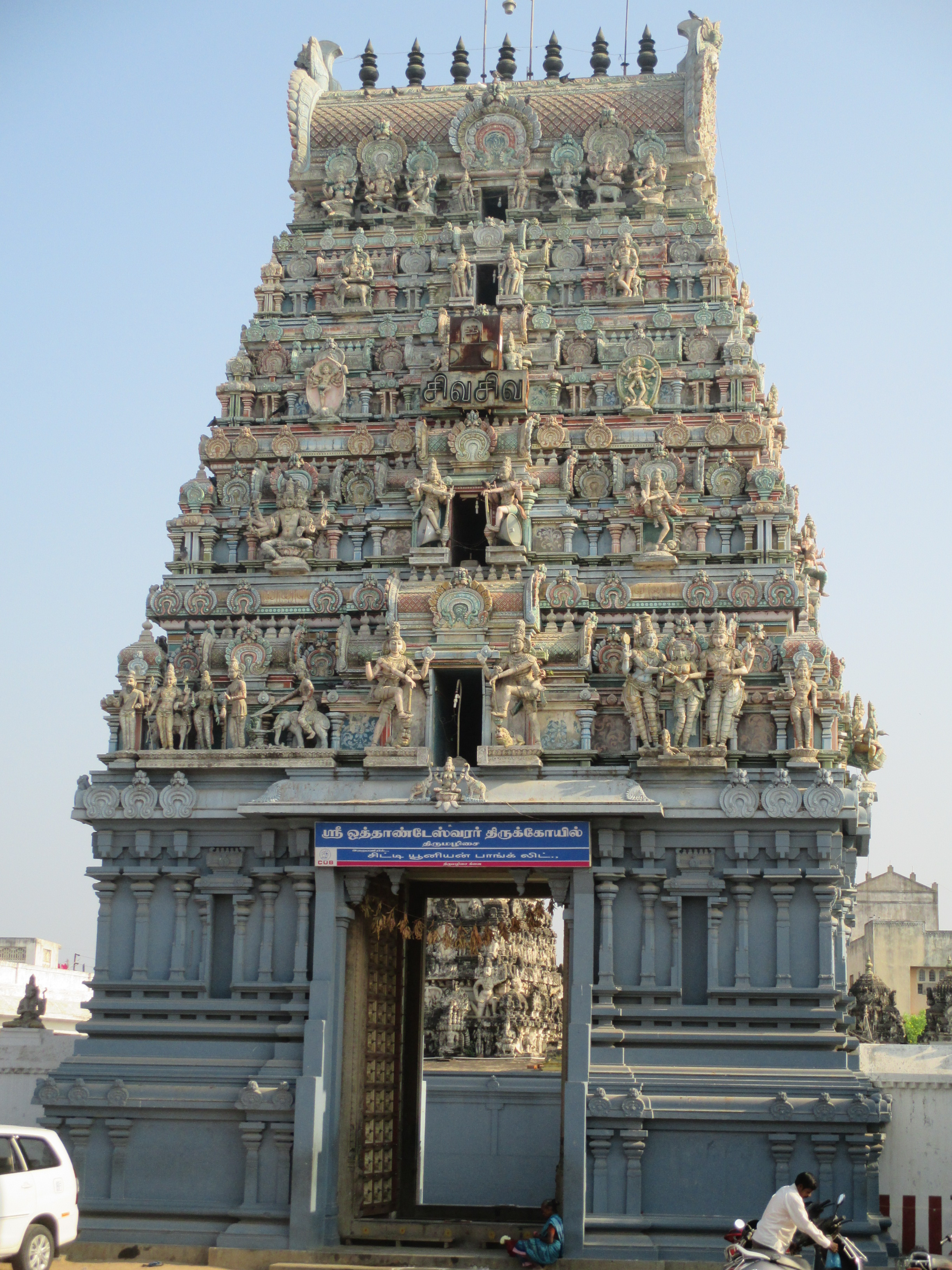

- Location in Tamil Nadu

Religion
- Affiliation: Hinduism
- District: Tiruvallur
- Deity: Othandeeswarar(Shiva) Kulirvithanayaki (Parvathi)

Location
- Location: ChennaiThirumazhisai
- State: Tamil Nadu
- Country: India
- Coordinates: 13°03′18″N 80°03′42″E

Architecture
- Type: Dravidian architecture

Othandeeswarar Temple in Thirumazhisai Chennai City in Tiruvallur district in the South Indian state of Tamil Nadu, is dedicated to the Hindu god Shiva. It is located 22 km from the state capital Chennai. Constructed in the Dravidian style of architecture, the temple was built during the 11th century by Chola king Kulothunga Chola II. Shiva is worshipped as Othandeeswarar and his consort Parvathi as Kulirvithanayaki.

A granite wall surrounds the temple, enclosing all its shrines. The temple has a five-tiered rajagopuram, the gateway tower. The Vijayanagar and Vijayanagar kings made further expansion to the temple during the 16th century.

The temple is open from 6 am - 11:30 am and 4:30 - 8:00 pm on all days. Four daily rituals and many yearly festivals are held at the temple, of which the Brahmotsavamfestival during the Tamil month of Panguni (March - April) and Sani Peyarchi (transit of planet Saturn) being the most prominent. The temple is maintained and administered by the Hindu Religious and Endowments Department of the Government of Tamil Nadu.

== Legend ==
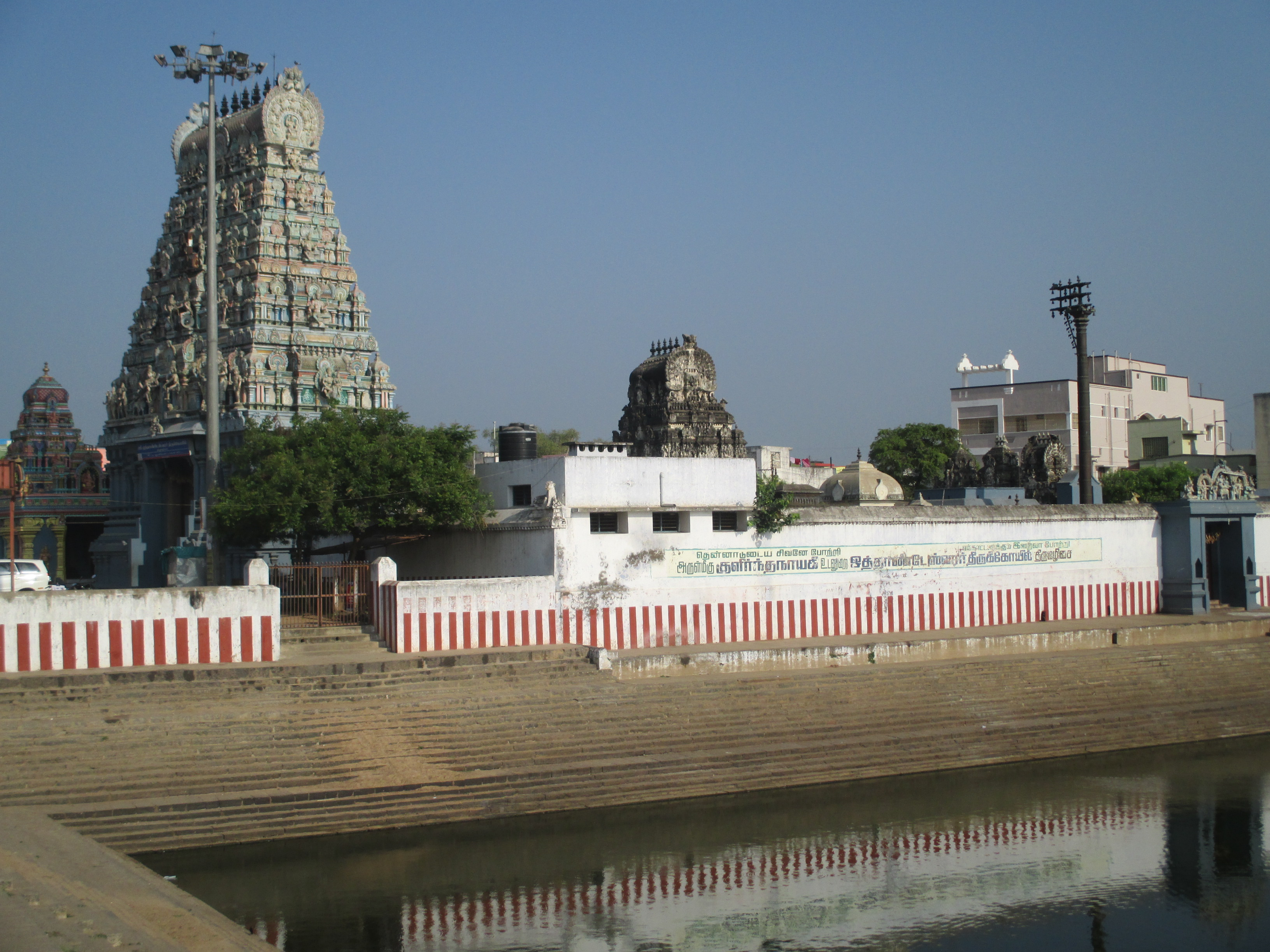
Image of the temple tank and the tower

As per another legend, Chola king Kulothunga Chola II was hunting in the forest and while returning from Thirumullaivasal, found a blockade on his way. He tried to remove it using his sword and found blood stain in it. He later found that it emanated from the image of lingam (an iconic form of Shiva) in the place. The king wanted to expiate his sin of cutting the image and cut his hand. Shiva was pleased with the devotion and appeared to him at this place as Othandeeswarar along with his consort Parvathi as Kulirvithanayaki. Othandeeswarar also restored the hand of Kulothunga Chola and hence got the name Kai Thantha Piran. The presiding deity at the temple is still believed to have a scar on it. As per another legend, since the presiding deity relieves the devotees off their curses and impinges strength the deity is also called Manuanukuleeswarar.

== History ==
The temple has many inscriptions from the Chola period during the 11th century. Kulothunga Chola II is believed to have built the temple and the shrines in the current form. Historians believe that the shrine of Vishnu seems to be a later addition. Sengunda Mudaliyars built many shrines in the temple and refurbished the tank. The Vijayanagara kings, who ruled the region, have done benevolent endowments to the temple. In modern times, the temple is maintained and administered by the Hindu Religious and Endowments Department of the Government of Tamil Nadu.

== Architecture ==
Othandeeswarar temple has a seven-tiered rajagopuram, the gateway tower piercing the rectangular granite walls around the temple. The presiding deity Othandeeswarar, in the form of Lingam is housed in the sanctum. The sanctum is approached from the main entrance through the flag staff hall, Maha mandap and Artha mandap. The flag staff is located in the flagstaff hall axial to the sanctum. An image of Nandi faces the main shrine in the Maha Mandapa. There are shrines of Vinayaka, Muruga before the Mahamandap and the sanctum is guarded by Dwarapalas. The shrine of Kulirvithanayaki is located in the second precinct. The temple has a shrine of Nataraja (dancing form of Shiva) and his consort Sivakami facing each other. The vimana, structure over the sanctum is in the form of Gajabrushta, the shape of an elephant in its sitting posture. Vinayaka in the temple is called Prasanna Vinayaga. There is a shrine for Vishnu in the second precinct. There also shrines of Shani, Vrusabha Nayaka, Durga, Chandikeswara, Dakshninamurthy and Navagraha around the sanctum.

== Festival ==
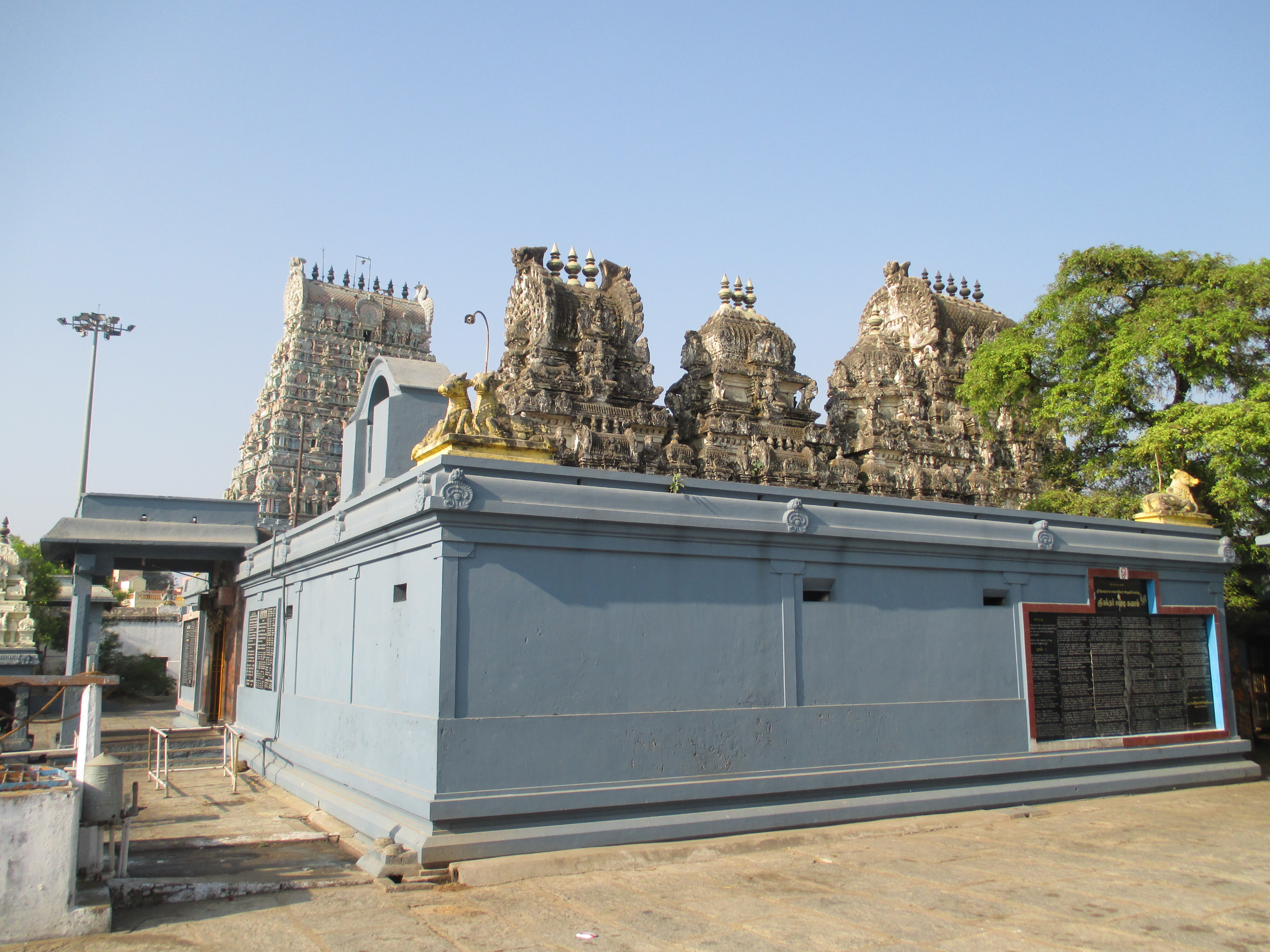
The various shrines of the temple

The temple follows Saivite tradition. The temple priests perform the pooja (rituals) during festivals and on a daily basis. As at other Shiva temples of Tamil Nadu, the priests belong to the Shaivaite community, a Brahmin sub-caste. The temple rituals are performed four times a day: Kalasanthi at 8:30 a.m., Uchikalam at 11:30 p.m., Sayarakshai at 6:00 p.m., and Sayaratchai between 8:00 - 8:00 p.m. Each ritual has three steps: alangaram (decoration), neivethanam (food offering) and deepa aradanai (waving of lamps) for both Othandeeswarar and Kulirvithanayaki. There are weekly, monthly and fortnightly rituals performed in the temple. The temple is open from 6am - 11:30 am and 4-8:30 pm on all days. The temple has many festivals in its calendar, with the Brahmotsavamfestival during the Tamil month of Panguni (March - April) and Sani Peyarchi (transit of planet Saturn) being the most prominent
