= Ulagalantha Perumal Temple, Kanchipuram =

Perumal temple in Kanchipuram district, Tamil Nadu, India

Ulagalantha Perumal Temple
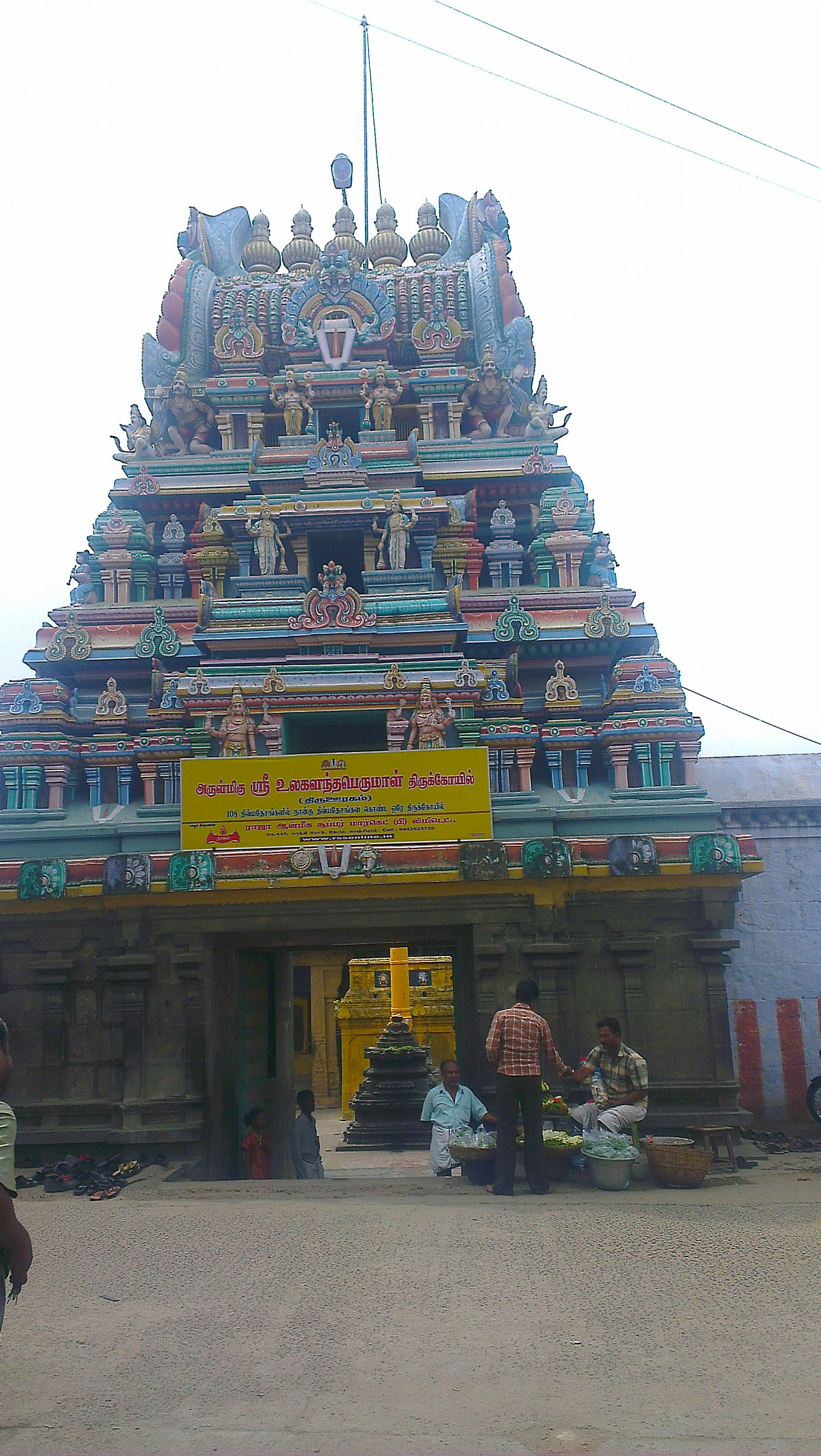

- Location in Tamil Nadu

Religion
- Affiliation: Hinduism
- District: Kanchipuram
- Deity: Trivikraman, Ulagalantha Perumal (Vishnu); Amuthavalli (Lakshmi)
- Features: Tower: Śrīkara Vimanam; Temple tank: Naga Tirtham, Shesha Tirtham

Location
- Location: Kanchipuram
- State: Tamil Nadu
- Country: India
- Coordinates: 12°50′21″N 79°42′18″E

Architecture
- Type: Dravidian architecture
- Direction of façade: West

Ulagalandha Perumal Temple is a temple dedicated to Vishnu located in Kanchipuram, Tamil Nadu, India. Constructed in the Dravidian style of architecture, the temple is glorified in the Naalayira Divya Prabandham, the early medieval Tamil canon of the Alvar saints from the 6th through 9th centuries CE. It is one of the 108 Divya Desams dedicated to Vishnu, who is worshipped as Ulagalantha Perumal, and his consort Lakshmi as Amuthavalli. The temple is believed to have been built by the Pallavas, with later contributions from the medieval Cholas, Vijayanagara kings, and Madurai Nayaks.

The temple is found in Big Kanchipuram, and situated close to Kamakshi Amman Temple. The temple complex actually houses four Divya Desams in its different precincts, namely, Tirukkaravanam, Tirukarakam, Tiruneerakam, and Tiruürakam, that last of which is present within the sanctum sanctorum of the main temple.

Vamana, the Brahmin dwarf, and one of the ten avatars of Vishnu, is held to have appeared here to quell the pride of the asura king Mahabali. As Ulagalantha Perumal, he is believed to have appeared before king Mahabali and later to the Alvars. The temple is maintained and administered by the Hindu Religious and Endowment Board of the Government of Tamil Nadu.

== Legend ==
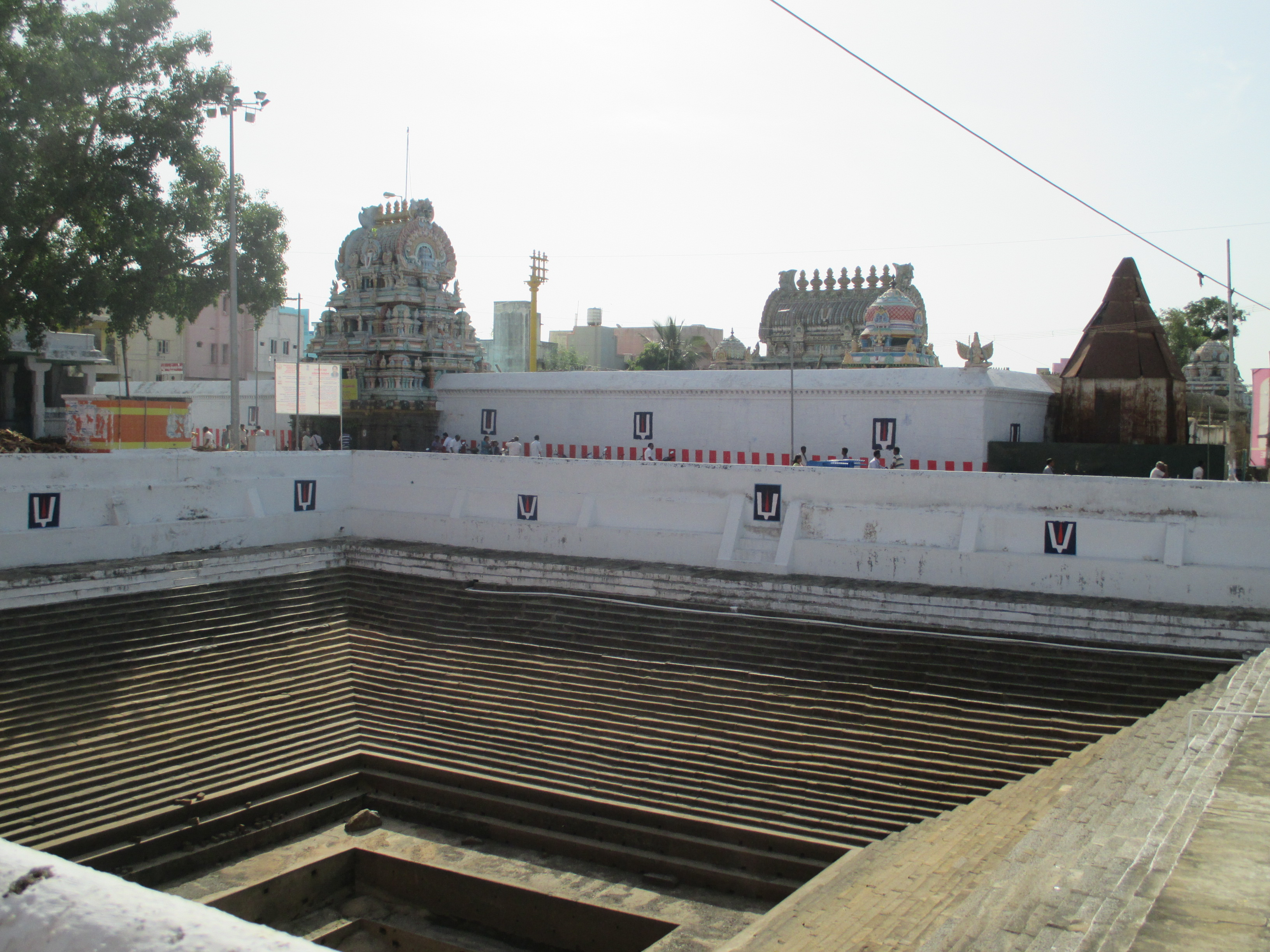
A view of the temple from the street preceding it and the temple tank

The Bhagavata Purana describes that Vishnu descended as the Vamana avatar to restore the authority of Indra over Svarga, as it had been taken by Mahabali, a benevolent asura King. Bali was the grandson of Prahlada. King Mahabali was generous, and engaged in severe austerities, winning the praise of the world. With the praise from his courtiers and others, he regarded himself as the most powerful being in the world. Vamana, in the guise of a short Brahmin carrying a wooden umbrella, went to the king to request three paces of land. Mahabali consented, against the warning of his guru, Shukracharya. Vamana then revealed his identity, and enlarged to gigantic proportions to stride over the three worlds. He stepped from heaven to earth with the first step, from earth to the netherworld with the second. With all the dominions he held effectively under Vamana's strides. King Mahabali, unable to fulfill his promise, offered his head for the third. Vamana then placed his foot upon the humbled monarch, banishing him to the netherworld. Some texts also report that Vamana did not step into the netherworld, and instead gave its rule to Mahabali.

In his giant form, Vamana is known as Trivikrama. The legend is associated with the Thrikkakara Temple in Kerala and also with this temple and Ulagalantha Perumal Temple, Tirukoyilur.

== History and inscriptions ==
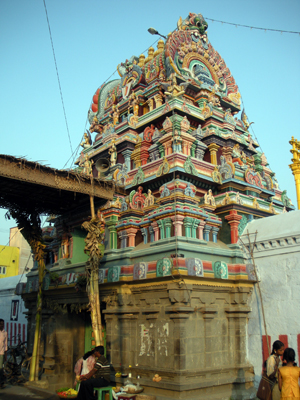
View of the gopuram

According to the historian Nagaswamy, based on the inscriptions and the location of the temple, it is the oldest temple in Kanchipuram. The earliest inscription is from 846 CE during the regime of Nandivarman III (846–869 CE). There is another account that the temple is developed further by Rajendra Chola I (1012–1044 CE).

The inscriptions refer the main deity by various names like Thiru Uragathu Ninru-arulina Paramaswamin, Tiru Uragathaḻvar and Tiru Uragathu Emberuman. The Sambuvarayar rule of the 16th century records the gift of a pond and a grove in Sevvanmedu village. The temple still continues to possess this grove. The inscriptions in the temple also indicate increased trade and commerce during the Pallava period, with licenses provided to shops like oil, ghee, arecanut, vegetables, flowers, coconut, sugar, cloth and sandal. The temple has not received a single donation from the ruling Vijayanagara Empire, though the nearby temples received generous donations, indicating that the temple had sources of income. From those days Pancharatra Agama was followed in the temple, though all the surrounding people followed Vaikhanasa and Pancharatra Agama.

Parimelalhagar, the 13th-century Tirukkural commentator, belonged to the lineage of priests of the Ulagalantha Perumal temple.

== Architecture ==
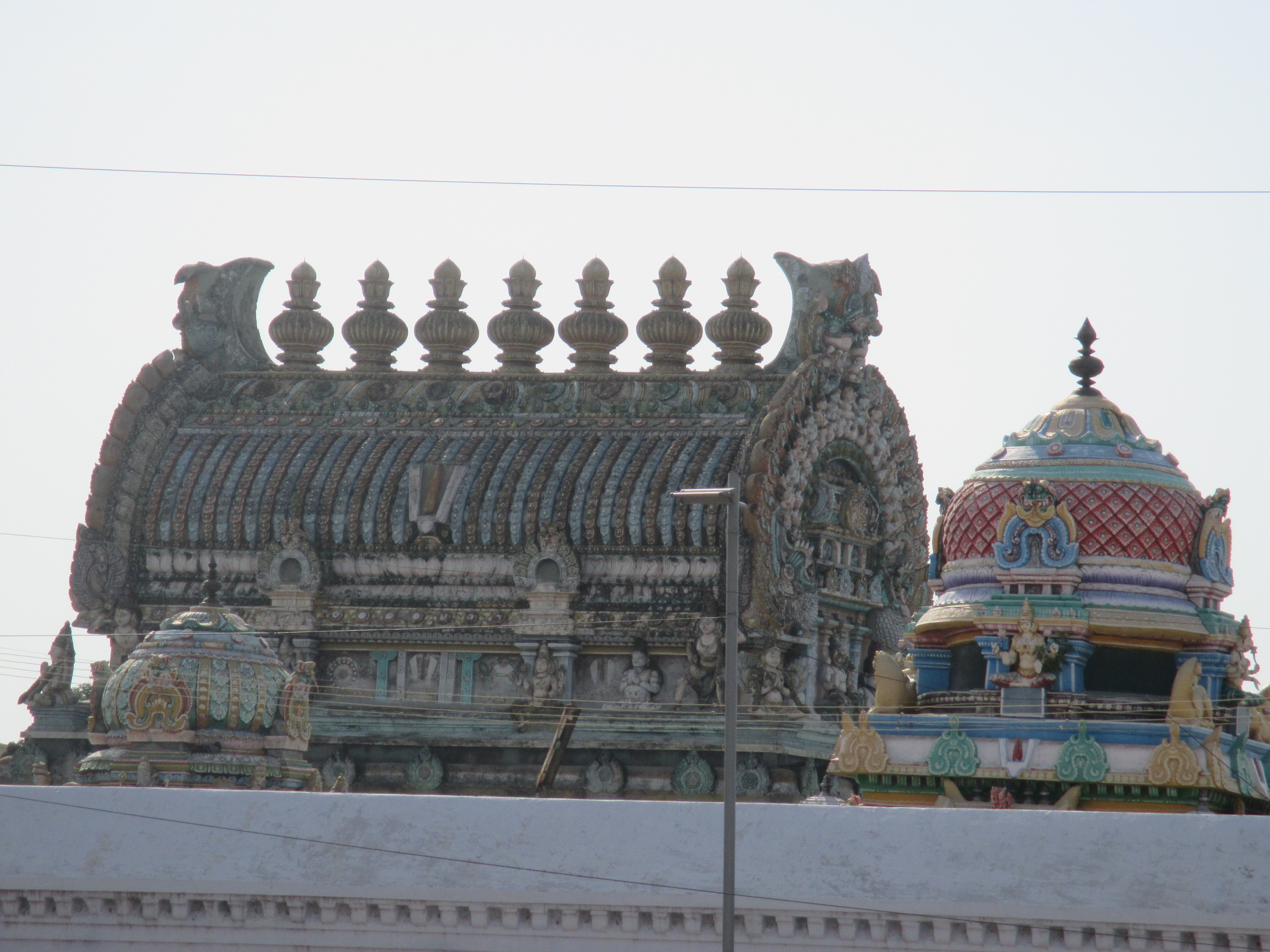
View of the ceiling of the temple

The temple has an area of about 60,000 square feet (5,600 m^{2}) and has a three tiered rajagopuram (main towers) with seven kalasas. The temple houses four Divya Desams on its own – they are Tirukkaravanam, Tirukarakam, Tiruürakam, and Tiruneerakam.

=== Tiruoorakam ===
The central shrine of temple is most commonly referred as Peragam, while the smaller shrine where the image of the snake god Adishesha is houses is called Tiruoorakam. As per tradition, Mahabali at the foot of Vamana, could not view the deity's vishvarupam, and requested him to manifest as a smaller form. Vishnu obliged, and appeared as a snake in a smaller shrine. The shrine is frequented by childless couple praying for offspring.

=== Tirukkarakam ===
The shrine is located on the third precinct of the temple. As per Hindu legend, sage Garga performed his penance at this temple and obtained knowledge. The place thus derived its name Garagaham, which later became Karakam. The presiding deity of the shrine is Karunakara Perumal facing north and seated on Adishesha and his consort Padmamani Nachiyar. The temple tank associated with it is called Agraya Tirtham, and the vimana is called Vamana Vimanam or Ramaya Vimanam.

=== Tirukkaravanam ===
The shrine is located in the second precinct. The presiding deity is called Kalvar and faces north, while his consort is Kamalvalli Thayar. Gauri Tatakam and Taratara Tatakam are the temple tanks associated with the temple and the vimana is called Puskala Vimana.

=== Tiruneerakam ===
The temple has no presiding deity, but just a festive image probably brought from other shrine. The images of the festival deity, Jagadishvara, facing the east and having four arms, is housed in a hall in the second precinct. The water body associated with the temple is Akrura Tirtham and the vimana is Jagadishvara Vimanam. According to Pillai Perumal Aiyangar in his Nurrettrutiruppatiyantati, Vishnu revealed himself to a sage in the form of a child as a banyan leaf.

== Religious significance ==
The temple is revered in Naalayira Divya Prabandham, the 7th–9th century Vaishnava canon, by Thirumangai Alvar in one hymn of Thirunedunthandagam. The temple is classified as a Divya Desam, one of the 108 Vishnu temples that are mentioned in the book. The temple is unique among Divya Desams as it is the only temple complex that houses four different Divya Desams.
