= Mutal Tiruvantati =

Tamil Hindu work of literature

- ← Tirunetuntantakam Irantam Tiruvantati →
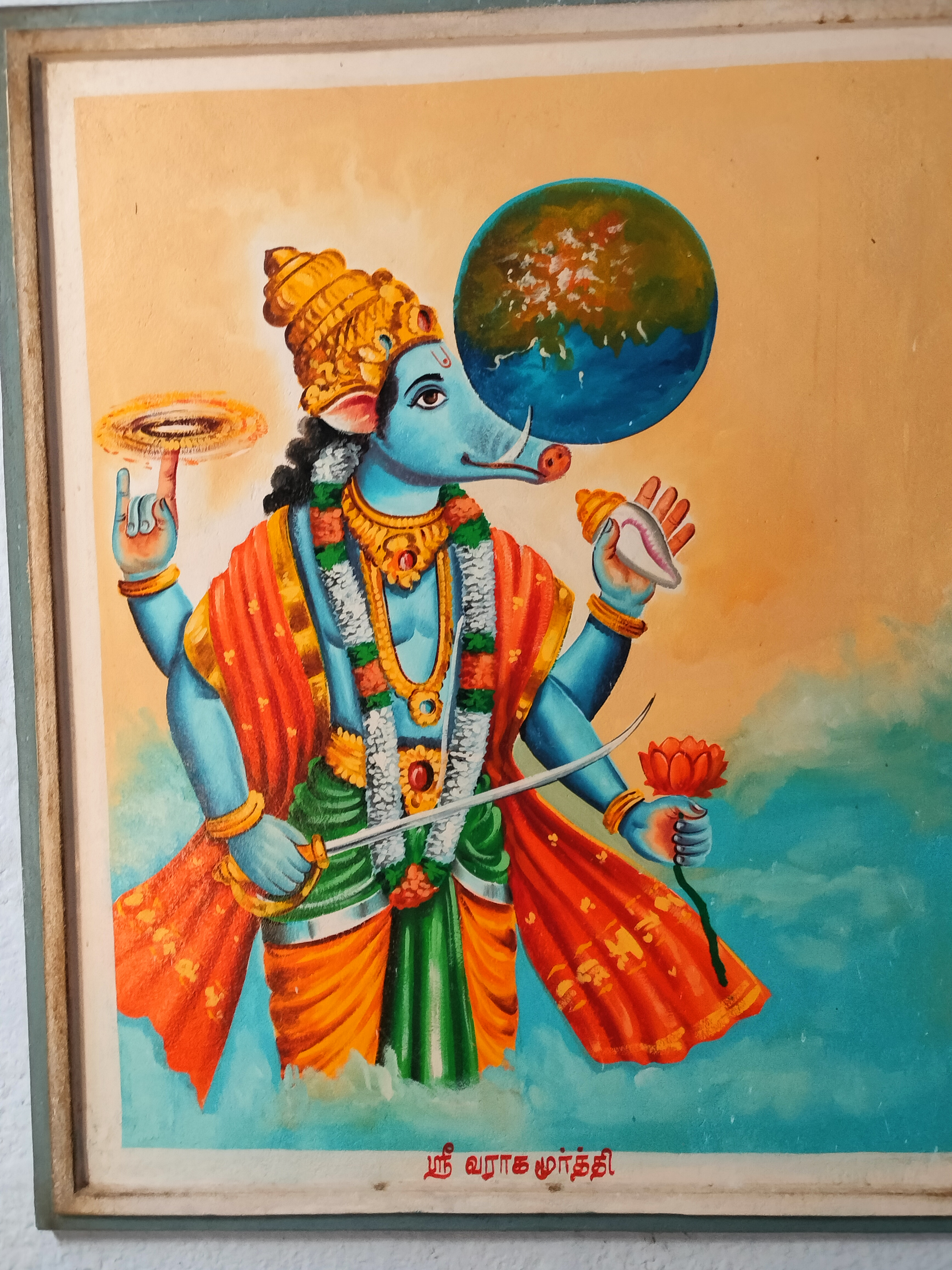
- Painting of Varaha. Sri Appan Venkatachalapati Temple, Cheranmahadevi.

Information
- Religion: Hinduism
- Author: Poigai Alvar
- Language: Tamil
- Period: 9th–10th century CE
- Verses: 100

The Mutal Tiruvantati (Tamil: முதல் திருவந்தாதி, romanized: Muṭal Tiruvanṭāṭī, lit. 'First sacred hymns') is a Tamil Hindu work of literature composed by Poigai Alvar, one of the twelve Alvars of Sri Vaishnavism. Comprising 100 verses in the poetic meter called the antati, it is part of the compendium of hymns called the Nalayira Divya Prabandham.

== Legend ==
According to Sri Vaishnava legend, Poigai Alvar once travelled to offer his veneration to Vishnu at the Ulagalantha Perumal temple at Tirukoilur. He met other two Alvars, Pey, and Bhutath, whom he did not know, but who had also chosen to coincidentally visit the temple during the same period. During an ensuing rainstorm, Poigai found some accommodation at a mandapam, and was asked by Pey if he could share some space in his room. Observing that there was a single bed present in the mandapam, Poigai remarked that it would be most convenient for an individual to lie down upon the bed, but two to be seated. During this very moment, Bhutath arrived, and expressed the desire to share the mandapam with the other two poet-saints. The trio decided that it would be most proper for an individual to lie down, two people to be seated, but the fact that there were three of them meant that it would be most suitable for all of them to stand. Thus, three poet-saints stood all night, and during the dawn, they felt the presence of a fourth entity in their midst. The force collided against them, and overwhelmed them so much that each of them composed hymns regarding their experience, in the form of an antati. The entity is proclaimed to be Perumal. The Mutal Tiruvantati is stated to be the hymns composed by Poigai Alvar, using the sunlight as his lamp.

== Hymns ==
The first hymn of the Mutal Tiruvantati elucidates his state of mind when Perumal overwhelmed him with his presence:

With the earth as the lamp,
the sweeping oceans as melted butter,
and the sun with the fiery rays
as the flame;
I have woven a garland of words
for the feet of the Lord,
who bears the red flaming wheel,
so I can cross the ocean of grief.

— Mutal Tiruvantati, Hymn 1

Poigai Alvar also references the Vamana and the Varaha incarnations of Vishnu in this work:

O Lord of discus! Taking a huge form you stretched your lotus feet and measured the Earth, even as the world feared and the celestials trembled. When you came as a huge boar and lifted the Earth on your tusk teeth, how did it not fall off, resting as it was on one tooth alone?

— Mutal Tiruvantati, Hymn 9

== See also ==
- Irantam Tiruvantati
- Munram Tiruvantati
- Nanmukan Tiruvantati
