= Irantam Tiruvantati =

Tamil Hindu work of literature

- ← Mutal Tiruvantati Munram Tiruvantati →
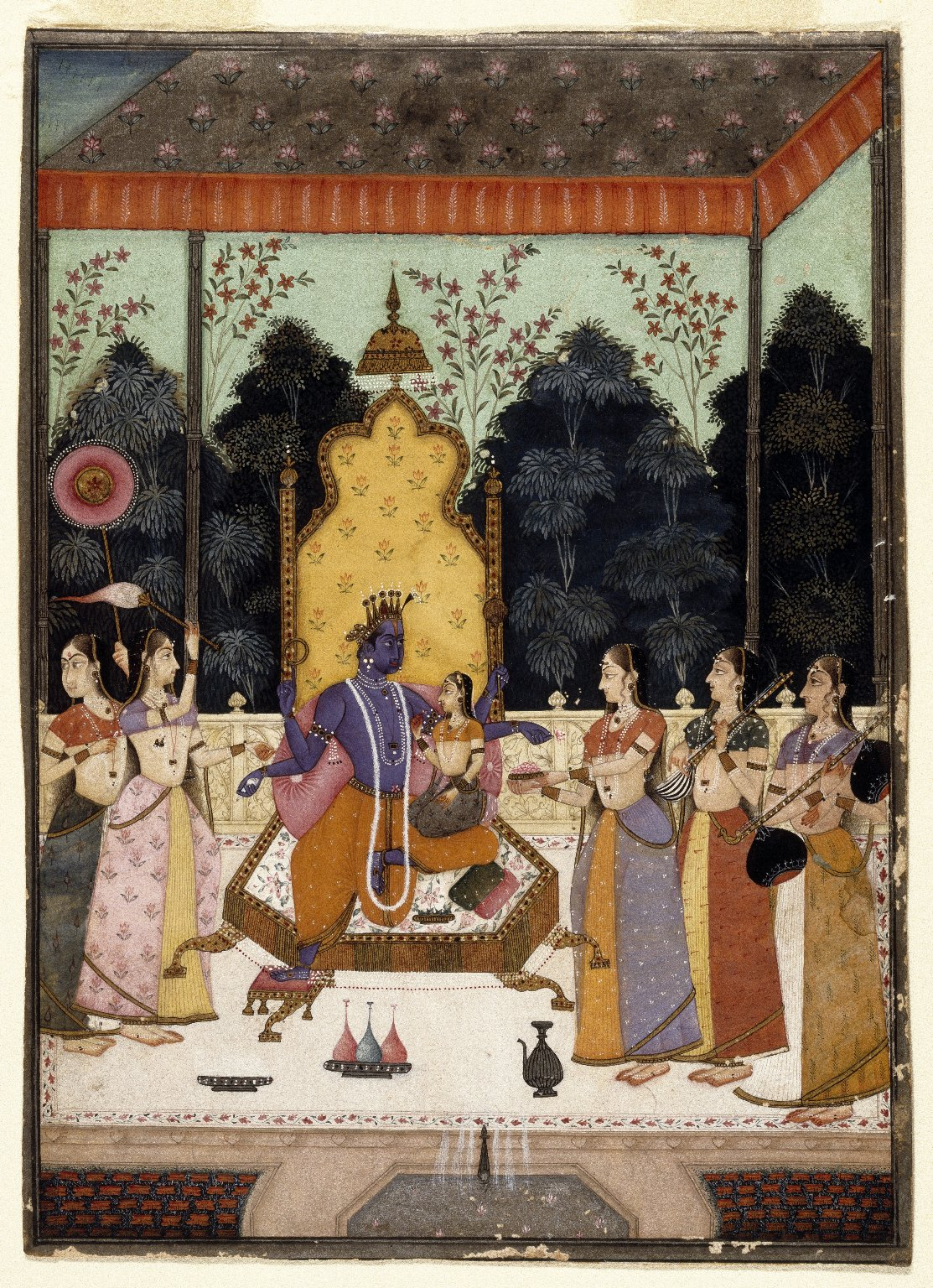
- A Vision of Vishnu (Vaikuntha Darshana). circa 1710 and circa 1715, Brooklyn Museum.

Information
- Religion: Hinduism
- Author: Bhutath Alvar
- Language: Tamil
- Period: 9th–10th century CE
- Verses: 100

The Irantam Tiruvantati (Tamil: இரண்டாம் திருவந்தாதி, romanized: Iraṇțam Tiruvanṭāṭī, lit. 'Second and sacred hymn') is a Tamil Hindu work of literature composed by Bhutath Alvar, one of the twelve Alvars of Sri Vaishnavism. Comprising 100 verses in the poetic meter called the antati, it is part of the compendium of hymns called the Nalayira Divya Prabandham. It is dedicated to the preserver deity, Vishnu.

== Legend ==
According to Sri Vaishnava legend, Poigai Alvar once travelled to offer his veneration to Vishnu at the Ulagalantha Perumal temple at Tirukoilur. He met other two Alvars, Pey, and Bhutath, whom he did not know, but who had also chosen to coincidentally visit the temple during the same period. During an ensuing rainstorm, Poigai found some accommodation at a mandapam, and was asked by Pey if he could share some space in his room. Observing that there was a single bed present in the mandapam, Poigai remarked that it would be most convenient for an individual to lie down upon the bed, but two to be seated. During this very moment, Bhutath arrived, and expressed the desire to share the mandapam with the other two poet-saints. The trio decided that it would be most proper for an individual to lie down, two people to be seated, but the fact that there were three of them meant that it would be most suitable for all of them to stand. Thus, the three poet-saints stood all night, and during the dawn, they felt the presence of a fourth entity in their midst. The force collided against them, and overwhelmed them so much that each of them composed hymns regarding their experience, in the form of an antati. The entity is proclaimed to be Perumal. The Irantam Tiruvantati is stated to be the hymns composed by Bhutath Alvar, using his love for the deity as his lamp.

== Hymns ==
The first hymn of the Irantam Tiruvantati describes the poet-saint's thoughts when Perumal overwhelmed him with his presence:

With love as the lamp,
passion as the ghee,
a mind melting with joy
as the wick,
with my soul dissolving
I lit the blazing flame of wisdom
for Narayana.
I, who desire the wisdom of Tamil.

— Irantam Tiruvantati, Hymn 1

The author also references Vishnu and Lakshmi residing in their celestial abode, Vaikuntha, in this work:

The lord of gods in heaven is light-effulgent. Those who worship his ocean- reclining form, strewing fresh flowers at his feet will be counted as devotees, worthy of entering his fabled celestial city.

In that city, under a canopy of pearls, gems and diamonds, and strings of fresh flowers, the lord is seated with the lotus-dame Lakshmi, borne on his right. I worship his feet.

— Irantam Tirumatal, Hymns 3-4

== See also ==
- Mutal Tiruvantati
- Munram Tiruvantati
- Nanmukan Tiruvantati
