= Munram Tiruvantati =

Tamil Hindu work of literature

- ← Irantam Tiruvantati Nanmukan Tiruvantati →
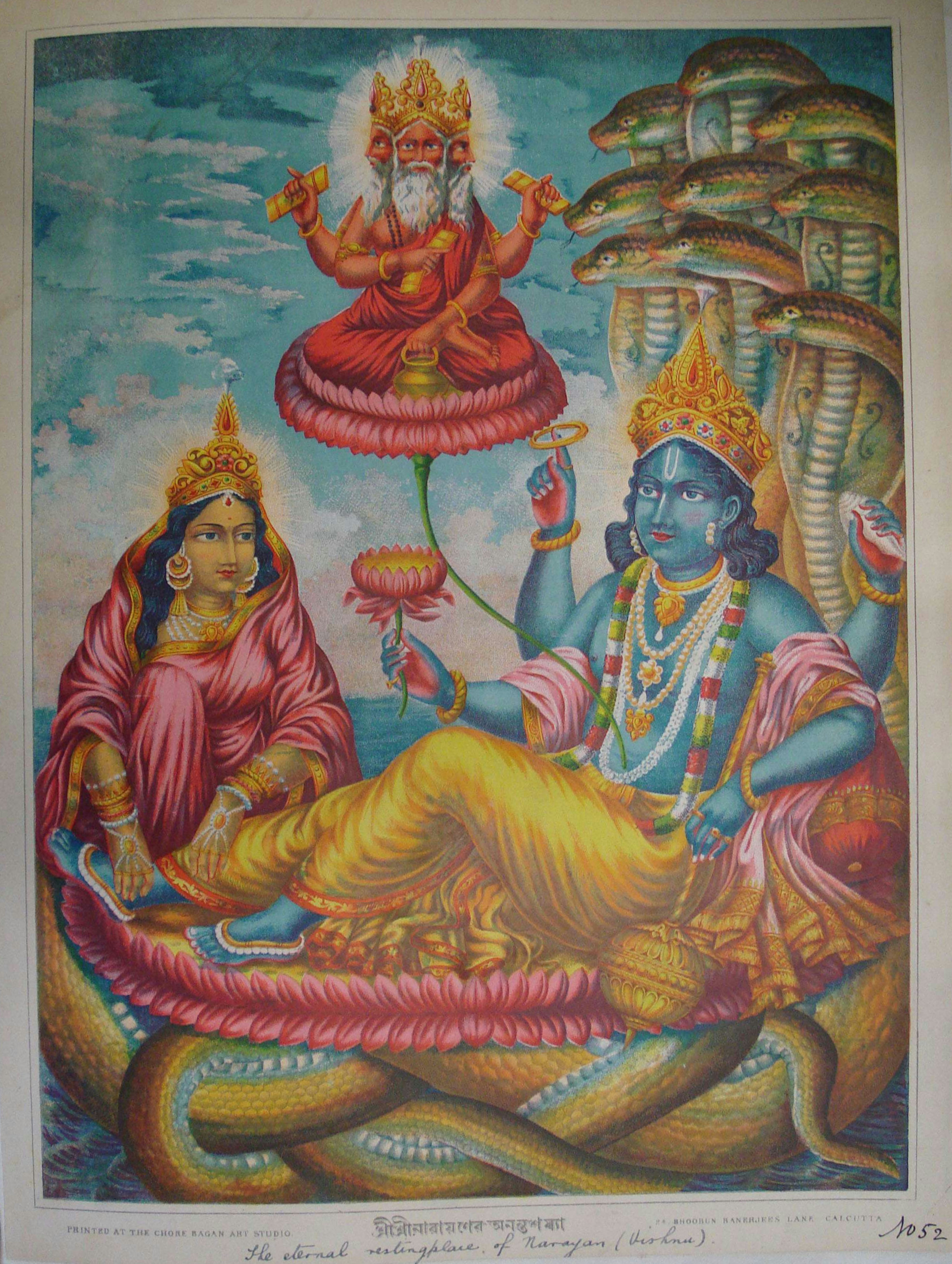
- Lithograph of Vishnu and Lakshmi at Vaikuntha, British Museum.

Information
- Religion: Hinduism
- Author: Peyalvar
- Language: Tamil
- Period: 9th–10th century CE
- Verses: 100

The Munram Tiruvantati (Tamil: மூன்றாம் திருவந்தாதி, romanized: Mūnṛām Tiruvanṭāṭī, lit. 'third sacred hymn') is a Tamil Hindu work of literature composed by Peyalvar, one of the twelve Alvars of Sri Vaishnavism. Comprising 100 verses, it is written in the poetic meter called the antati. It is part of the compendium of hymns called the Nalayira Divya Prabandham. It is dedicated to the preserver deity, Vishnu.

== Legend ==
According to Sri Vaishnava legend, Poigai Alvar once travelled to offer his veneration to Vishnu at the Ulagalantha Perumal temple at Tirukoilur. He met other two Alvars, Pey, and Bhutath, whom he did not know, but who had also chosen to coincidentally visit the temple during the same period. During an ensuing rainstorm, Poigai found some accommodation at a mandapam, and was asked by Pey if he could share some space in his room. Observing that there was a single bed present in the mandapam, Poigai remarked that it would be most convenient for an individual to lie down upon the bed, but two to be seated. During this very moment, Bhutath arrived, and expressed the desire to share the mandapam with the other two poet-saints. The trio decided that it would be most proper for an individual to lie down, two people to be seated, but the fact that there were three of them meant that it would be most suitable for all of them to stand. Thus, the three poet-saints stood all night, and during the dawn, they felt the presence of a fourth entity in their midst. The force collided against them, and overwhelmed them so much that each of them composed hymns regarding their experience, in the form of an antati. The entity is proclaimed to be Perumal. The Munram Tiruvantati is stated to be the hymns composed by Peyalvar, where he describes his divine vision of his deity.

== Hymns ==
The first hymn of the Munram Tiruvantati describes the poet-saint's thoughts when he witnessed a vision of Vishnu and Lakshmi:

The vision rose before me first,
now at this very instant,
of the divine mother with my ocean-like Lord.
Then I saw his brilliant form radiant like the sun,
with his sparkling discus deadly in battle in one hand,
and the curved conch in the other.

— Munram Tiruvantati, Hymn 1

The author also references Krishna's deeds during his childhood and adulthood in this work:

Can the world understand this wonder? The lord who reclines in the ocean-deep came as a wonder child and killed an ogress. He conducted the great Bharata war and destroyed mighty kings. And yet he cringed in fear when his mother threatened him with a churning rod for stealing butter!

— Munram Tirumatal, Hymn 28

== See also ==
- Mutal Tiruvantati
- Irantam Tiruvantati
- Nanmukan Tiruvantati
