= Thirukkadigai =

Vishnu Temple in Ranipet

Thirukadigai
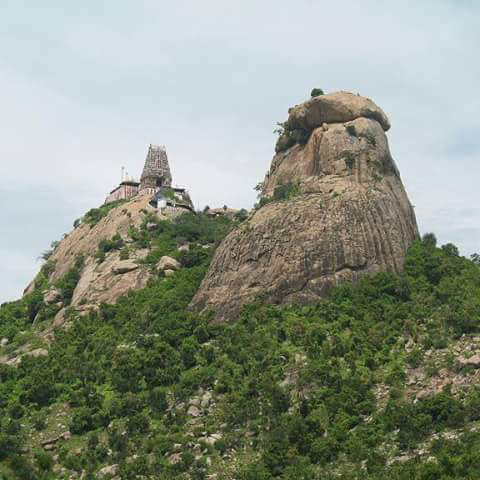

- Location in Tamil Nadu

Religion
- Affiliation: Hinduism
- District: Ranipet
- Deity: Bhaktavatsala Perumal, Narasimhar
- Festivals: Vaikuntha Ekadashi, Krishna Janmashtami, Purattasi Saturdays

Location
- Location: Ghatikachala, Sholinghur
- State: Tamil Nadu
- Country: India
- Coordinates: 13.0885°N 79.4184°E

Architecture
- Type: Dravidian architecture
- Temple: One

Thirukkadigai or Sholingapuram is a temple in Sholinghur, a village in Ranipet district of the South Indian state of Tamil Nadu, dedicated to the Hindu god Vishnu. Constructed in the Dravidian style of architecture, the temple is mentioned in the Naalayira Divya Prabandham, the early medieval Tamil canon of the Alvar saints from the 6th–9th centuries CE. It is one of the 108 Divya Desams dedicated to Vishnu, who is worshipped as Lakshmi Narasimhar, and his consort Lakshmi as Thirumamagal. There are three separate shrines in the form of Narasimha, Bhaktavatsala Perumal and Hanuman (Anjaneya). They are situated on the larger hill, at the base of the larger hill and on the smaller hill, respectively.

A granite wall surrounds the temple, enclosing all its shrines uphill. The temple has a five-tiered rajagopuram at the top of hill, while the temple tank is located opposite the temple, outside the main entrance in the foothills. The temple follows Tenkalai tradition of worship. Six daily rituals and many yearly festivals are held at the temple, of which the Karthikai festival during November - December, Brahmotsavam during the Tamil month of Chittirai (March - April), and Narasimha Jayanti during Vaikasi (May - June) being the most prominent. The temple is maintained and administered by the Hindu Religious and Charitable Endowments Department of the Government of Tamil Nadu.

== History ==
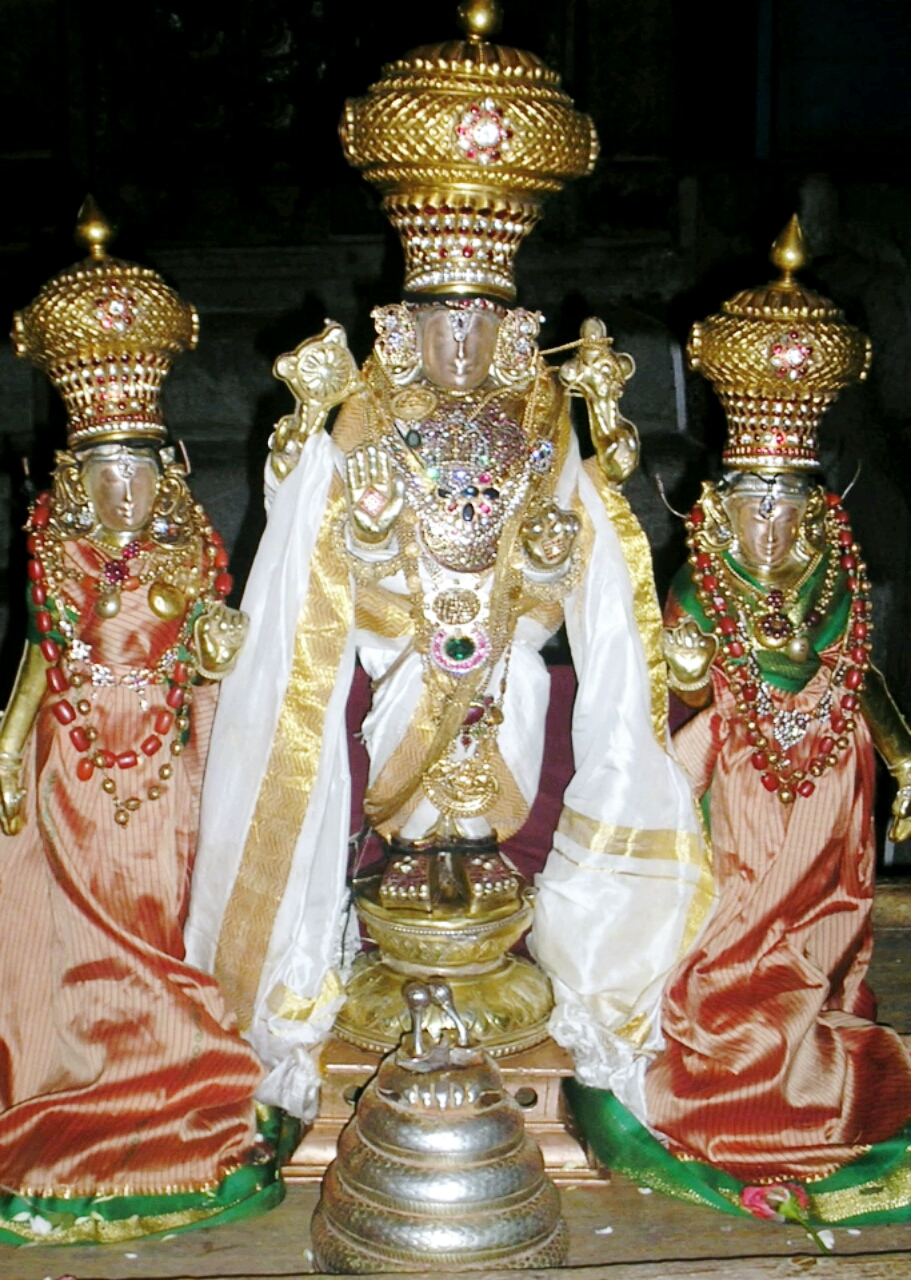
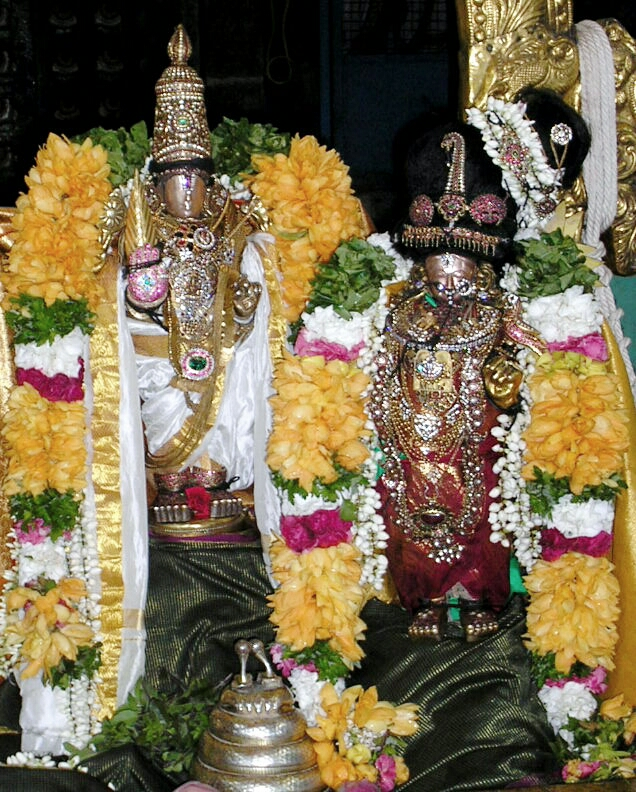
Festival images of the deity

The place was originally called as Cholasimhapuram, which later became Sholinghar. Various scriptures quote the place as Kadigachalam or Thirukadigai as the place is believed to offer blessings to devotees with a worship lasting a Kadigai (24 minutes). Peyalvar refers the presiding deity as "Vaan Poonkadigai Ilankumaran", while based on legend the presiding deity is also called Bhakotchita Swami. Vishnu Purana and Padma Purana refer this place as Kadigai and since Vishwamitra got his Brahmarishi title here, it became Simhapuram. The temple has many inscriptions at the foothills and also on the top of the hill. They indicate generous contributions from Kulothunga Chola III Mayuravarman and Seeyagangan. Manavala Mamunigal is believed to have performed enunciation of Thirupavai at this place at the request of his disciple Erumbiappa. The town originally was under the control of Shaivites which is substantiated by the temple ruins near Parappan Kulam, in the valley between two hills. This is where original Sholinghur was situated. Unfinished Nandhis and Sthupas are found in numerous places in Sholinghur. The temple is seen as one of the famous temples of Narasimha and a powerful image of Hanuman.

Sholingur was the scene of the battle between the British and Hyder Ali during July 1781, in which the British won.

The temple is maintained and administered by the Hindu Religious and Charitable Endowments Department of the Government of Tamil Nadu.

== Architecture ==
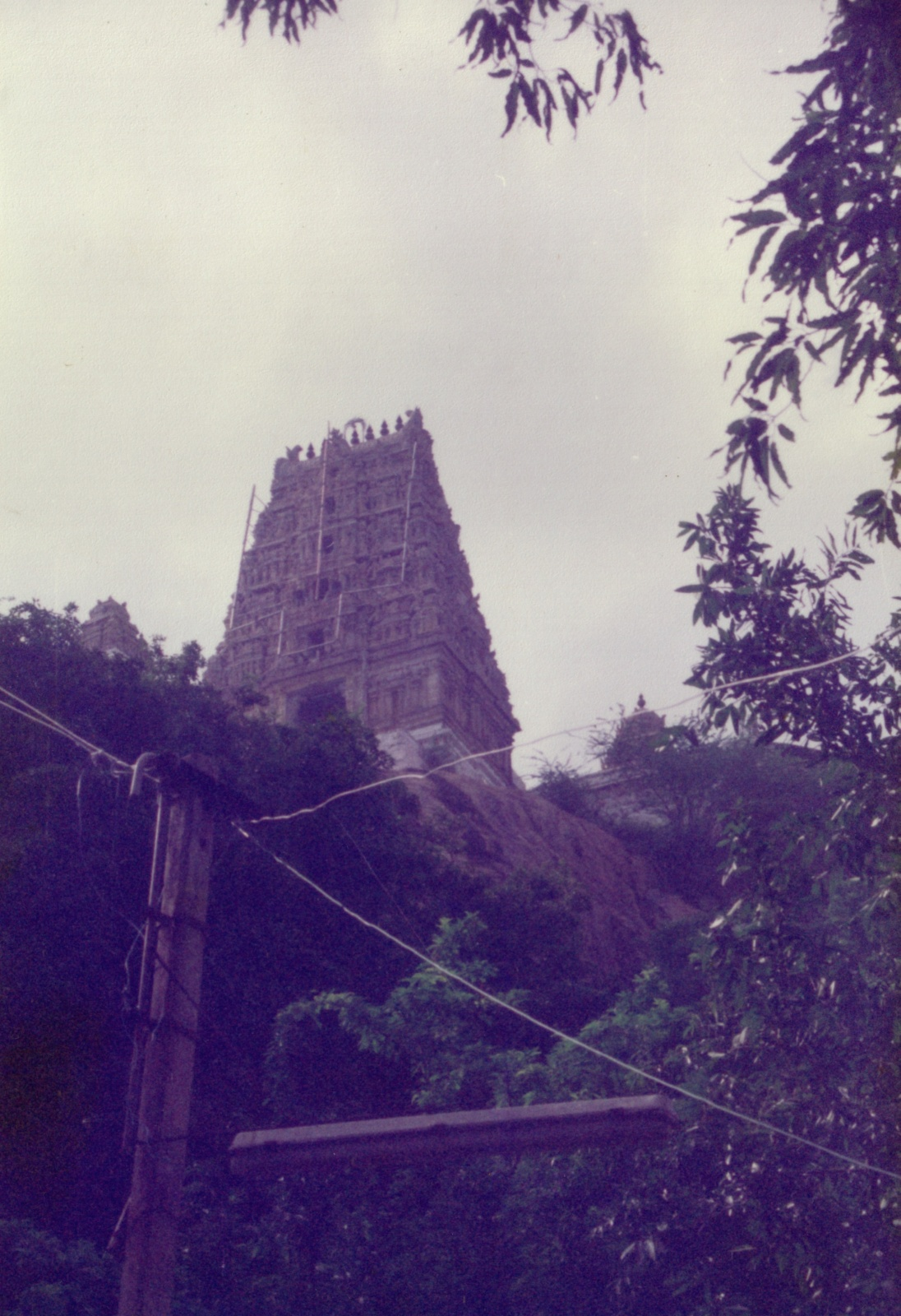
The image of the Gopuram

The temple has twin hills, with the one of Yoga Narasimha called the Periya malai (big hill) 750 ft (230 m) tall and occupying an area of 1.25 acres (5,100 m^{2}). The top of the hill is approached through a flight of 1,305 steps. The temple at the top measures 200 ft (61 m) by 150 ft (46 m) and has a five-tiered gateway tower, the rajagopuram. Narasimha sits in a Yogic posture in a shrine facing East and is called Yoga Narasimha Swamy. The vimana, the tapering roof over the sanctum is called Hemakoti Viamanam. There is a separate shrine for his consort Amrithavalli Thayaar. Yoga Anjenayar Swamy temple of Hanuman (Anjaneya) is present in the second hill called Chinna malai (small hill) 350 ft (110 m) tall. Yoga Anjenayar is sported with chathurpujam (four hands) with a conch and discus in the upper hands and a Jeba malai and Jeba Shankaram in other two respectively. The image of the festival deity, Varadaraja, is housed in the lower shrine of the big hill. The lower shrine has images of Bhaktavatchala Perumal and Sudavalli Thayar. There is a four pillared hall midway to the top of the hill housing the images of Doddacharya and Sudarshana. The temple tanks is called Brahmatheertham as Brahma is believed to have performed penance at this place to propitiate himself from the sins of one of his five heads getting cut by Shiva. In modern times, devotees perform rites at the temple tank seeking blessing from their forefathers. The consecration of the temple was performed during September 2010 at a cost of ₹25 crore and the foundation for rope car facility was also inaugurated.

== Religious importance ==
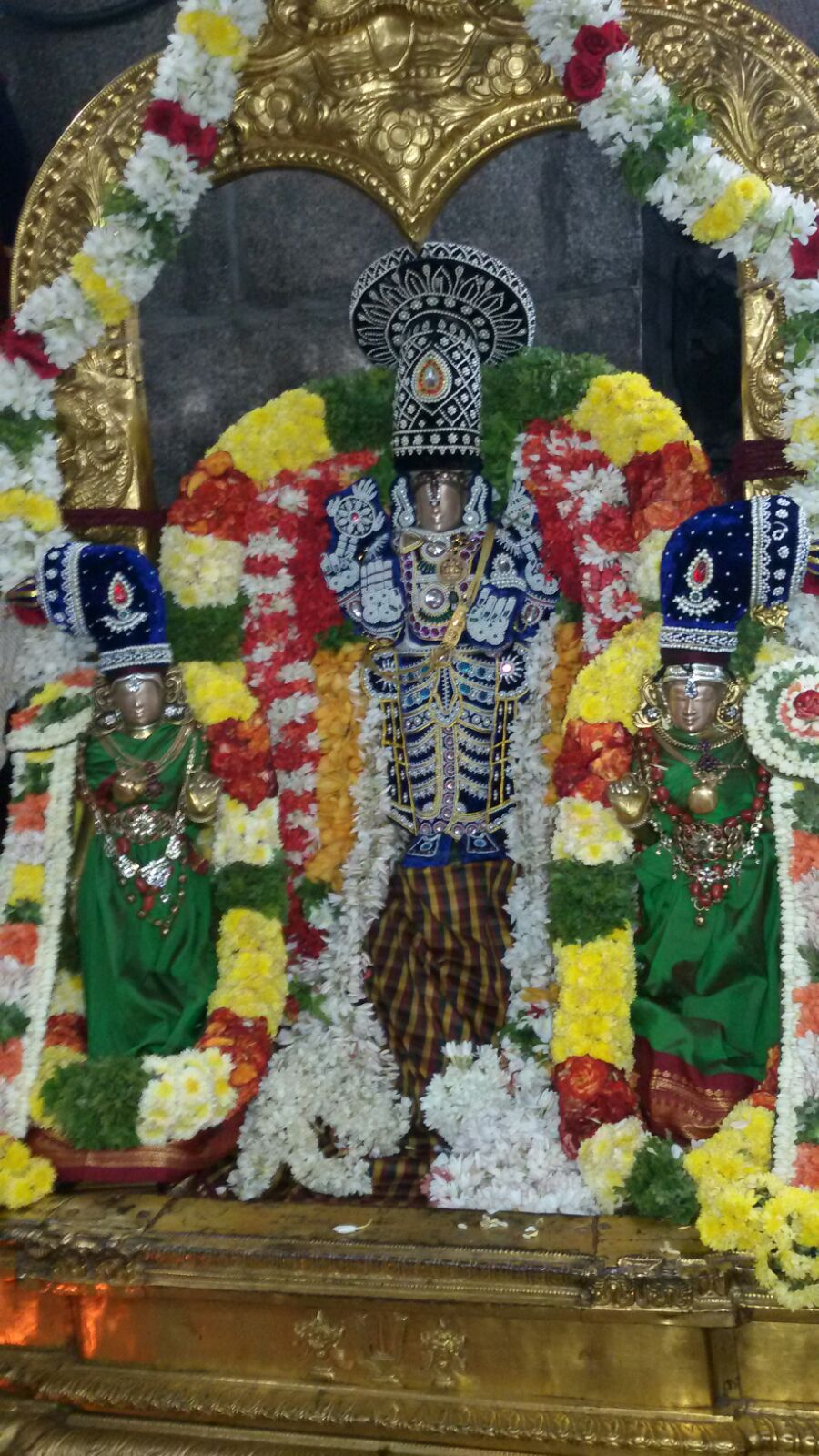
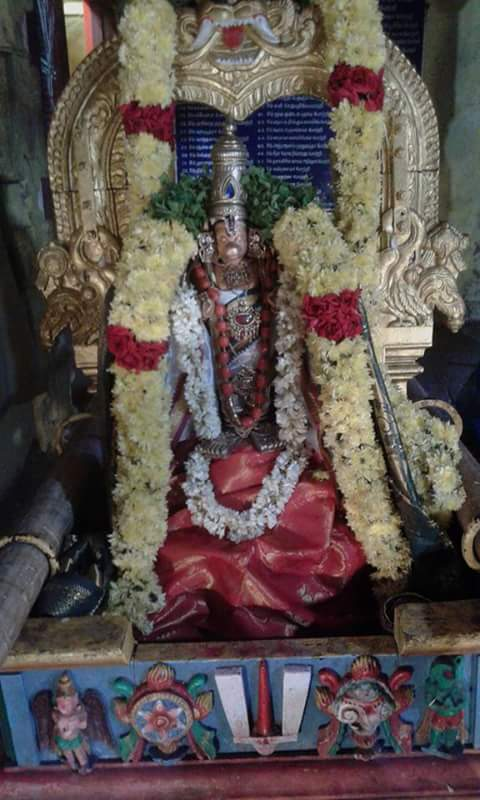
Festival images of the deity and that of Hanuman

Thirukkadigai is revered in Naalayira Divya Prabhandam, the 7th–9th century Vaishnava canon, by Peyalvar and Thirumangai Alvar. The temple is classified as a Divya Desam, one of the 108 Vishnu temples that are mentioned in the book. Peyalvar describes the place as the one having gardens thronged by a swam by bees. The temple also finds mention in later works by Nathamuni, Thirukachi Nambi, Ramanuja, and Manavala Mamunigal. The temple is believed to be one of the 74 seats established by Ramanuja to spread Vishishtadvaita. During the 18th and 19th centuries, the temple finds mention in several works like 108 Tirupathi Anthathi by Divya Kavi Pillai Perumal Aiyangar. Doddacharya was a Vaishnava saint believed to be the descendant of Mudaliandan. Doddacharya followed the steps of Ramanuja in advocating Vishishadvaita and maintained the temples hailed by the Alvars. He is believed to have performed lot of miracles and impressed by his work, Achyuta Deva Raya (1529-42 CE), the relative of Krishnadevaraya gave him benovelent donations for maintenance of temples. During festival occasion in the temple like Brahmostavam, Doddacharya is given a special place in processions and also during the Garuda Sevai in Kanchipuram temple. A festival named Doddacharya Utsavam is celebrated during the Tamil month of Masi (February - March). His descendants are believed to administer the religious activities during modern times. The temple is frequented by people with mental illness, who are believed to get cured by the grace of the presiding deity.

The temple is maintained by the Hindu Religious and Endowment Board of the Government of Tamil Nadu.
