= Nanmukan Tiruvantati =

Tamil Hindu religious text

- ← Munram Tiruvantati Tiruviruttam →
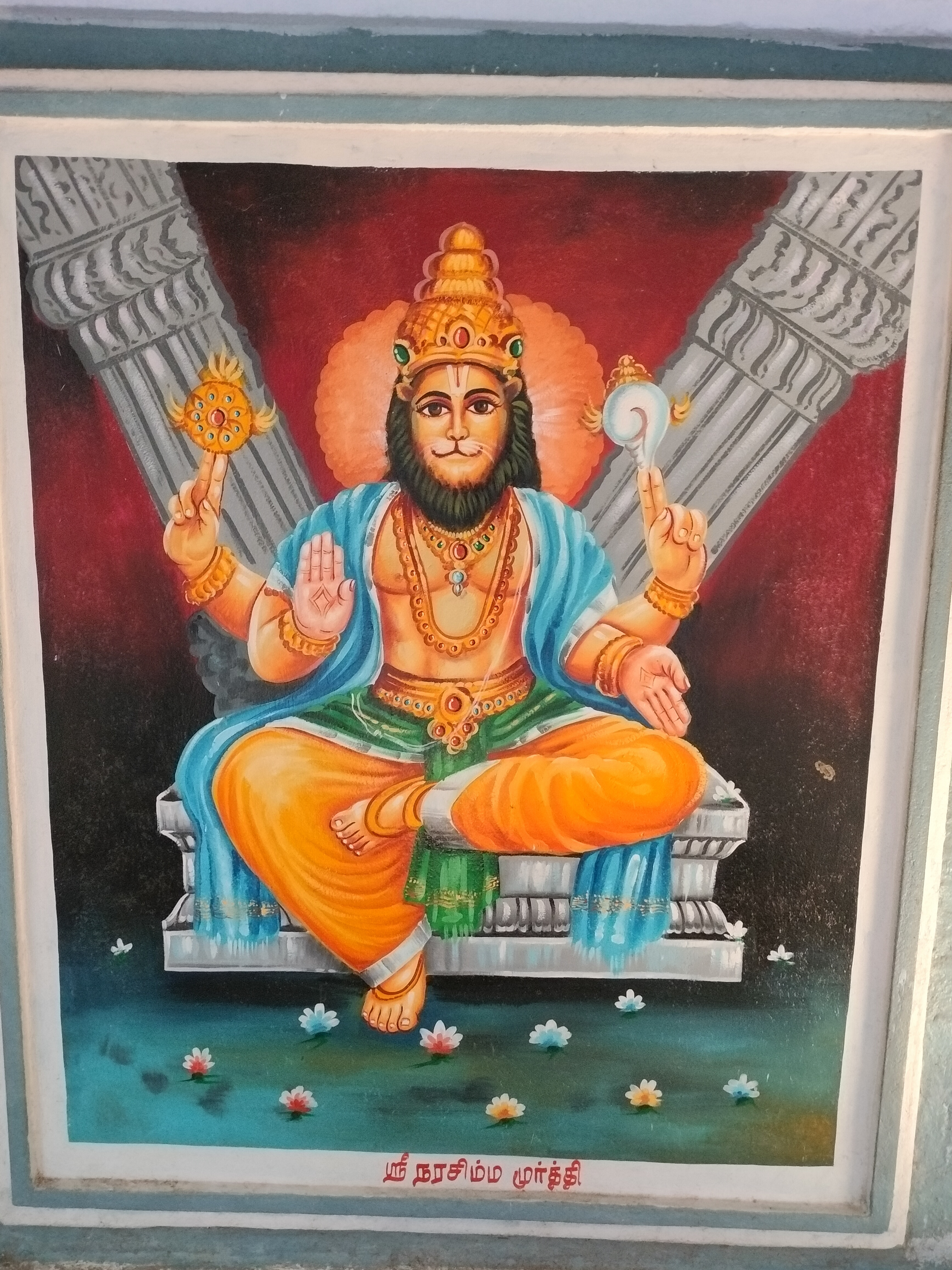
- Painting of Narasimha. Sri Appan Venkatachalapati Temple, Cheranmahadevi.

Information
- Religion: Hinduism
- Author: Tirumalisai Alvar
- Language: Tamil
- Period: 9th–10th century CE
- Verses: 100

The Nanmukan Tiruvantati (Tamil: நான்முகன் திருவந்தாதி, romanized: Nāṇmukan Tiruvanṭāṭī, lit. 'The sacred hymn of the four-faced one') is a Tamil Hindu work of literature composed by Tirumalisai Alvar, one of the twelve Alvars of Sri Vaishnavism. Comprising 100 verses in the form of a poetic device known as the antati, it is part of the compendium of hymns called the Nalayira Divya Prabandham. It is dedicated to the preserver deity, Vishnu.

Scholars have posited that the primary purpose of the Nanmukan Tiruvantati was to establish the supremacy of Narayana (Vishnu) over Nanmukan (Brahma) and Shankaran (Shiva).

== Hymns ==
The first hymn of the Nanmukan Tiruvantati describes the poet-saint's assertion of Vishnu's supremacy:

Narayana created the four-faced one (Brahma), and the four-faced one created Shankaran (Shiva) in his own image.

They say the Ultimate Reality is one. He is Vishnu. Nobody knows the glories of the Lord.

— Nanmukan Tiruvantati, Hymn 1

The author also references Vishnu's incarnation of Narasimha and his slaying of Hiranyakashipu in this work:

O Lord who destroyed the boon-intoxicated Hiranya's mighty chest with curved nails and strong arms! You destroy everything, then you create everything, and become the four Yugas as well, I know it!

— Nanmukan Tiruvantati, Hymn 5

== See also ==
- Mutal Tiruvantati
- Irantam Tiruvantati
- Munram Tiruvantati
