= Bhoothath Alvar =

Poet-saint of Tamil Hindu tradition

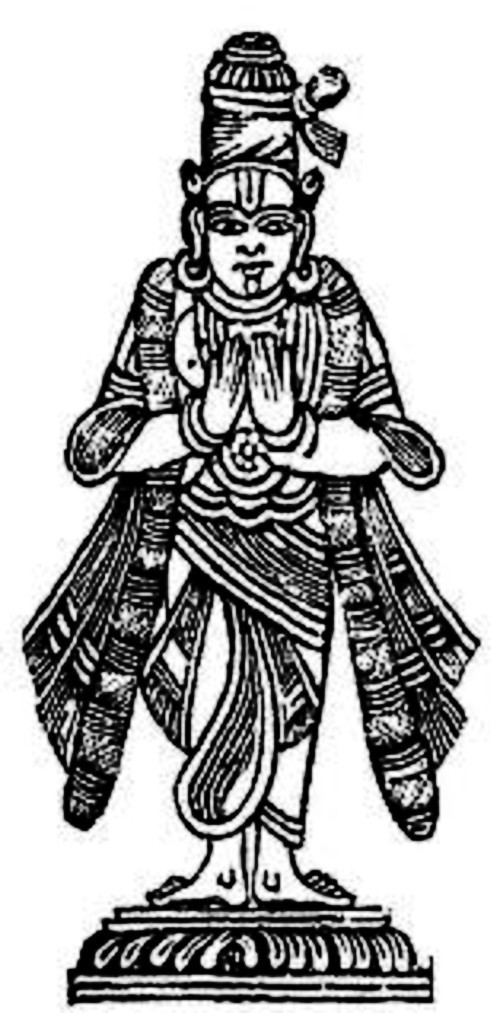

Personal life
- Born: 4203 BCE Thirukadalmallai
- Notable work: Irantam Tiruvantati
- Honors: Alvar saint

Religious life
- Religion: Hinduism
- Philosophy: Vaishnava Bhakti

Bhoothath Alvar (Tamil: பூதத்தாழ்வார், romanized: Bhūtathāḻvār) is one of the twelve Alvar saints of South India, who were known for their affiliation to the Vaishnava tradition of Hinduism. The verses of Alvars are compiled as Nalayira Divya Prabandham and the 108 temples revered are classified as Divya Desams. Bhoothath is considered second in the list of the three principal Alvars, with the other two being Poigai Alvar and Pey Alvar, collectively called Mutalamalvargal who are known to be born out of divinity. Bhoothath composed hundred verses that are classified as Irantam Tiruvantati and his composition is set in the antati style in which the ending syllable is the starting one for the next verse.

As per Hindu legend, Bhoothath was found in a liquorice flower in Thirukadalmallai (modern-day Mahabalipuram). The poet-saint is regarded to have borne such zeal for the Hindu god Vishnu that he was said to have been possessed by a ghost (Bhūta), where he received his epithet.

According to Sri Vaishnava legend, the three Alvars were once were confined in a small dark enclosure during a rain in Thirukovilur and they experienced a fourth individual among them. They found out that it was god Vishnu and Poigai wished to see his face continuously but could view only from the simmering light of the lightning. With a view to maintain the continuity of light, Poigai instantly composed hundred songs wishing light to emerge. Pey and Bhoothath continued composing hundred songs each on Vishnu. The works of these earliest saints contributed to the philosophical and theological ideas of Vaishnavism. Along with the three Shaiva Nayanmars, they influenced the ruling Pallava kings of the South Indian region, resulting in changing the religious geography from Buddhism and Jainism to the two sects of Hinduism.

== Alvars ==
The word alvar means the one who dives deep into the ocean of the countless attributes of god. Alvars are considered the twelve supreme devotees of Vishnu, who were instrumental in popularising Vaishnavism. The religious works of these saints in Tamil, songs of love and devotion, are compiled as Nalayira Divya Prabandham containing 4000 verses and the 108 temples revered in their songs are classified as Divya desam. The saints had different origins and belonged to different castes. As per tradition, the first three Alvars, Poigai, Bhutha and Pey were born miraculously. Tirumizhisai was the son of a sage, Thondaradi, Mathurakavi, Peria and Andal were from brahmin community, Kulasekhara from Kshatria community, Namm was from a cultivator family, Tirupana from panar community and Tirumangai from kalvar community. Divya Suri Saritra by Garuda-Vahana Pandita (11th century AD), Guruparamparaprabavam by Pinbaragiya Perumal Jiyar, Periya tiru mudi adaivu by Anbillai Kandadiappan, Yatindra Pranava Prabavam by Pillai Lokacharya, commentaries on Divya Prabandam, Guru Parampara (lineage of Gurus) texts, temple records and inscriptions give a detailed account of the Alvars and their works. According to these texts, the saints were considered incarnations of some form of Vishnu. Poigai is considered an incarnation of Panchajanya (Krishna's conch), Bhoothath of Kaumodakee (Vishnu's Mace/Club), Pey of Nandaka (Vishnu's sword), Thirumalisai of Sudarshanam (Vishnu's discus), Namm of Vishvaksena (Vishnu's commander), Madhurakavi of Vainatheya (Vishnu's eagle, Garuda), Kulasekhara of Kaustubha (Vishnu's necklace), Periy of Garuda (Vishnu's eagle), Andal of Bhoodevi (Vishnu's wife, Lakshmi, in her form as Bhudevi), Thondaradippodi of Vanamaalai (Vishnu's garland), Thiruppaan of Srivatsa (An auspicious mark on Vishnu's chest) and Thirumangai of Saranga (Rama's bow). The songs of Prabandam are regularly sung in all the Vishnu temples of South India daily and also during festivals.

== Early life ==
Since the saint had intuitive knowledge about god Vishnu, he got the name Bhoothath. As per Hindu legend, Bhoothath was found in a liquorice flower in Thirukadalmallai (modern-day Mahabalipuram). His knowledge on Vishnu is inferred by his description of Vishnu in five different forms as para (supreme being), vyuha (cosmic form), vibhava (incarnations), antaryamin (inner dweller) and archa (consecrated image).

== Composition ==
As per Hindu legend, Vishnu appeared to the mutalam Alvars (first three Alvars) at Thirukkoilur. It was day time, but it darkened and started raining heavily. The wandering Poigai found out a small hide out, which has a space for one person to lie down. Bhoothath arrived there looking for a hiding place and Poigai accommodated him, with both sitting together. In the meanwhile, Pey also came to the same place as all the three preferred to stand because of lack of space. The darkness became dense and inside the small room, they were not able to see each other. In the meanwhile, they felt a fourth person also forced his way among them. The three Alvars realised from the light of the lightning that the fourth one had a charming face that was sublime and divine. The trio could immediately realize that it was Vishnu who was huddling among them. Poigai wished to see Vishnu's face continuously but could view only from the simmering light of the lightning. With a view to maintain the continuity of light, he instantly composed hundred songs wishing the earth to be a big pot full of ghee like an ocean where the Sun could be the burning wick.

Tamil

அன்பே தகளிய ஆர்வமே நெய்யாக
இன்புருகு சிந்தை இடுதிரியா - நன்புருகி
ஞானச் சுடர் விளக்கேற்றினேன் நாரணற்கு
ஞானச் தமிழ் புரிந்த நான்

Transliteration

Anbe Thagliyaa Aarvame Neyyaaga
Inburugu Chintai Idu Thiriyaa
Nanpurugi Gnaana Chudar Vilakku Etrinen
Naaranarku Gnaana Thamizh Purindha Naan

I who wrote this song that bestows wisdom, with love as the lamp, endearing involvement as the lubricant ghee, and knowledge as the wick of the burning torch, dedicated myself to the service of the Lord

Bhoothath Alvar also sang 100 songs imagining to light the lamp constantly through ardent love for Him. Peyalvar sang another 100 songs where he described the enchanting charm of the divine face and the association of Narayana equipped with chakra and sankha, and his divine consort goddess Lakshmi.

Bhoothath composed hundred verses that are classified as Irantam Tiruvantati (Transliteration: Second Tiruvantati). Bhoothath’s composition was set in the antati style. The word anta means end and ati means the beginning. The antati style has ending word or the syllable of each verse as the beginning word of the succeeding verse and the last word of the hundredth verse becomes the beginning of the first verse, making the hundred verses a true garland of verses. The works of these earliest saints contributed to the philosophical and theological ideas of Vaishnavism. The verses of the trio speak of Narayana (another name for Vishnu) as the supreme deity and they refer frequently to Trivikrama and Krishna, the avatars of Vishnu.

== Mangalasasanam ==
There are 30 of his pasurams in the 4000 Divya Prabhandham. He has sung in praise of thirteen temples.

S.No.	Name of the temple	Location	Photo	Number of Pasurams	Presiding deity	Notes/Beliefs
1	Tirupathi	13.143°N 79.907°E		9	Alamelumanga; Venkateswara	Venkateswara Temple is a landmark Vaishnavite temple situated in the hill town of Tirumala at Tirupati in Chittoor district of Andhra Pradesh, India. The Temple is dedicated to Lord Sri Venkateswara, an incarnation of Vishnu, who is believed to have appeared here to save mankind from trials and troubles of Kali Yuga. Hence the place has also got the name Kaliyuga Vaikuntham and Lord here is referred to as Kaliyuga Prathyaksha Daivam. The temple is also known by other names like Tirumala Temple, Tirupati Temple, Tirupati Balaji Temple. Lord Venkateswara is known by many other names: Balaji, Govinda, and Srinivasa. Tirumala Hills are part of Seshachalam Hills range. The hills are 853 metres (2,799 ft) above sea level. The Temple is constructed in Dravidian architecture and is believed to be constructed over a period of time starting from 300 AD. The Garbagriha (Sanctum Sanctorum) is called AnandaNilayam. It is the richest temple in the world in terms of donations received and wealth. The temple is visited by about 50,000 to 100,000 pilgrims daily (30 to 40 million people annually on average), while on special occasions and festivals, like the annual Brahmotsavam, the number of pilgrims shoots up to 500,000, making it the most-visited holy place in the world.
2	Srirangam.	Srirangam, Trichy district Tamil Nadu; 10.8625°N 78.689722°E		4	Ranganayagi; Ranganathar (Periya Perumal)	Srirangam temple is often listed as the largest functioning Hindu temple in the world, the still larger Angkor Wat being the largest existing temple. The temple occupies an area of 156 acres (631,000 m^{2}) with a perimeter of 4,116m (10,710 feet) making it the largest temple in India and one of the largest religious complexes in the world. The annual 21-day festival conducted during the Tamil month of Margali (December–January) attracts 1 million visitors.
3	Thirumaliruncholai	Alagar Koyil, Madurai district, Tamil Nadu9.988609°N 78.2643428°E		3	Sri Sundaravalli sametha Sri Kallazhagar Perumal	Kallazhagar was worshiped by Yama, the Hindu god of death. He requested Vishnu to stay in the place and built a temple with the help of Vishwakarma, the divine architect. Kallazhagar is believed to have appeared to redeem sage Suthapava off his curse from sage Durvasa. The temple houses some rare Vijayanagara sculptures.
4	Thiruparkadal	Heavenly	Kurma	2	Lakshmi; Vishnu	In Hindu cosmology, Thiruparkadal (Ocean of milk) is the fifth from the center of the seven oceans. It surrounds the continent known as Krauncha. According to Hindu mythology, the devas (gods) and asuras (demons) worked together for a millennium to churn the ocean and release Amrita the nectar of immortal life. It is spoken of in the Samudra manthana chapter of the Puranas, a body of ancient Hindu legends. It is also the place where Vishnu reclines over Shesha Naga, along with his consort Lakshmi.
5	Thirukudanthai	Kumbakonam, Thanjavur district, Tamil Nadu; 10.959649°N 79.374999°E		2	Sri Komalavalli sametha Sri Aravamuda Perumal	The temple is called Ubaya Pradhana Kshetram as the Moolavar (presiding deity) and utsavar (festive deity) enjoy the same importance.It is believed that the presiding deity asked Nathamuni to compile the four thousand verses of Nalayira Divya Prabandham at this place. The twin temple chariots weigh 300 t (660,000 lb) each and are next only in size to the ones in Thygaraja temple in Thiruvarur and Andal Temple in Srivilliputhur. This temple is along Kaveri and is one of the Pancharanga Kshetrams.
6	Thirukkoshtiyur	Thirukoshtiyur, Sivaganga district, Tamil Nadu9.98860°N 78.2643°E		2	Sri Mahalakshmi sametha Sri Uraga Mellanayaan Perumal	The temple is known as the place where Ramanuja, the expounder of Vaishnavadatta philosophy preached the holy syllable "Ohm Namo Narayana" to all people irrespective of their caste. Sowmyanarayana Perumal is believed to have appeared as Narasimha avatar to the Devas, the celestial deities.
7	Thirukkachi - Atthigiri	Kanchipuram, Kanchipuram district, Tamil Nadu12.819137°N 79.724646°E		2	Sri Perundevi sametha Sri Devadiraja Perumal	One of the greatest Hindu scholars of Vaishnava VisishtAdvaita philosophy, Ramanuja is believed to have resided in this temple. The temple along with Ekambareswarar Temple and Kamakshi Amman Temple in Kanchipuram is popularly known as Mumurtivasam (abode of trio), while Srirangam is referred to as ‘ The Koil’ (meaning: "temple") and Tirupati as the ‘Malai’ (Meaning: "hill").
8	Thiruppadagam	Kanchipuram, Kanchipuram district, Tamil Nadu12.842726°N 79.696941°E		1	Sri Rukmani sametha Sri Pandavadootha Perumal	The temple is considered one of three oldest temples in Kanchipuram and is believed to have been built by the Pallavas of the late 8th century AD, with later contributions from Medieval Cholas and Vijayanagar kings. The temple is associated with a chapter in Mahabharata when Krishna went to the Kauravas as a missive (called Thoota locally) to the Pandavas.
9	Thirukkovalur	Thirukoyilur, Tiruvannamalai district, Tamil Nadu11.967006°N 79.202479°E		1	Sri Pushpavalli sametha Sri Trivikrama Perumal	The temple is believed to be the place where the first three Alvars, the Vaishnava saints, namely, Poigai Alvar, Bhoothathalvar and Peyalvar attained salvation. The temple is one of the Panchakanna (Krishnaranya) Kshetrams, the five holy temples associated with Krishna, an avatar of Vishnu.
10	Thiruthanjai Mamanikoil	Thanjavur, Thanjavur district, Tamil Nadu; 10.815669°N 79.138677°E		1	Sri Raktapankajavalli sametha Sri Neelamegha Perumal	Unlike other Divyadesams where a single shrine is referred, this set of temples is referred together in all the paasurams(poems). During the Treta Yuga, there were three demons by name Tanchakan, Tantakan and Kacamukan who were blessed by Shiva became very powerful. They grew arrogant and troubled sage Parashara who was doing penance at this place. Vishnu killed Thanjakan after whom Thanjavur was named, with his Chakra, Kachamukan by taking the form of a yali, a mythical creature and took the form of Varaha the boar to kill the third demon Tantakan, who feld to Srimushnam.
11	Thiruneermalai	Kanchipuram, Kanchipuram district, Tamil Nadu12.963808°N 80.114953°E		1	Sri Animamalar Mangai sametha Sri Neervanna Perumal	Brahmanda Purana refers this place Toyatri, meaning a mountain surrounded by water. Thiruneermalai, the modern Tamil name also means a sacred mountain surrounded by water. Among the eight sacred Vishnu temples where he manifested himself called "Ashtaswayamvaka Kshetra".
12	Thirukkadalmallai	Mahabalipuram, Kanchipuram district, Tamil Nadu12.617464°N 80.193303°E		1	Sri Boosthalamangadevi sametha Sri Sthalasayana Perumal	The temple is believed to be the birthplace of the Vaishnava Alvar saint Bhoothathalvar. Sthalasayana Perumal is believed to have appeared to sage Pundarika. The temple is one of the 32 Group of Monuments at Mahabalipuram that are declared as UN world heritage sites, but unlike others that are maintained by the Archaeological Survey of India, the temple is maintained and administered by the Hindu Religious and Endowment Board of the Government of Tamil Nadu.
13	Thiruthangal	Thiruthankal; Virudhunagar district, Tamil Nadu9.010702°N 77.8853°E			Sri Sengamala thaayar sametha Sri Narayana Perumal	The temple in its present form was believed to have been built by Devendra Vallabha, a Pandya king. The temple has three inscriptions in its two rock-cut caves, two dating from the period of 8th century. Ninra Narayana is believed to have appeared to Sridevi and Bhoomadevi. Ranganatha from Srirangam Ranganathaswamy temple was enamoured by the devotion of Andal. He started a journey to Srivilliputhur Divya Desam to seek her hand for marriage. While reaching the place, it became dark and he decided to spend the night in the place. Since he stayed at this place, it came to be known as Thiruthangal and the hillock came to be known as Thalagiri.
