= Pey Alvar =

Sri Vaishnava poet-saint

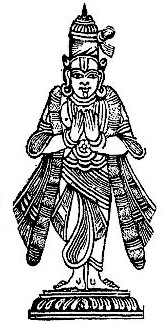

Personal life
- Born: 4203 BCE (Traditional) Mylapore
- Notable work: Munram Tiruvantati
- Honors: Alvar saint, regarded avatar of Nandaka

Religious life
- Religion: Hinduism
- Philosophy: Vaishnava Bhakti

Pey Alvar (also spelt Peyalvar, Peialvar, Pey Azhwar, or Pei Azhwar) is one of the twelve Alvar saints of South India, who are known for their affiliation to Vaishnava tradition of Hinduism. The verses of Alvars are compiled as Nalayira Divya Prabandham and the 108 temples revered are classified as Divya Desams. Pey Alvar is considered third in the list of the three principal Alvars, with the other two being Poigai Alvar and Bhoothath Alvar, collectively called Mutalamalvargal who are known to be born out of divinity. Pey Alvar composed hundred verses that are classified as Munram Tiruvantati and his composition is set in the antati style in which the ending syllable is the starting one for the next verse.

As per Hindu legend, Pey Alvar was found in the lily flower in the pond of the Adi Kesava Perumal Temple in Mylapore. The site can be found in Arundale Street, Mylapore, Chennai. In Tamil, pey refers to one who is possessed and since the saint was madly attracted to Hindu god Vishnu, he got the name.

As per legend, the three Alvars were once were confined in a small dark enclosure during a rain in Thirukovilur and they experienced a fourth individual among them. They found out that it was god Vishnu and Poigai Alvar wished to see his face continuously but could view only from the simmering light of the lightning. With a view to maintain the continuity of light, Poigai instantly composed hundred songs wishing light to emerge. Pey Alvar and Bhoothath Alvar continued composing hundred songs each on Vishnu. The works of these earliest saints contributed to the philosophical and theological ideas of Vaishnavism. Along with the three Saiva Nayanmars, their works influenced the ruling Pallava kings of the South Indian region, resulting in changing the religious geography from Buddhism and Jainism to the two sects of Hinduism.

== Alvars ==
The word alvar means the one who dives deep into the ocean of the countless attributes of god. Alvars are considered the twelve supreme devotees of Vishnu, who were instrumental in popularising Vaishnavism during the 5th-8th centuries CE. The religious works of these saints in Tamil, songs of love and devotion, are compiled as Nalayira Divya Prabandham containing 4000 verses and the 108 temples revered in their songs are classified as Divya desam. The saints had different origins and belonged to different castes. As per tradition, the first three Alvars, Poigai, Bhutha and Pey were born miraculously. Tirumalisai was the son of a sage, Thondaradi, Mathurakavi, Periyalvar and Andal were from the Brahmin community, Kulasekhara from Kshatria community, Nammalvar was from a cultivator family, Tirupanalvar from panar community and Tirumangaiyalvar from kallar community. Divya Suri Saritra by Garuda-Vahana Pandita (11th century CE), Guruparamparaprabavam by Pinbaragiya Perumal Jiyar, Periya tiru mudi adaivu by Anbillai Kandadiappan, Yatindra Pranava Prabavam by Pillai Lokam Jiyar, commentaries on Divya Prabandam, Guru Parampara (lineage of Gurus) texts, temple records and inscriptions give a detailed account of the Alvars and their works. According to these texts, the saints were considered incarnations of some form of Vishnu. Poigai is considered an incarnation of Panchajanya (Krishna's conch), Bhoothath of Kaumodakee (Vishnu's Mace/Club), Pey of Nandaka (Vishnu's sword), Thirumalisai of Sudarshanam (Vishnu's discus), Nammalvar of Vishvaksena (Vishnu's commander), Madhurakavi of Vainatheya (Vishnu's snake, Seshanaga), Kulasekhara of Kaustubha (Vishnu's necklace), Periy of Garuda (Vishnu's eagle), Andal of Bhoodevi (Vishnu's wife, Lakshmi, in her form as Bhudevi), Thondaradippodi of Vanamaalai (Vishnu's garland), Thiruppaanalvar of Srivatsa (An auspicious mark on Vishnu's chest) and Thirumangaiyalvar of Saranga (Rama's bow). The songs of Prabandam are regularly sung in all the Vishnu temples of South India daily and also during festivals.

According to traditional account by Manavala Mamunigal, the first three Alvars namely Poigai, Bhoothath and Pey Alvar belong to Dvapara Yuga (before 4200 BCE), as per the details, all Alvars lived around 4300 BCE–900 CE. Some modern scholars suggest that they lived during 5th–8th century, although such estimates lack evidence. But it is widely accepted by tradition and historians that the trio are the earliest among the twelve Alvars. Along with the three Saiva nayanmars, they influenced the ruling Pallava kings, creating a Bhakti movement that resulted in changing the religious geography from Buddhism and Jainism to these two sects of Hinduism in the region. The Alvars were also instrumental in promoting the Bhagavatha cult and the two epics of India, namely, Ramayana and Mahabaratha. The Alvars were instrumental in spreading Vaishnavism throughout the region. The verses of the various Alvars were compiled by Nathamuni (824-924 CE), a 10th-century Vaishnavite theologian, who called it the "Tamil Veda".

== Early life ==
In Tamil, pey refers to one who is possessed and since the saint was madly attracted to Hindu god Vishnu, he got the name. As per Hindu legend, Pey Alvar was found in the lily flower in the pond of the Adikesava Perumal temple, Mylapore (historically called Manikaivaram), a suburb in Chennai. He is also called Mahadahvaya and Mylapuradapadhi.

== Composition ==
As per Hindu legend, Vishnu appeared to the mutalam Alvars (first three Alvars) at Thirukkoilur. It was day time, but it darkened and started raining heavily. The wandering Poigai found out a small hide out, which has a space for one person to lie down. Boodath arrived there looking for a hiding place and Poigai accommodated him, with both sitting together. In the meanwhile, Pey Alvar also came to the same place as all the three preferred to stand because of lack of space. The darkness became dense and inside the small room, they were not able to see each other. In the meanwhile, they felt a fourth person also forced his way among them. The three Alvars realised from the light of the lightning that the fourth one had a charming face that was sublime and divine. The trio could immediately realize that it was Vishnu who was huddling among them. Poigai wished to see Vishnu's face continuously but could view only from the simmering light of the lightning. With a view to maintain the continuity of light, he instantly composed hundred songs wishing the earth to be a big pot full of ghee like an ocean where the Sun could be the burning wick.

Tamil
திருக்கண்டேன் பொன் மேனி கண்டேன் திகழும்
அருக்கனணி நிறமும் கண்டேன் - செருக்கிளரும்
பொன்னாழி கண்டேன் புரி சங்கம் கைக்கண்டேன்
என்னாழி வண்ணன் பால் இன்று

Transliteration
Tiruk Kanden Pon Meni Kanden- Thigazhum
Arukkan Ani Niramum Kanden-Seruk Kilarum
Pon Aazhi Kanden Puri Sangam Kai Kanden
En Aazhi Vannan Paal Inru

I found the glorious, golden form of the Lord

Bhoothath Alvar also sang 100 songs imagining to light the lamp constantly through ardent love for Him. Pey Alvar sang another 100 songs where he described the enchanting charm of the divine face and the association of Narayana equipped with chakra and sankha, and his divine consort goddess Lakshmi.

Pey Alvar composed hundred verses that are classified as Munram Tiruvantati. Pey Alvar's composition was set in the antati style. The word Andha means end and Adi means beginning. antati style has ending word or the syllable of each verse as the beginning word of the succeeding verse and the last word of the hundredth verse becomes the beginning of the first verse, making the hundred verses a true garland of verses. The works of these earliest saints contributed to the philosophical and theological ideas of Vaishnavism. The verses of the trio speak of Narayana (another name for Vishnu) as the supreme deity and they refer frequently to Trivikrama and Krishna, the avatars of Vishnu.

== Mangalasasanam ==
There are 39 of his paasurams in the 4000 Divya Prabhandham. He has sung in praise of fourteen temples.

S.No.	Name of the temple	Location	Photo	Number of Pasurams	Presiding deity	Notes/Beliefs
1	Tirupathi	13.143°N 79.907°E		18	Alamelumanga; Venkateswara	Venkateswara Temple is a landmark Vaishnavite temple situated in the hill town of Tirumala at Tirupati in Chittoor district of Andhra Pradesh, India. The Temple is dedicated to Lord Sri Venkateswara, an incarnation of Vishnu, who is believed to have appeared here to save mankind from trials and troubles of Kali Yuga. Hence the place has also got the name Kaliyuga Vaikuntham and Lord here is referred to as Kaliyuga Prathyaksha Daivam. The temple is also known by other names like Tirumala Temple, Tirupati Temple, Tirupati Balaji Temple. Lord Venkateswara is known by many other names: Balaji, Govinda, and Srinivasa. Tirumala Hills are part of Seshachalam Hills range. The hills are 853 metres (2,799 ft) above sea level. The Temple is constructed in Dravidian architecture and is believed to be constructed over a period of time starting from 300 CE. The Garbagriha (Sanctum Sanctorum) is called AnandaNilayam. It is the richest temple in the world in terms of donations received and wealth. The temple is visited by about 50,000 to 100,000 pilgrims daily (30 to 40 million people annually on average), while on special occasions and festivals, like the annual Brahmotsavam, the number of pilgrims shoots up to 500,000, making it the most-visited holy place in the world.
2	Thiruparkadal	Heavenly	Kurma	4	Lakshmi; Vishnu	In Hindu cosmology, Thiruparkadal (Ocean of milk) is the fifth from the center of the seven oceans. It surrounds the continent known as Krauncha. According to Hindu mythology, the devas (gods) and asuras (demons) worked together for a millennium to churn the ocean and release Amrita the nectar of immortal life. It is spoken of in the Samudra manthana chapter of the Puranas, a body of ancient Hindu legends. It is also the place where Vishnu reclines over Shesha Naga, along with his consort Lakshmi.
3	Thiruvelukkai	Kanchipuram, Kanchipuram district, Tamil Nadu12.822197°N 79.706450°E		3	Sri Amritavalli sametha Sri Yoga Narasimha Perumal	Azhagiya Singar is believed to have appeared to slay Hiranya, the demon king. Velukkai is derived from Vel (desire) and irukkai (place of stay), meaning the place where Vishnu desired to stay, which became Velukkai from Velirukkai.
4	Srirangam.	Srirangam, Trichy district Tamil Nadu; 10.8625°N 78.689722°E		2	Ranganayagi; Ranganathar (Periya Perumal)	Srirangam temple is often listed as the largest functioning Hindu temple in the world, the still larger Angkor Wat being the largest existing temple. The temple occupies an area of 156 acres (631,000 m^{2}) with a perimeter of 4,116m (10,710 feet) making it the largest temple in India and one of the largest religious complexes in the world. The annual 21-day festival conducted during the Tamil month of Margaḻi (December–January) attracts 1 million visitors.
5	Thirukudanthai	Kumbakonam, Thanjavur district, Tamil Nadu; 10.959649°N 79.374999°E		2	Sri Komalavalli sametha Sri Aravamuda Perumal	The temple is called Ubaya Pradhana Kshetram as the Moolavar (presiding deity) and utsavar (festive deity) enjoy the same importance. It is believed that the presiding deity asked Nathamuni to compile the four thousand verses of Nalayira Divya Prabandham at this place. The twin temple chariots weigh 300 t (660,000 lb) each and are next only in size to the ones in Thygaraja temple in Thiruvarur and Andal Temple in Srivilliputhur. This temple is along Kaveri and is one of the Pancharanga Kshetrams.
6	Thiruvinnagar	Tirunageswaram, Thanjavur district, Tamil Nadu; 10.961570°N 79.432080°E		2	Sri Bhumidevi sametha Sri Uppiliappan Perumal	It is believed that Vishnu appeared as Uppiliappan to marry sage Hemarishi's daughter who was Lakshmi's avatar. Since the sage quoted that her girl is too young that she doesn't even know how to cook with salt, Vishnu agreed to accept offering without salt.
7	Paramapadam	Heavenly	Vishnu, Lord of Vaikuntha	1	Lakshmi; Vishnu	Vaikuntha is the celestial abode of Vishnu, who is one of the principal deities of Hinduism and the supreme being in its Vaishnavism tradition. Vaikuntha is an abode exclusive to him, his consort the goddess Lakshmi and other liberated souls that have gained moksha. They are blessed with pure bliss and happiness in the company of the supreme being for all eternity.
8	Thirumaliruncholai	Alagar Koyil, Madurai district, Tamil Nadu9.988609°N 78.2643428°E		1	Sri Sundaravalli sametha Sri Kallazhagar Perumal	Kallazhagar was worshiped by Yama, the Hindu god of death. He requested Vishnu to stay in the place and built a temple with the help of Vishwakarma, the divine architect. Kallazhagar is believed to have appeared to redeem sage Suthapava off his curse from sage Durvasa. The temple houses some rare Vijayanagara sculptures.
9	Thirukkoshtiyur	Thirukoshtiyur, Sivaganga district, Tamil Nadu9.98860°N 78.2643°E		1	Sri Mahalakshmi sametha Sri Uraga Mellanayaan Perumal	The temple is known as the place where Ramanuja, the expounder of Vaishnavadatta philosophy, preached the holy syllable "Ohm Namo Narayana" to all people irrespective of their caste. Sowmyanarayana Perumal is believed to have appeared as Narasimha avatar to the Devas, the celestial deities.
10	Thirukkachi - Atthigiri	Kanchipuram, Kanchipuram district, Tamil Nadu12.819137°N 79.724646°E		1	Sri Perundevi sametha Sri Devadiraja Perumal	One of the greatest Hindu scholars of Vaishnava VisishtAdvaita philosophy, Ramanuja is believed to have resided in this temple. The temple along with Ekambareswarar Temple and Kamakshi Amman Temple in Kanchipuram is popularly known as Mumurtivasam (abode of trio), while Srirangam is referred to as ‘ The Koil’ (meaning: "temple") and Tirupati as the ‘Malai’ (Meaning: "hill").
11	Thiruppadagam	Kanchipuram, Kanchipuram district, Tamil Nadu12.842726°N 79.696941°E		1	Sri Rukmani sametha Sri Pandavadootha Perumal	The temple is considered one of three oldest temples in Kanchipuram and is believed to have been built by the Pallavas of the late 8th century CE, with later contributions from Medieval Cholas and Vijayanagar kings. The temple is associated with a chapter in Mahabharata when Krishna went to the Kauravas as a missive (called Thoota locally) to the Pandavas.
12	Thiruvallikeni	Chennai, Chennai district, Tamil Nadu13.053920°N 80.276942°E		1	Sri Rukmini sametha Sri Venkatakrishna Perumal	The name Parthasarathy, in Tamil, means the 'charioteer of Arjuna', referring to Krishna's role as a charioteer to Arjuna in the epic Mahabaratha. It was originally built by the Pallavas in the 8th century and considered the oldest structure in Chennai.
13	Thirukkadigai	Sholinghur, Vellore district, Tamil Nadu13.093698°N 79.424626°E		1	Sri Amritavalli sametha Sri Yoga Narasimha Perumal	The temple has twin hills, with the one of Yoga Narasimha called the Periya malai (big hill) 750 ft (230 m) tall and occupying an area of 1.25 acres (5,100 m^{2}). The top of the hill is approached through a flight of 1,305 steps. The temple is seen as one of the famous temples of Narasimha and a powerful image of Hanuman. Manavala Mamunigal is believed to have performed enunciation of Thirupavai at this place on the request of his disciple Erumbiappa. The town originally was under the control of Shaivites which is substantiated by the temple ruins near Parappan Kulam, in the valley between two hills. This is where original Sholinghur was situated. Unfinished Nandhis and Sthupas are found in numerous places in Sholinghur.
14	Ashtabuyagaram	Kanchipuram, Kanchipuram district, Tamil Nadu12.822736°N 79.710806°E		1	Sri Padmasani sametha Sri Ashtabhuja Perumal	The elephant Gajendra, used to worship Vishnu with the lotus fetched from the temple tank every day. Once while picking up lotus, a crocodile caught the leg of Gajendra, who started calling the name of Vishnu for help. Vishnu sent his discus to punish the crocodile and relieve the elephant. The presiding deity is addressed by various names like Adikesava Perumal, Gajendra Varadhan and Chakradhar.

== Sources ==
- B. S., Chandrababu; S., Ganeshram; C., Bhavani (2011). History of People and Their Environs. Bharathi Puthakalayam. ISBN 9789380325910.
- Chari, S. M. Srinivasa (1997). Philosophy and Theistic Mysticism of the Āl̲vārs. Motilal Banarsidass Publishers. ISBN 9788120813427.
- Dalal, Roshen (2011). Hinduism: An Alphabetical Guide. Penguin Books India. ISBN 9780143414216.
