= Alvars =

Tamil poet-saints of South India

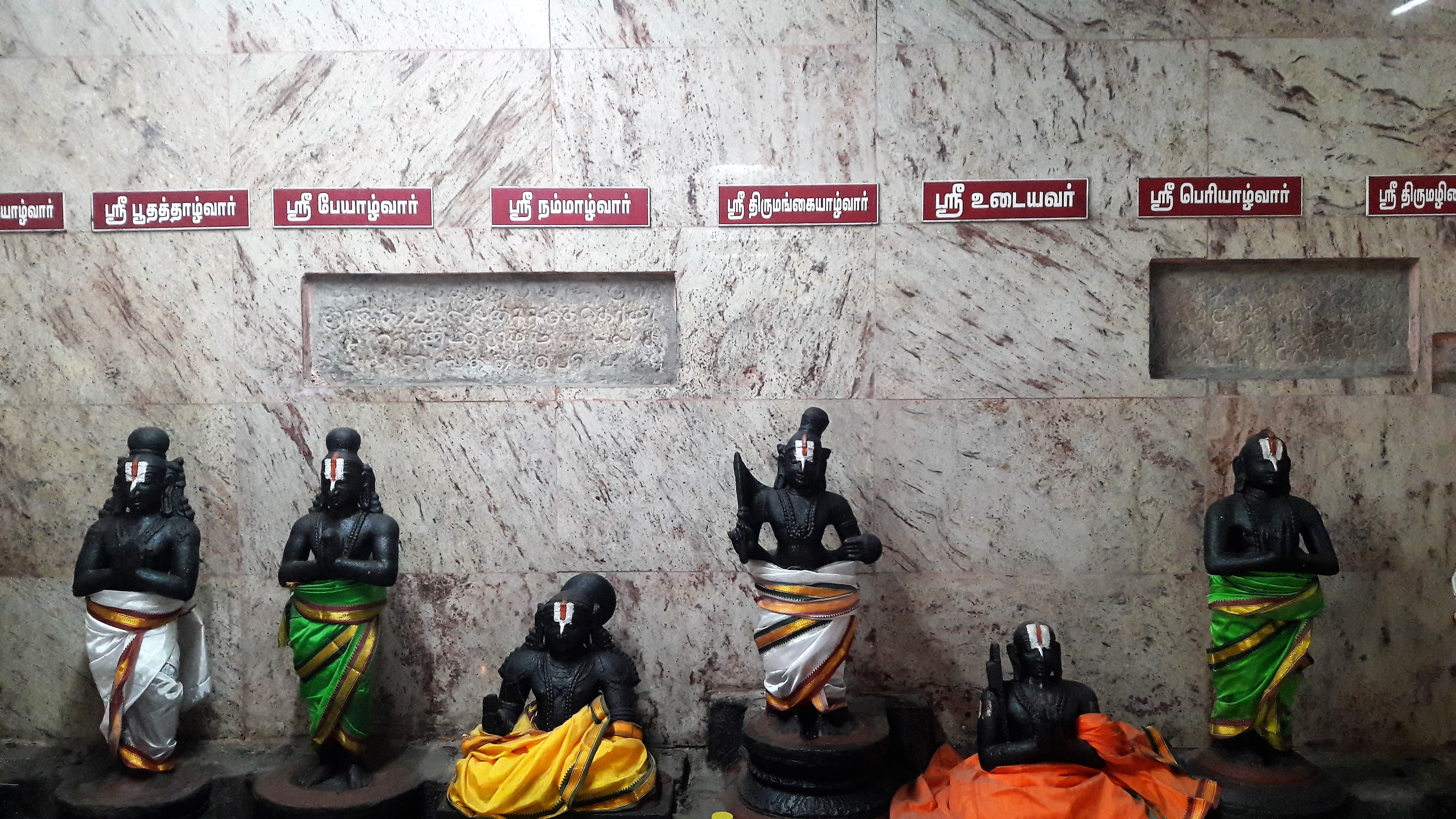

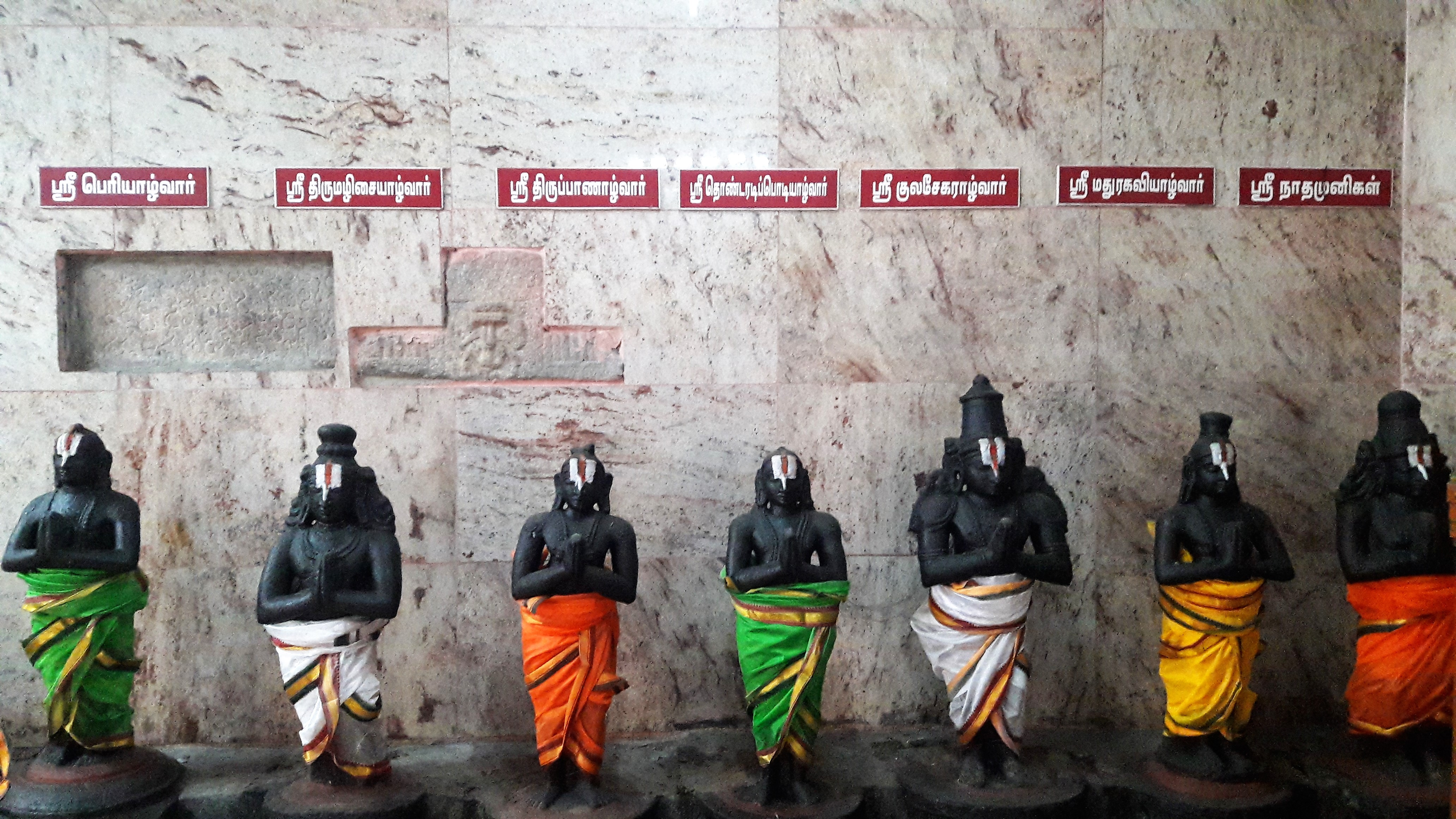
Murtis of the Alvars, Ninra Narayana temple: (From the left: First row: Periyalvar, Tirumalisai Alvar, Tiruppan Alvar, Tondaradippodi Alvar, Kulashekara Alvar, and Madhurakavi Alvar, also featuring Nathamuni. Second Row: Bhootathalvar, Peyalvar, Nammalvar, and Tirumangai Alvar, also featuring Ramanuja)

Personal life
- Region: Tamilakam
- Notable work: Naalayira Divya Prabandham
- Known for: Bhakti movement

Religious life
- Religion: Hinduism
- Denomination: Vaishnavism
- Philosophy: Vishishtadvaita
- School: Bhagavata

Religious career
- Influenced: Regional Vaishnava movements

The Alvars (Tamil: ஆழ்வார், romanized: Āḻvār, lit. 'The Immersed') were the Tamil poet-saints of South India who espoused bhakti (devotion) to the Hindu preserver deity Vishnu through their songs of longing, ecstasy, and service. They are venerated in Vaishnavism, which regards Vishnu as the Ultimate Reality.

Traditional accounts list ten Alvars, though other references that include Andal and Madhurakavi Alvar, bringing the total to twelve. Together with the 63 contemporary Shaivite Nayanars, they are among the most important saints from Tamil Nadu.

The Alvars are considered the twelve supreme devotees of Vishnu in Sri Vaishnavism and were instrumental in popularising Vaishnavism across Tamil-speaking regions. They were also influential in promoting the Bhagavata Sampradaya and the two Hindu epics, the Ramayana and the Mahabharata.

The hymns of the Alvars are compiled as the Naalayira Divya Prabandham, a collection of 4,000 verses, and the 108 temples revered in their hymns are classified as Divya Desams. The verses of the Alvars were compiled by Nathamuni (824–924 CE), a 9th-century Vaishnavite theologian, who referred to the canon as the "Dravida Veda" or the "Tamil Veda". The songs of the Prabandham are regularly recited in various Vishnu temples across South India, both during daily rituals and during festivals.

== List of the twelve Alvars ==
The Alvars are described as corresponding to the 63 Shaivite Nayanars (devotees of Shiva) mentioned in the Periyapurana. Tradition counts twelve Alvars:

1. Poygai Āḻvār
2. Putattāḻvār
3. Pey Āḻvār
4. Tirumaḻiśai Āḻvār
5. Nammāḻvār
6. Madhurakavi Āḻvār
7. Kulaśekhara Āḻvār
8. Periyāḻvār
9. Āṇḍāḷ
10. Toṇḍaraḍippoḍi Āḻvār
11. Tiruppan Āḻvār
12. Tirumaṅgai Āḻvār

Andal is the only female Alvar.

These twelve Alvars flourished between the fifth and eighth centuries A.D., representing a significant phase in Vaisnava philosophy

== Etymology ==
The precise meaning of the term Āḻvār (often transliterated as Alvar or Azhwar) has been debated. The common understanding is that the traditional meaning is derived from the Tamil root āḻ or azh (ஆழ்) which means "deep". From this, definitions such as "one who has plunged deep into the divine" , "who is immersed in deep meditation" , "god-intoxicated mystics" , and "one who is deeply immersed in God's experience" are commonly given.

Scholars like S. Palaniappan (2004) argue that the original term āḷvār underwent a process of sound variation, taking the form āḻvār. This linguistic shift and the subsequent folk etymology are seen to have occurred over approximately two centuries in the Srirangam area. Some linguistic analyses show that the term was initially āḷvār (from the verbal root āḷ), meaning "to rule". In this sense it could mean "those who rule, lords". This interpretation is supported by its semantic parallel with Nāyaṉār ("lord, master"), the title given to Saivite saints. Early temple inscriptions also give weight to this etymology. The term āḷvāṉ (singular masculine form of āḷvār) is also found in earlier texts, including in reference to Vishnu's devotees and even to Vishnu himself. Andal, the only woman Alvar, is referred to as āṇṭāḷ "the lady" (literally "she who rules"). This is seen as a fairly precise semantic parallel to āḷvār in the sense of "lord" or "ruler".

== Historical timeline ==
Traditionally the Alvars are said to have lived in ancient times. The first three Alvars (Poygai Alvar, Bhutattalvar, Peyalvar) are believed to have been born at the end of the Dvapara Yuga, corresponding to around 4203 BCE. Madhurakavi is believed to have also been born in Dvapara Yuga, corresponding to 3222 BCE. Nammalvar, Kulashekhara Alvar, Periyalvar, and Andal are placed in the first century of the Kali Yuga (3102 BCE - 3005 BCE). Specific dates such as Nammalvar in 3102 BCE, Kulashekhara in 2075 BCE, Periyalvar in 3056 BCE, and Andal in 3005 BCE are also given. Thondaradippodi Alvar, Thiruppaan Alvar, and Thirumangai Alvar are dated to 2803 BCE, 758 BCE, and 2702 BCE respectively.

The Encyclopædia Britannica says that Alvars lived between 7th and 10th centuries CE. Professor of Religion and Asian Studies, James G. Lochtefeld of Carthage College, notes in his The Illustrated Encyclopedia of Hinduism, the first three Alvars Poigai, Bhoothath and Pey belonged to the 7th century; while Nammalvar and Madhurakavi belonged to the 10th century, and the rest of them lived in the 9th century.

Modern scholarship generally places the Alvars in the early medieval period. Most sources agree that the Alvars "probably lived between the sixth and the tenth centuries CE", or more specifically, between the fifth and eighth centuries CE. One source suggests their age as a class lies "between somewhere about the commencement of the 3rd century A.D. and the 9th century." This period aligns with the Pallava, Chola, and Pandya kingdoms in Tamil Nadu, a time when Tamil bhakti literature emerged.

A significant point in dating the Alvars is their relationship with Ramanuja. Scholars agree that the Alvars considerably predated Ramanuja, as his theology was heavily influenced by their teachings. This refutes earlier views by Bishop Caldwell and M. Seshagiri Sastriar, who mistakenly believed the Alvars were disciples of Ramanuja.

== Legend and hagiography ==
=== Sources ===
The legendary information surrounding the Alvars is primarily derived from a variety of Vaishnava hagiographical works, alongside insights from their own literary compositions. These sources often present traditional accounts that blend historical elements with miraculous anecdotes and theological interpretations.

There are many texts that serve as key source material for the Alvar legends. The Divyasuricarita by Garuḍavāhana Paṇḍita in the 11th century CE is considered the earliest poetical work detailing the biographies of the Alvars. The Guruparampara Prabhavam is found in multiple variations such as Guruparamparāprabhāvam-ārāyirappaḍi by Pinpaḻakiyaperumāḷ Jīyar in the 13th century CE, and Guruparamparāprabhāvam-mūvāyirappaḍi by Tṛtīya Brahmatantra Parakālasvāmi in the 14th century CE. The Vārtta Malai by an unknown author of "a fairly late date" also recounts some stories and the Ramanuja connection. The Upadeśa Ratnamālai by Manavala Mahāmuni and Periya Thirumaḍi Aḍaivu by Koil Kandāḍai Nāyan, both from the 15th century CE, also provide biographical details.

=== Divine origins and miraculous births ===
A central theme of the Alvar legends is their divine origin, with Vishnu reportedly sending his various insignia to Earth to be incarnated as the Alvars. For example, Poygai Alvar is believed to be the incarnation of Vishnu's conch (sangu), Bhoothath Alvar of his spiritual mace (kowmodhakam), and Pey Alvar of the Nandaka sword. Other Alvars are linked to Vishnu's divine attendants or attributes, such as Nammalvar as Vishvaksena, Kulasekhara Alvar as the Kaustubha gem, Periyalvar as Garuda, and Tirumangai Alvar as Vishnu's bow.

Many are said to have had supernatural births. Poygai Alvar reportedly emerged from a lotus flower, Bhoothath Alvar from a madhavi flower, and Pey Alvar from a red lotus. Andal was discovered as an infant in a flower garden, and Nammalvar was found by his foster parents in the hollow of a tamarind tree.

=== Specific alvar legends ===
The first three Alvars (Poygai, Bhoothath, Pey Alvar) are said to have been born on three consecutive days and later met by chance in a narrow passageway (itaikkali) in Tirukkovalur during a storm, where Vishnu revealed himself to them. Nammalvar is said to have remained in yogic meditation under a tamarind tree until the age of sixteen, speaking his first words as an esoteric answer to Madhurakavi Alvar.

Tirumangai Alvar's life recounts his transformation from a brigand to a saint. Legends include him robbing a Buddhist shrine to fund the construction of the fourth wall (prakara) of the Srirangam temple, with the Lord's assistance. He also reportedly engaged in a poetical contest with the Saiva saint Sambandar. The only female Alvar, Andal is renowned as a bridal mystic who vowed to marry only Vishnu/Krishna. Her legend culminates in her mystical marriage to Lord Ranganatha at Srirangam, where she is said to have been absorbed into the deity.

One legend recounts that when a Pandyan king tried to coerce Tirumalisai Alvar's disciple, Kannikrishna, to compose songs in his honor, Vishnu himself left his temple to follow the Alvar, only returning after the king humbly apologized. Tiruppan Alvar's legend highlights that he was carried on the shoulders of a temple priest, despite belonging to the lowest caste (panchama/outcaste), into the sanctum sanctorum of Srirangam, where he merged with the deity.

== Works ==
=== Naalayira Divya Prabandham ===
The main collection of works of devotional poetry created by the Alvars, compiled by Nathamuni, is known as the Naalayira Divya Prabandham, with 4,000 verses. These works include:

- Tirupallāṇḍu
- Periyāḻvār Tirumoḻi
- Tiruppāvai
- Nācciyār Tirumoḻi
- Perumāḻ Tirumoḻi
- Tiruccanda Viruttam
- Tirumālai
- Tirupaḻḻi-eḻucci
- Amalanādipirāṇ
- Kaṇṇinuṇ-Śiruttāmbu
- Periya Tirumoḻi
- Tirukkuruntāṇḍakam
- Tiruneḍuntāṇḍakam
- Mudal Tiruvandādi
- Iraṇḍām Tiruvandādi
- Mūṉṟām Tiruvandādi
- Nāṉmukaṉ Tiruvandādi
- Tiruviruttam
- Tiruvāciriyam
- Periya Tiruvandādi
- Tiruveḻukūṟṟirukkai
- Śiriya Tirumaḍal
- Periya Tirumaḍal
- Tiruvāymoḻi

After the era of the Alvars, a few of the poems from the Divya Prabandham were said to be lost. Nathamuni in the 10th century is said to have gone on search for these lost works and was blessed with the revelation of three short works by Nammalvar and around 20 poems composed by other poets.

=== Commentaries and other works ===
These works have been the subject of extensive commentaries and other literary works by later scholars and saints. These are:

- On the entire corpus:
  - Commentary by Periyavāccān Piḷḷai.
  - Commentary by Periya Parakālasvāmi.
  - Nigama Parimaḷa by Vedānta Deśika
- Commentaries on the Tiruvāymoḻi:
  - Ārāyirappaḍi by Tirukkurukaipirān Piḷḷān, a direct disciple of Ramanuja (1068 CE).
    - sub-commentary on Ārāyirappaḍi called Irupattunālāyirappāḍi by Vedānta Rāmānuja/Sākṣātsvāmi (1700 CE).
  - Oṉpadināyirappaḍi by Nañjīyar (1113 CE).
  - Irupattunālāyirappāḍi by Periyavāccān Piḷḷai (1168 CE).
  - Īḍu Muppattiyārāyarappāḍi by Vaḍakkutiruvīdi Piḷḷai (1167 CE).
  - Pannirāyirappāḍi by Vādikesarī Aḻakiamaṇavāḷa Jīyar (1242 CE).
  - Oṉpadināyirappaḍi by Raṅgarāmānuja (1650 CE).
  - Padinettāyirappaḍi by Periya Parakālasvāmi (1676 CE).

== Philosophy ==
The poetry of the Alvars echoes bhakti to God through love, and in the ecstasy of such devotion they sang hundreds of songs which embodied both depth of feeling and the felicity of expressions. The philosophy of the Āḻvārs is fundamentally rooted in devotion (bhakti) to Viṣṇu and forms the spiritual and theological basis for the Viśiṣṭādvaita Vedānta system. Their poetic compositions, collected as the Nālāyira Divya Prabandham, are viewed as the "Dravida Vedam" (Tamil Veda), containing the quintessence of Upanishadic teachings and philosophical ideas disseminated through the Tamil language to the common people. Their teachings cover the three fundamental doctrines of Vedānta: tattva (ultimate reality), hita (means of attainment), and puruṣārtha (supreme goal of life).

=== The doctrine of ultimate reality (tattva) ===
The Āḻvārs posit Vishnu/Narayana as the supreme deity (paratattva) and the sole ultimate reality. They uphold the Saviśeṣa Brahma-vāda, viewing Brahman as the absolute endowed with infinite auspicious attributes (guṇa). Narayana is described as Sarveśvara, the Lord of all, including Brahma and Rudra (Shiva), and the primary cause of the universe's creation, sustenance, and dissolution. They emphasize the theological belief in the inseparability of Viṣṇu and Śrī (Lakshmi), with the Goddess acting as the mediatrix.

The Āḻvārs refer to five manifestations (avatāra) of God that make the divine accessible:

1. Para (The transcendent form in Vaikuṇṭha)
2. Vyūha (The expansive form, e.g., lying in the milky ocean)
3. Vibhava (Incarnations like Rama and Krishna)
4. Arcā (The iconic form enshrined in temples)
5. Antaryāmin (The inner controller dwelling within every sentient and non-sentient entity)

Among the five forms in which Vishnu manifests according to Alvar theology, the concept of Antaryamin occupied a particularly significant place in the devotional experience of the Alvars. Chari locates this doctrine within what he calls the 'Divine Activities' (divya charitrani) of God, describing Antaryamin as the mode through which God exercises constant and intimate control over all things from within, as their inner self and ruler. This understanding is grounded in the Antaryami Brahmana of the Brihadaranyaka Upanishad, which describes God as the one who dwells within the earth, within the earth, within fire, within every living being, yet remains unseen and unknown to them while directing them from within.

The Kṛṣṇa avatāra holds special importance due to its display of God's easy accessibility (saulabhya). The devotion of the Āḻvārs was largely temple-centred, praising the local deities (divya deśams). They frequently glorify God's protective and merciful nature, highlighting attributes such as easy accessibility (saulabhya) and gracious condescension (sauśīlya).

The Alvars also describe the nature of the individual self (jīvātman) as an eternal spiritual entity characterized by knowledge (jnāna) and bliss (ānanda), yet eternally subordinate (śeṣa-bhūta) to the Supreme Being. They frequently used the term adiyēn (subservient) to signify their dependence on God. A distinctive theological concept in their hymns is the idea of subordination not only to God, but also to the devotees of God, expressing the ideal of becoming the servant of the servants, who are servants to the servants of God's servants. For the Alvars, this was not merely a philosophical abstraction but the lived foundation of their devotional relationship with God - the recognition that the very self within them was inseparable from the divine presence. Nammalvar in particular expressed this experience repeatedly in the Tiruvaymoli, describing God as the indwelling reality within his own soul, making the devotional union not an aspiration toward something distant but a recognition of what was already and always present.

=== The path to attainment (hita) ===
The core philosophy of the Āḻvārs is the promotion of Bhakti (fervent devotion), which they considered the great way of salvation.

The central ideology is the idea of absolute surrender to the deity. They advocated implicit faith, ardent devotion, and utter surrender of will and action to Viṣṇu. Prapatti (self-surrender) is often seen as the only effective means (sādhana) for complete and final liberation.

The attainment of God is believed to be possible only through the Lord's grace. They accepted both grace linked to human effort (sahetuka-kṛpā) and spontaneous, unconditioned grace (nirhetuka-kṛpā).

This devotional path is also expressed through the hymns of key Alvars, notably Nammalvar and Tirumangai Alvar, who often assume the role of the female beloved (nāyaki) longing for Vishnu, the divine lover (nāyaka). This utilizes the imagery of erotic love (śṛṅgāra rasa or rati-bhāva) as an allegory for the spiritual quest and the soul's intense craving for union with the Divine. This mystic experience alternates between the joy of communion (samśleṣa) and the anguish of separation (viraha or viśleṣa).

=== The supreme goal (puruṣārtha) ===
The ultimate goal of life is Moksha (liberation, or vidu). Moksha is described as the realization of the blissful Brahman (Brahmānandānubhava). The theological concept of the ultimate goal emphasizes continuous and uninterrupted divine service (Bhāgavat-kaiṅkarya) to the Lord in His eternal abode, Vaikuṇṭha (Paramapada). Nammalvar asserts that he would prefer service to the Lord over moksha itself.

=== Influence on Vishishtadvaita Vedanta ===
The hymns of the Alvars provided the devotional and doctrinal foundation upon which the Acharyas Nathamuni, Yamuna, and Ramanuja later built the systematic philosophy of Vishishtadvaita Vedanta. According to Chari, the Alvars had already articulated in the Tamil medium the three fundamental doctrines of Vedanta - tattva (the nature of ultimate reality), hita (the means of attaining it), and purushartha (the supreme goal of life) which is already discussed above - and their main objective was to disseminate the essential tenets of Vedantic philosophy among ordinary people through Tamil. Ramanuja, who followed in the tradition established by Nathamuni, accorded to the Nalayira Divyaprabandham a status equal to that of the Sanskrit Veda, regarding it as containing the quintessence of Vedic teachings.

The specific influence of the Alvars on Ramanuja operated through several channels. The Tiruvaymoli of Nammalvar, comprising 1,102 verses, was the primary source through which the philosophical and theological doctrines of the Alvars reached Ramanuja and his successors; Nathamuni himself extolled Nammalvar as one who had rendered the Veda into tamil. The Alvars' hymns embody the philosophy of the Upanishads as later interpreted by Ramanuja, together with the Vaishnava theology developed on the basis of the Vedas, the Pancharatra Agamas, the Epics, and the Vaishnava Puranas. Chari indentifies this relationship as the theory of ubhaya-vedanta - the dual Vedanta - in which the Sanskrit Vedic corpus and the Tamil Prabandham are regarded as two streams of equal authority flowing from the same source.

Varadachari similarly describes the Alvars as having prepared the ground for a great philosophical system, noting that they provided the springs from which the waters of ecstatic devotion and ituitive wisdom gushed out to form a mighty stream that successive acharyas channelled into systematic thought. The influence of the Prabandham extended beyond Ramanuja to later acharyas including Vedanta Deshika, Manavalamamuni, and Pillai Lokacharya, each of whom drew deeply from the hymns of the Alvars and developed further the philosophical doctrines enshrined in them.

== Place in the Bhakti movement ==
The Alvars are widely regarded as the originators of the Bhakti movement in India. According to Varadachari, the Bhakti movement in India owes its origin to the Alvars, whose religious mysticism established devotion to a personal God as a distinct and self-sufficient spiritual path. Their hymns were composed in Tamil rather than Sanskrit, making the devotional path accessible to ordinary people regardless of caste or learning, and this democratisation of religious experience was central to the movement's wider spread.

The Alvars lived during the period of the Pallava, Pandya, and Chola kingdoms in South India and were itinerant saints who travelled extensively across the Tamil-speaking regions, visiting Vishnu shrines in Tonda-nadu, Pandi-nadu, Vada-nadu and Sola-nadu and celebrating their glory through Tamil hymnology. Their sole concern, as Chari describes it, was the one Ultimate Reality (paratattva), beyond time and space, whom they identified as Vishnu. The Vaishnava movement in South India gathered momentum as the Pallavas established their empire, and the Alvars witnessed the rise and fall of principalities while remaining devoted entirely to the propagation of total surrender to the Godhead.

A parallel movement flourished simultaneously among the Shaivite saints of the same period. The Shaiva school of bhakti as sung by the Nayanars during the same period (700-900 CE) both received from and gave impetus to the growth of a devotional approach to God across South India, and together these two movements - Vaishnava and Shaiva - formed the foundation of Tamil devotional religion. This devotional impulse later moved northward, where it nourished and influenced the various devotional sects of Chaitanya, Kabir, and others across the Indian subcontinent.

The religious mysticism of the Alvars was distinguished by its deeply personal and devotional character. Varadachari characterizes it as suffused with love for the personality of God and awareness of his superhuman deeds in the world. Wonder, awe, love, and faith combined to produce an intense spirit of self-giving and seeking God for his own sake, which Varadachari identifies as the mark of a fully developed mysticism. This mysticism operated through the medium of inspired song, with contemplation through hymn-singing culminating in a vision of the Divine and, at its highest, the absorption of the saint's soul into the body of God.

The Alvars also represented a synthesis of the Vedic outlook and the Agama ideology. Their hymns show awareness of Vedic mantras being recited in the shrines they visited and of fire-rituals being performed, situating their devotional movement firmly within the broader framework of Vedic culture. Chari notes that the philosophy contained in the Nalayira Divya Prabandham therefore marks an intersection of Vedic, Agamic, and Puranic traditions.

== Legacy ==
The bhakti literature that sprang from Alvars has contributed to the establishment and sustenance of a culture that deviated from the Vedic religion and rooted itself in devotion as the only path for salvation. In addition, they contributed to Tamil devotional verses independent of knowledge of Sanskrit. As a part of the legacy of the Alvars, five Vaishnavite philosophical traditions (sampradayas) developed over a period of time. These were the sampradayas founded by Ramanuja, Madhva, Vallabha, Nimbarka, and Chaitanya.

== Sources ==
=== Books ===
- Aiyangar, S. Krishnaswami (1911). Ancient India. London: Luzac & Co.
- Aiyangar, S. Krishnaswami (1920). Early History of Vaishnavism in South India. London: Oxford University Press.
- "Azhvaar". Encyclopædia Britannica Online. Encyclopædia Britannica Inc. 2014. Archived from the original on 7 January 2015.
- Bhandarkar, R. G. (1913). Vaisnavism Saivism And Minor Religious Systems.
- Chari, S. M. Srinivasa (1994). Philosophy and Theistic Mysticism of the Āḻvārs. Delhi: Motilal Banarsidass Publishers.
- de-Gaia, Susan, ed. (2019). Encyclopedia of Women in World Religions: Faith and Culture Across History. Santa Barbara, California; Denver, Colorado: ABC-CLIO. ISBN 9781440848506.
- Dubyanskiy, Alexander (2014). "A Medieval Tamil Poem on Bhakti: Tiruppāvai by Āṇṭāḷ". In Francis, Emmanuel; Schmid, Charlotte (eds.). The Archaeology of Bhakti I (PDF). Pondicherry Centre of the École française d’Extrême-Orient. Archived from the original on 7 January 2019.
- Flood, Gavin D. (13 July 1996). An Introduction to Hinduism. Cambridge University Press. ISBN 978-0-521-43878-0.
- Garg, Gaṅgā Rām (1992). Encyclopaedia of the Hindu World: Ak–Aq. Concept Publishing Company. ISBN 9788170223757.
- Govindacharya, Alkondavilli (1902). The Holy Lives of the Azhvars or The Dravida Saints. Mysore: G. T. A. Press.
- Jestice, Phyllis G. (2004). Holy People of the World: A Cross-Cultural Encyclopedia. Santa Barbara, California: ABC-CLIO. ISBN 9781576073551.
- Lochtefeld, James G. (2002). The Illustrated Encyclopedia of Hinduism: A–M (1 ed.). New York: Rosen. ISBN 9780823931798.
- Mittal, S. G. R.; Thursby, G. Richard (2006). Religions of South Asia: An Introduction. Routledge. ISBN 9780203970027.
- Mukherjee, Sujit (1999). A Dictionary of Indian Literature: Beginnings–1850, Volume 1. Orient Blackswan. ISBN 9788125014539.
- Narayanan, Vasudha (2007). "Tamil Nadu: Weaving Garlands in Tamil: The Poetry of the Alvars". In Bryant, Edwin F. (ed.). Krishna: A Sourcebook. New York: Oxford University Press.
- Palaniappan, S. (2004). "Āḻvār or Nāyaṉār: The Role of Sound Variation, Hypercorrection and Folk Etymology in Interpreting the Nature of Vaiṣṇava Saint-Poets". In Chevillard, Jean-Luc (ed.). South-Indian Horizons. Pondichéry: Institut Français de Pondichéry.
- Ramaswamy, Vijaya (2007). Historical Dictionary of the Tamils. Scarecrow Press. ISBN 9780810864450.
- Rao, P. V. L. Narasimha (2008). Kanchipuram – Land of Legends, Saints & Temples. New Delhi: Readworthy Publications (P) Ltd. ISBN 978-93-5018-104-1.
- Sujatha (2011). Azhvargal: Oru Eliya Arimugam (in Tamil). Thirumagal Nilayam Publish.

=== Theses / Dissertations ===
- Jagannathan, Bharati (2009). Approaching the Divine: Integrating Āḻvār Bhavkti in Śrīvaiṣṇavism: 6th-14th Centuries CE (PhD thesis). Jawaharlal Nehru University.
- K. K., Radha (2006). History of Vaiṣṇavism Under the Kulaśekharas (PhD thesis). University of Kerala.
- Padmanabhan, R. (1993). God perception of vedanta desika with particular reference to his Nayaki Bhava in comparison with Nammalvar and Tirumanki Alvar (PhD thesis). University of Mumbai.
- Rajagopalan, Vasudha (1978). The Śrī Vaiṣṇava Understanding of Bhakti and Prapatti: From the Āḻvārs to Vedānta Deśika (PhD thesis). University of Bombay.
- Sambaiah, O. (1988). Vaisnavism in Andhradesa AD 1000 to 1600: A Historical Study (PhD thesis). Acharya Nagarjuna University.
- Sundaram, R. (1993). George Herbert and Nammazhvar: A Comparative Study (PhD thesis). Pondicherry University.
- Varadharajan, K. (September 2018). Impact of Harinamasankirtan in Thiruvaimozhi in the Modern Era (PhD thesis). University of Madras.
- Varadachari, K.C. (1947). Alvars of South India. Tirupati: Bhavan's Book University.

=== Websites ===
- Nippard, Andrea (Spring 2009). "The Alvars" (PDF). Mahavidya.ca. Mahavidya. Archived from the original (PDF) on 3 December 2013.
- "Indian Literature Through the Ages". CCRT India. Government of India. Archived from the original on 15 May 2013.
- "About Alvars". Divyadesam Online. divyadesamonline.com. Archived from the original on 21 June 2007.

== See also ==
- Naalayira Divya Prabandham
- Bhakti movement
- Tamil mythology
- Nathamuni
