= Antati =

Style of verse in Tamil poetry

Antati (Tamil: அந்தாதி, romanized: Antāti) is a unique kind of Tamil poetry, constructed such that the last or ending word of each verse becomes the first word of the next verse.

In some instances, the last word of the series of verses becomes the beginning of the very first verse, thus making the poem "a true garland of verses". The term is a portmanteau, since in Tamil, anta(m) means "end", and ati means "beginning". The Shaiva saint Karaikal Ammaiyar was the first poet to compose an antati.

== Notable antatis ==
- Arpudha Tiruvantati by Karaikal Ammaiyar
- Mutal Tiruvantati by Poigai Alvar
- Irantam Tiruvantati by Bhoothath Alvar
- Munram Tiruvantati by Peyalvar
- Tiruvaymoli by Nammalvar
- Kanninun Cirutampu by Madurakavi Alvar
- Abirami Antati by Abirami Pattar
- Saraswati Antati by Kambar

== See also ==
- Anadiplosis
