= Poigai Alvar =

Hindu poet-saint

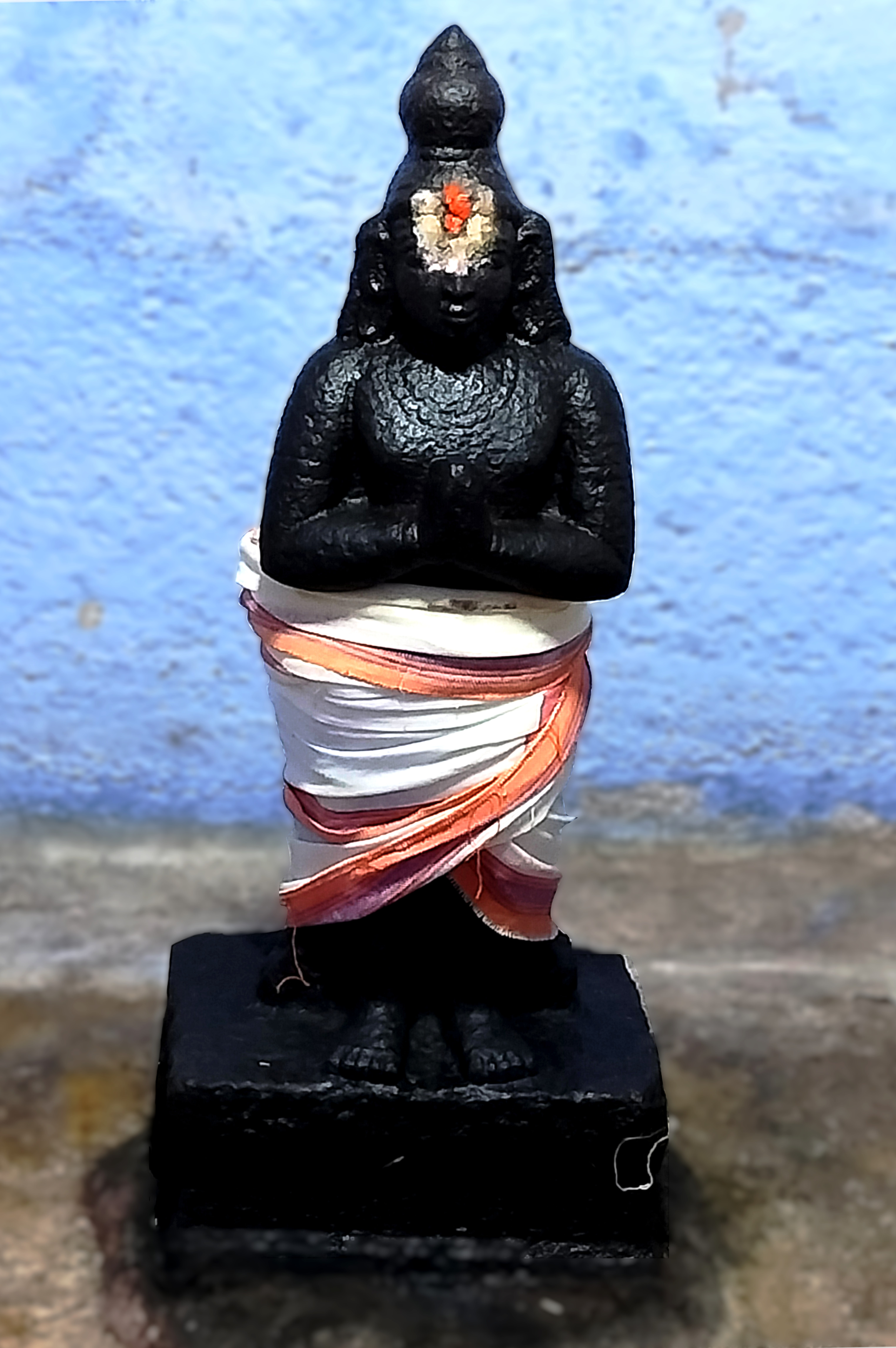
- Murti of Poigai Alvar, Sri Appan Venkatachalapati Temple, Cheranmahadevi

Personal life
- Born: 7th century CE, traditionally believed to be 4203 BCE Tiruvekkaa near Kanchipuram
- Notable work: Mutal Tiruvantati

Religious life
- Religion: Hinduism
- Philosophy: Vaishnavism; Bhakti

Poigai Alvar Tamil pronunciation was one of the twelve Alvar saints of South India, who are known for their affiliation to Vaishnava tradition of Hinduism. The verses of Alvars are compiled as Nalayira Divya Prabandham and the 108 temples revered are classified as Divya Desam. Poigai is one of the three principal Alvars, with the other two being Bhoothath Alvar and Peyalvar, collectively called Mutalamalvargal, who are regarded to be born out of divinity. Poigai composed hundred verses that are classified as Mutal Tiruvantati, and his composition is set in the antati style, in which the ending syllable is the starting one for the next verse.

According to traditional account, the first three Alvars belong to Dvapara Yuga (before 4200 BCE). As per Hindu legend, Poigai was found in a small pond near the Yadhotakaari temple at Tiruvekkaa. In Tamil, small pond is called poigai, and since he was found in a pond, he got the name Poigai.

As per legend, the three Alvars were once confined in a small dark enclosure during a rain in Thirukovilur and they experienced a fourth individual among them. They found out that it was god Vishnu and Poigai Alvar wished to see his face continuously but could view only from the simmering light of the lightning. With a view to maintain the continuity of light, he instantly composed hundred songs wishing light to emerge. The other two continued composing hundred songs each on Vishnu. The works of these earliest saints contributed to the philosophical and theological ideas of Vaishnavism. Along with the three Shaiva Nayanmars, they influenced the ruling Pallava kings of the South Indian region, resulting in changing the religious geography from Buddhism and Jainism to the two sects of Hinduism.

== Alvars ==
The word Alvar means the 'immersed', referring to the poet-saints's deep devotion to their supreme deity, Vishnu. The Alvars are considered the twelve supreme devotees of Vishnu in Sri Vaishnavism, who were instrumental in popularising Vaishnavism during the 5th to 8th centuries CE. The religious works of these saints in Tamil, songs of love and devotion, are compiled as Naalayira Divya Prabandham, containing 4000 verses, with each of the 108 temples revered in their songs is classified as a Divya Desam. The saints had different origins, and belonged to different classes. According to tradition, the first three Alvars, Poigai Alvar, Bhoothath Alvar, and Pei Alvar, were born miraculously. Thirumalisai Alvar was the son of a sage, Thondaradi Alvar, Mathurakavi Alvar, Periya Alvar, and Andal were from Brahmin varna, Kulasekhara Alvar from the Kshatriya varna, Nammalvar from a cultivator family, Tirupana Alvar from the Tamil Panar community, and Tirumangai Alvar from the Kalvar community.

Divya Suri Saritra by Garuda-Vahana Pandita (11th century CE), Guruparamparaprabavam by Pinbaragiya Perumal Jiyar, Periya tiru mudi adaivu by Anbillai Kandadiappan, Yatindra Pranava Prabavam by Pillai Lokacharya, commentaries on Divya Prabandam, Guru Parampara (lineage of Gurus) texts, temple records and inscriptions give a detailed account of the Alvars and their works. According to these texts, the saints were considered incarnations of some form of Vishnu. Poigai is considered an incarnation of Panchajanya (Krishna's conch), Bhoothath of Kaumodaki (Vishnu's mace), Pey of Nandaka (Vishnu's sword), Thirumalisai of Sudarshanam (Vishnu's discus), Namm of Vishvaksena (Vishnu's commander), Madhurakavi of Vainatheya (Vishnu's eagle, Garuda), Kulasekhara of Kaustubha (Vishnu's necklace), Periya of Garuda (Vishnu's eagle), Andal of Bhudevi (Vishnu's wife, Lakshmi, in her aspect as Bhudevi), Thondaradippodi of Vaijayanti/Vanamalai (Vishnu's garland), Thiruppaan of Srivatsa (An auspicious mark on Vishnu's chest) and Thirumangai of Sharanga (Rama's bow). The songs of Prabandam are regularly sung in several the Vishnu temples of South India daily and also during festivals.

According to traditional account by Manavala Mamunigal, the first three Alvars, namely, Poigai, Bhoothath and Pey belong to Dvapara Yuga (before 4200 BCE). It is widely accepted by tradition and historians that the trio are the earliest among the twelve Alvars. Along with the three Saiva nayanmars, they influenced the ruling Pallava kings, creating a Bhakti movement that resulted in changing the religious geography from Buddhism and Jainism to these two sects of Hinduism in the region. The Alvars were also instrumental in promoting the Bhagavata cult and the two epics of India, namely, Ramayana and Mahabharata. The Alvars were instrumental in spreading Vaishnavism throughout the region. The verses of the various Alvars were compiled by Nathamuni (824-924 CE), a 10th-century Vaishnava theologian, who called it the "Tamil Veda".

== Early life ==
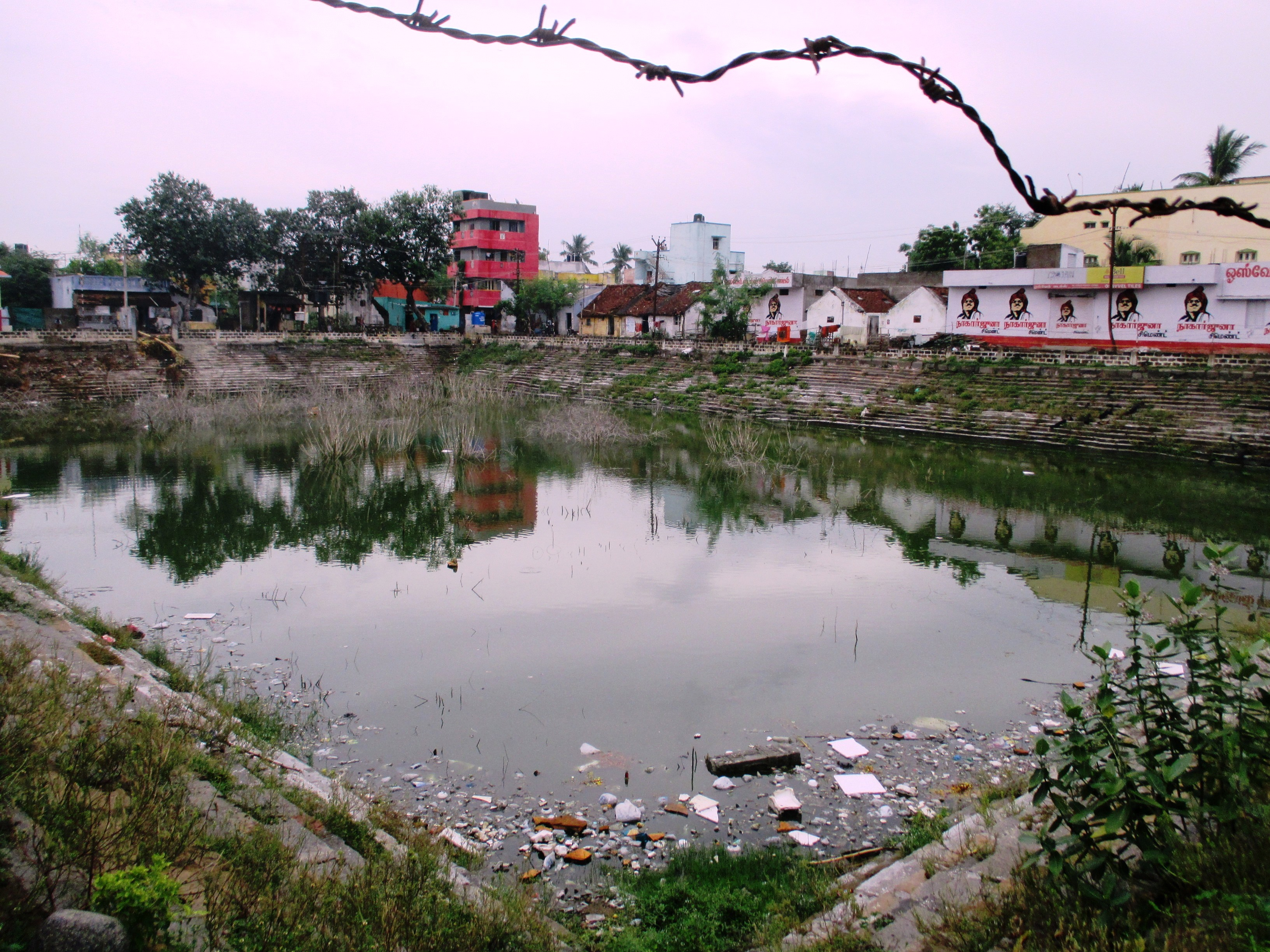
Temple tank in Yathothkari Perumal Temple where Poigai Alvar originated

Poigai was found in a small pond near the Yadhotakaari temple at Tiruvekkaa. In Tamil, a small pond is called a poigai, and since he was found in a pond, he got the name Poigai. At Kanchipuram there is a temple inside the Deva-sarovara lake. This temple enshrines an idol of Saroyogi in a recumbent posture with eyes closed in meditation. From childhood, Poigai was deeply devoted to Vishnu. He mastered all the Vaishnava speeches, and followed the Vaishnava tradition. He was variously known as Ayonigi, Saro-yogi, Kasara-yogi, Poigai-piraan, Saravora Munindra and Padma-muni.

Tamil

கைதை சேர் பூம்பொழில் சூழ் கச்சி நகர் வந்துதித்த
பொய்கைப் பிரான் கவிஞர் போரேறு - வையத்து
அடியவர்கள் வாழ அருந்தமிழ் நூற்றந்ததி
படிவிளங்கச் செய்தான் பரிந்து

Transliteration

kaidhai ser pumpoḻil suḻ kachi nagar vandhudhiththa
poygaip piran kavinjar poreru vaiyaththu
adiyavargal vaḻa arunthamiḻ nutrantati
padivilangkach seythan parindhu

Kanchi derives its name from Brahma, who is known as Ka; who worshipped God in this kshetram. In that famed city, in a lotus flower within a lotus pond, under the star Thiruvonam (Sravanam) which is the star of God Himself, Poigai was born. He gave the wonderful Mutal Tiruvantati pasuram, which is like a lamp that drives away the darkness of the mind and elevates the soul.

== Composition ==
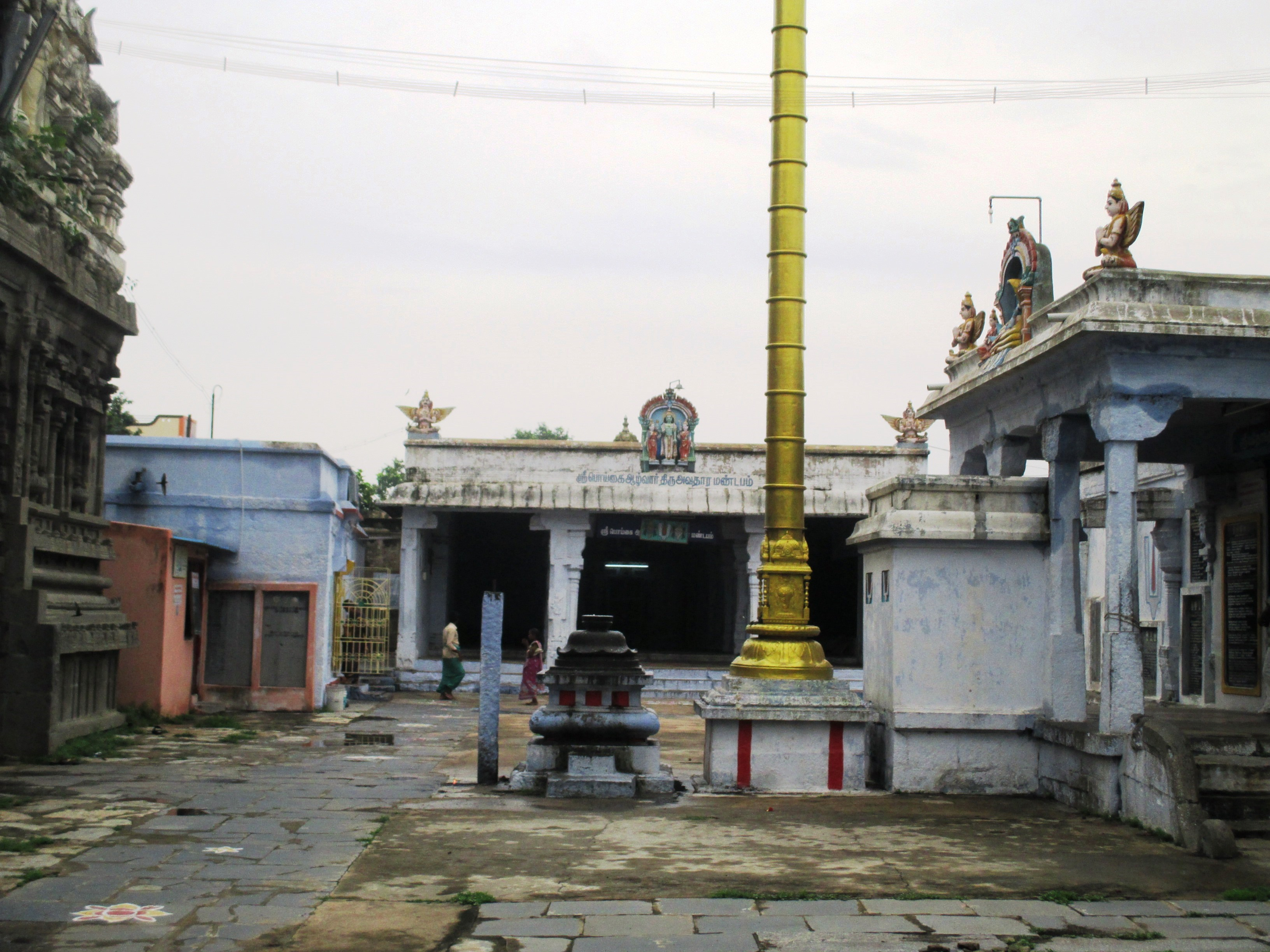
Shrine of Poigai Alvar in the temple

As per Hindu legend, Vishnu appeared to the Mutal Alvars (first three Alvars) at Thirukkoilur. It was day time, but it darkened and started raining heavily. The wandering Poigai Alvar found out a small hide out, which has a space for one person to lie down. Bhoothath Alvar arrived there looking for a hiding place and Poigai Alvar accommodated him, with both sitting together. In the meanwhile, Pei Alvar also came to the same place as all the three preferred to stand because of lack of space. The darkness became dense and inside the small room, they were not able to see each other. In the meanwhile, they felt a fourth person also forced his way among them. The three Alvars realised from the light of the lightning that the fourth one had a charming face that was sublime and divine. The trio could immediately realize that it was Vishnu who was huddling among them. Poigai Alvar wished to see Vishnu's face continuously, but could view only from the simmering light of the lightning. With a view to maintain the continuity of light, he instantly composed hundred songs wishing the earth to be a big pot full of ghee like an ocean where the sun could be the burning wick.

Tamil

வையம் தகளியா வார்கடலே நெய்யாக
வெய்ய கதிரோன் விளக்காக - செய்ய
சுடர் ஆழியான் அடிக்கே சுட்டினேன் சொல் மாலை
இடராழி நீங்குகவே என்று

Transliteration

vaiyam thagaliya varkadale neyyaga
veyya kadhiron vilakkaga seyya
sudar aḻiyan adikke suttinen sol malai
idarḻi ningkugave enru

Deeming in the world as bowl, the full sea as ghee, the fierce-rayed sun as a luminous wick, I have twined a garland of speech for the feet of Him who wields the red flaming discus so that there may be freedom from the ocean of misery.

The song is also interpreted as the Alvar praying to god to remove the darkness and ask for his unlimited knowledge and power. Bhoothath Alvar also sang 100 songs imagining to light the lamp constantly through ardent love for him. Peyalvar sang another 100 songs, where he described the enchanting charm of the divine face and the association of Narayana equipped with chakra and sankha, and his divine consort, the goddess Lakshmi.

Poigai composed hundred verses that are classified as the Mutal Tiruvantati. Poigai's composition was set in the antati style. The word anta means end, and adi means beginning. The antati style has ending word or the syllable of each verse as the beginning word of the succeeding verse and the last word of the hundredth verse becomes the beginning of the first verse, making the hundred verses a true garland of verses. The works of these earliest saints contributed to the philosophical and theological ideas of Vaishnavism. The verses of the trio speak of Narayana (another name for Vishnu) as the supreme deity and they refer frequently to Trivikrama and Krishna, the avatars of Vishnu.

== Worship ==
There is a shrine dedicated to Poigai in the Yathothkari Perumal Temple tank called Deva Sarovaram where his image is depicted in reclining posture. Poigai has revered Sri Ranganathaswamy Temple in one, Thirupaarkadal in one, Tirumala Venkateswara Temple in ten, Thiruvikrama Perumal Temple in two, Vaikuntha in two and Tiruvekkaa in four verses. Alvar Utsavam is a festival celebrated annually during the birth date of the saint based on Tamil calendar in the Yathothkariswami temple at Tiruvekka.

== Mangalasasanam ==
There are 20 of his pasurams in the Naalayira Divya Prabhandham. He has sung in praise of six temples.

S.No.	Name of the temple	Location	Photo	Number of Pasurams	Presiding deity	Notes/Beliefs
1	Srirangam.	Srirangam, Trichy district Tamil Nadu; 10.8625°N 78.689722°E		1	Ranganayagi; Ranganathar (Periya Perumal)	Srirangam temple is often listed as the largest functioning Hindu temple in the world, the still larger Angkor Wat being the largest existing temple. The temple occupies an area of 156 acres (631,000 m^{2}) with a perimeter of 4,116m (10,710 feet) making it the largest temple in India and one of the largest religious complexes in the world. The annual 21-day festival conducted during the Tamil month of Margaḻi (December–January) attracts 1 million visitors.
2	Tiruvekkaa.	12.824°N 79.712°E		4	Komalavalli; Yathothkari Perumal	Tiruvekkaa or Yathothkari Perumal temple is considered one of three oldest Vishnu temples in Kanchipuram. The temple is believed to have been built by the Pallavas of the late 8th century CE, with later contributions from Medieval Cholas and Vijayanagara kings. The temple has three inscriptions on its walls, two dating from the period of Kulothunga Chola I (1070–1120 CE) and one to that of Rajadhiraja Chola (1018-54 CE). The temple houses a rare image of Ranganatha recumbent on his left hand unlike other temples where he is recumbent on his right. Poigai Alvar was born at this temple lotus tank.
3	Thirukovilur.	11.966944°N 79.201944°E		2	Poongothai; Ulagalantha Perumal temple	Ulagalantha Perumal Temple is believed to have been built by the Medieval Cholas, with later contributions from Vijayanagar kings and Madurai Nayaks. The temple covers an area of 5 acres (20,000 m^{2}) and has a temple tower that is the third tallest in Tamil Nadu, measuring 192 ft (59 m) in height. As per Hindu legend, Vamana, a dwarf and an avatar of Vishnu, appeared here to quell the pride of Asura king Bali. The temple is believed to be the place where the first three Alvars, the Vaishnava saints, namely, Poigai Alvar, Bhoothathalvar and Peyalvar attained salvation. The temple is one of the Panchakanna (Krishnaranya) Kshetrams, the five holy temples associated with Krishna, an avatar of Vishnu.
4	Paramapadam	Heavenly	Vishnu, Lord of Vaikuntha	2	Lakshmi; Vishnu	Vaikuntha is the celestial abode of Vishnu who is one of the principal deities of Hinduism and the supreme being in its Vaishnavism tradition. Vaikuntha is an abode exclusive to him, his consort the goddess Lakshmi and other liberated souls that have gained moksha. They are blessed with pure bliss and happiness in the company of the supreme being for all eternity.
5	Tirupathi	13.143°N 79.907°E		10	Alamelumanga; Venkateswara	Venkateswara Temple is a landmark Vaishnava temple situated in the hill town of Tirumala at Tirupati in Chittoor district of Andhra Pradesh, India. The temple is dedicated to Lord Sri Venkateswara, an incarnation of Vishnu, who is believed to have appeared there to save mankind from trials and troubles of Kali Yuga. Hence the place has also got the name Kaliyuga Vaikuntham and Lord here is referred to as Kaliyuga Prathyaksha Daivam. The temple is also known by other names like Tirumala Temple, Tirupati Temple, Tirupati Balaji Temple. Lord Venkateswara is known by many other names: Balaji, Govinda, and Srinivasa. Tirumala Hills are part of Seshachalam Hills range. The hills are 853 metres (2,799 ft) above sea level. The Temple is constructed in Dravidian architecture and is believed to be constructed over a period of time starting from 300 CE. The Garbagriha (Sanctum Sanctorum) is called Ananda Nilayam. It is the richest temple in the world in terms of donations received and wealth. The temple is visited by about 50,000 to 100,000 pilgrims daily (30 to 40 million people annually on average), while on special occasions and festivals, like the annual Brahmotsavam, the number of pilgrims shoots up to 500,000, making it the most-visited holy place in the world.
6	Tirupparkadal	Heavenly	Kurma	1	Lakshmi; Vishnu	In Hindu cosmology, Tirupparkadal (The ocean of milk) is the fifth from the center of the seven oceans. It surrounds the continent known as Krauncha. According to Hindu mythology, the devas (gods) and the asuras (demons) worked together for a millennium to churn the ocean and release amrita, the nectar of immortal life. It is spoken of in the Samudra Manthana chapter of the Puranas, a body of ancient Hindu legends. It is also the place where Vishnu reclines over Shesha Naga, along with his consort, Lakshmi.
