= Panar =

Regions with significant populations
- • India • Pakistan

Languages
- • Gujarati • Hindi • Urdu

Religion
- Islam

The Panar are a Muslim community found in the state of Gujarat in India.
