= Vaikuntham =

- Neighborhood
- Country: India
- State: Tamil Nadu
- District: Salem

Area
  - Total: 5 km^{2} (1.9 sq mi)

Population
  - Total: 50,000
  - Density: 10,000/km^{2} (26,000/sq mi)

Languages
  - Official: Tamil
- Time zone: UTC+5:30 (IST)
- Postal code: 637103
- Vehicle registration: TN 27
- No Coastline: 0 kilometres (0 mi)

Vaikuntham is a neighborhood in Sankagiri taluk, Salem district, India. Vaikuntham is located near to Salem on NH 47 (Salem to Coimbatore). There is a Toll Plaza located near Vaikuntham.

== Facilities ==
Vaikuntham has a bank, school, telephone exchange, post office, Aavin milk booth, and Santhai (vegetable market) on every Tuesday where local farmers gather and sell their vegetables and goods.

== Temple ==
=== Selli Amman Temple ===
The Selli Amman (Sellandiyamman) Temple is a well known and famous temple around in this village. Every year in the month of November, four days festival at this temple is being conducted. All native villagers across the states in India gather with their family members and enjoy the festival. Typical folk dances, bull embracing, Oyilaattam, Giant wheel, etc will be present in the temple ground for peoples amusement.

== Church ==
Bethel Valley Church is an independent non-denominational, evangelical church established in Vaikuntham during the 1970s. Led by Senior Pastor Isaac, the church serves the local congregation and also conducts worship services in nearby Unjanai.

== Subneighborhood ==
=== Kaali Patti privu ===
Kaali Patti Privu is a sub village of Vaikuntham. Here is a hospital, village administrative office and EB office.

== Farmers weekly market ==
Every Tuesdays farmers conduct a one day market in vaikuntham where nearby people gather and purchase and sell the vegetables and goods.

== Transportation ==
Vaikuntham and Kali patti pirivu have 24-hour bus transportation. Every half an hour it has bus transportation to Salem, Sankgiri, Erode, Bavani.

== Educational institutions ==
Vaikuntham has a government higher secondary school and Amman matriculation school.

== Hospital ==
Nearby located is a government primary clinic; Muthusamy clinic.

== People and occupations ==
Occupations of villagers are mostly agriculture, rope making and textile.
