= Pusalar =

Hindu saint

Pusalar (also transliterated as Pūcalār, Pusala or Poosalar) is an eighth-century Nayanar saint, venerated in the Hindu sect of Shaivism. He is generally counted as the fifty-eighth in the list of 63 Nayanars. His hagiography speaks how he created a grand temple for Shiva in his mind and how his patron god Shiva preferred attending the consecration of his mind temple, instead of a grand temple created by a Pallava king.

== Life ==
The primary account of Pusalar's life comes from the Tamil Periya Puranam by Sekkizhar (12th century), which is a hagiography of the 63 Nayanars. Pusalar was a Brahmin, priest. He lived in Thiruninravur (Tiru Ninravur/ Ninravur), presently a neighbourhood in the city of Chennai. In Pusalar's times, Thiruninravur was part of Tondai Nadu (Thondai Mandalam), which is part of the Pallava kingdom. He was a poor temple priest.

Pusalar was a Shaiva, a devotee of the god Shiva. He wanted to create a grand temple for Shiva, but did not have the money to do so. Thus, Pusalar decided to build a temple to Shiva in his mind with his imagination. He followed the rituals of temple-building, sanctified the ground and lay the first stone of his mind temple on an auspicious day. Over course of time, he completed his mind temple and selected a holy day for the Kumbhabhishekam ceremony, when the temple is consecrated and the image of God installed in the garbhagriha (sanctum sanctorum).

The Pallava king Kadavarkon had just completed a grand Shiva temple in the capital Kanchipuram and selected the same day for consecration of his temple. Shiva appeared in the king's dream and instructed him to postpone the date of consecration as He would be journeying to Thiruninravur for the consecration of His devotee Pusalar's temple on the same day. The king postponed the date as per the divine decree and hastened to see the magnificent temple of Pusalar, which Shiva favoured over his own. However, on reaching Thiruninravur, the king could not find any stone temple visible in the town and was perplexed. He reached Pusalar's house and informed Pusalar about his dream. The saint revealed that the temple existed in his heart. The king was astonished by Pusalar's devotion and bowed down to him and worshipped him. Pusalar consecrated the temple on the ordained day and continued his worship until his death, when he is said to have attained Kailash, the abode of Shiva.

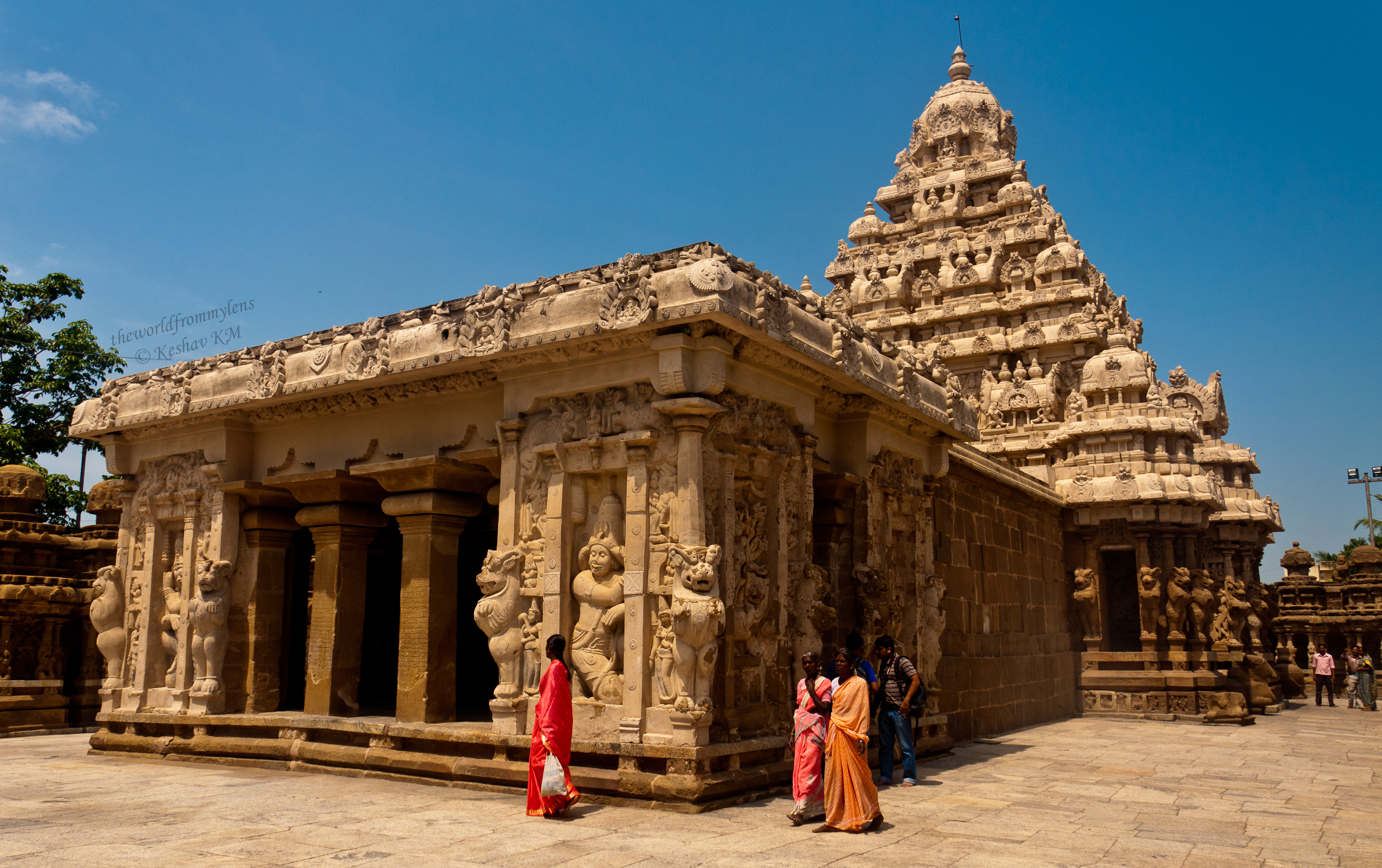
Inscriptions on the Kailasanathar Temple of Kanchipuram are used to date Pusalar to the eighth century.

Pusalar is regarded as a historical figure. The Pallava king Kadavarkon from the Periya Puranam account is identified as King Rajasimha (also known as Narasimhavarman II), who reigned between 700 and 728 CE. The king's temple is identified as the Kailasanathar temple, which is regarded as Rajasimha's greatest temple and functioned as the personal shrine of the king. An inscription with 12 Sanskrit verses on the exterior walls of Kailasanathar temple aid the identification. The seventh verse talks about a "heavenly voice without body" that Rajasimha heard. This voice is associated with Shiva's voice in the Pusalar tale. Thus, Pusalar can be beginning to the beginning of the eighth century and a contemporary of Sundarar. The Periya Puranam depends on these inscriptions at Kailasanathar temple for telling the tale of Pusalar.

The tale of Pusalar (called Pusala Nayanaru in the account) is also recalled in the 13th-century Telugu Basava Purana of Palkuriki Somanatha in brief and with some variation. The king is called Vikrama Choda (a Chola king who reigned between 1118–1135 CE), instead of the Pallava in the Tamil version. He created a grand temple of gold. Pusala Nayanaru created a similar temple in mind and gained the grace of Shiva.

== Remembrance ==
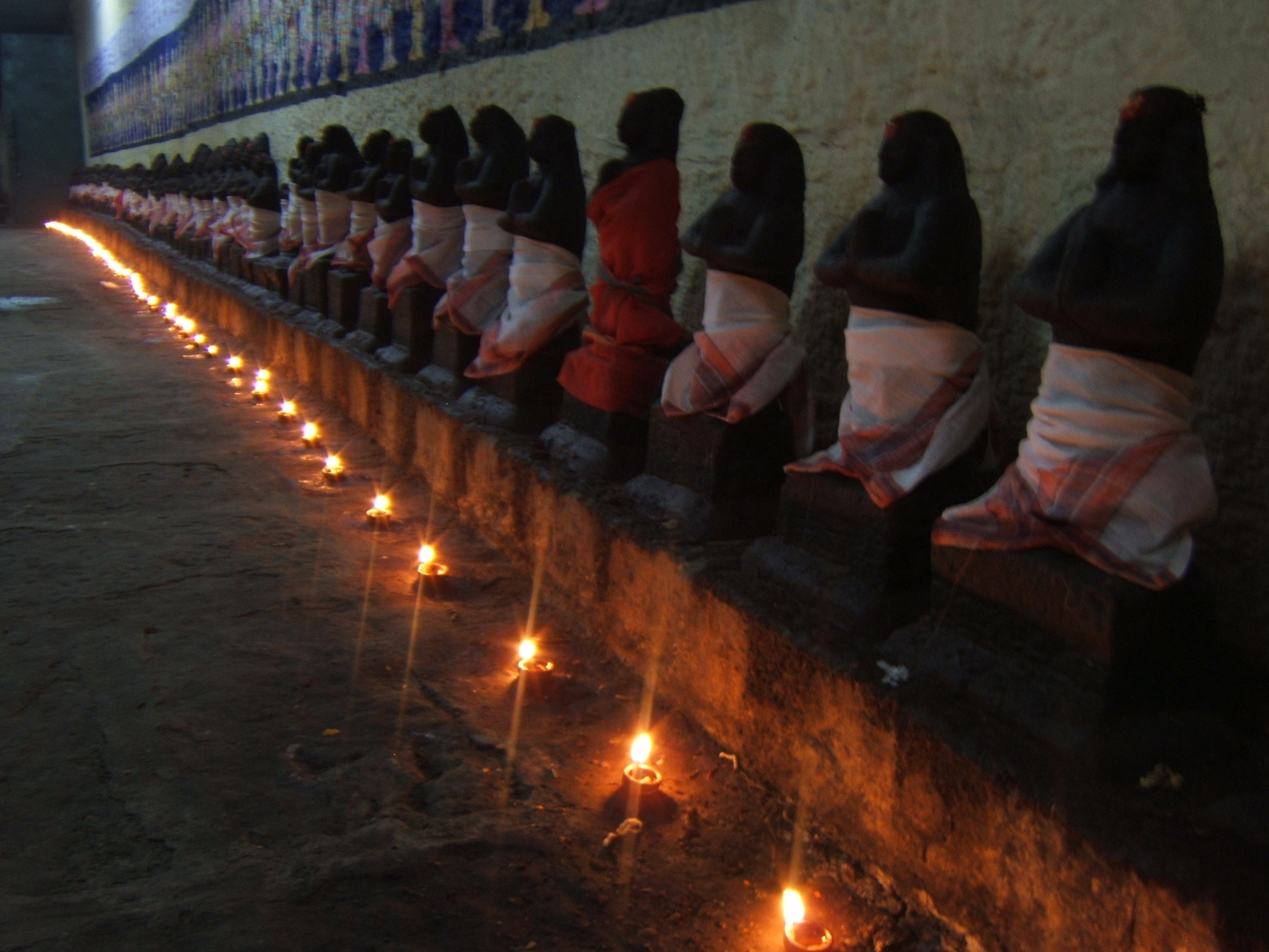
The images of the Nayanars are found in many Shiva temples in Tamil Nadu.

Pusalar is depicted with a shaven head and with folded hands (see Anjali mudra). A holy day in his honour is observed on the twenty-eighth day of the Tamil month of Aippasi, generally coincides with 13 November. He receives collective worship as part of the 63 Nayanars. Their icons and brief accounts of his deeds are found in many Shiva temples in Tamil Nadu. Their images are taken out in procession in festivals.

Hridayaleeswarar Temple, which dedicated to Shiva as Hrudayaleeswarar ("Lord in Devotees’ heart"), was built in Thiruninravur by the Pallavas in honour of Pusalar. Pusalar is worshipped with Shiva in the sanctum sanatorium of the temple. As per temple lore, this temple was created by the Pallava king from Pusalar's tale to fulfill Pusalar's wish to build a grand temple for Shiva. Since Pusalar originally built the temple in his heart, patients of heart diseases as well as cardiologists worship at this temple for cure of heart diseases.
