= Veppampattu =

Town in Tiruvallur district, Tamil Nadu, India

- Town
- Location in Tamil Nadu, India
- Coordinates: 13.124834°N 79.997152°E
- Country: India
- State: Tamil Nadu
- District: Tiruvallur
- Metro: Chennai City

Population
  - Total: 85,907

Languages
  - Official: Tamil
- Time zone: UTC+5:30 (IST)
- PIN: 602024
- Vehicle registration: TN 12 (Poonamallee RTO)
- City: Chennai
- Lok Sabha constituency: Tiruvallur
- Vidhan Sabha constituency: Poonamallee

Veppampattu is a town and one of the fastest developing suburban areas in Chennai City. It is Western part of the suburbs of the Metropolitan city Chennai in the Indian state of Tamil Nadu between Chennai and Arakkonam on the Chennai - Arakkonam railway line. It is fast-growing with a number of schools and colleges. Electric trains and NH 716 and MTH Road provide transportation to Chennai. Veppampatu can be approached by both train and bus. Bus stop is a very nearby railway station. Veppampattu comes under Chennai Metropolitan Area.

Veppampattu can be approached by Lucas-Thiruvallur High Road or Poonamalle High Road next to Thiruninravur. Educational institutions and engineering colleges contribute to the development of Veppampattu.

The neighbourhood is served by the Veppampattu railway station of the Chennai Suburban Railway Network. The next railway station is Thirunindravur. On 1 January 2025, Tamil Nadu government has announced its decision to upgrade Veppampattu from Village Panchayat to Municipality.

Constricting the bridges around veppampattu for safety and reduce risk of people who crossing railway level cross ( more than 50 deaths)which causing death.it's expecting to finish before 2028 around veppampattu which is connecting various roads and new high way which is raising from putlur ( thirupathi - chennai highway)

== Demographics ==
As of 2011 India census, Veppampattu had a population of 20,456. Males constitute 50% of the population and females 50%. Veppampattu has an average literacy rate of 72%, higher than the national average, male literacy is 79%, and female literacy is 65%.

== Banks ==
Veppampattu has banks with the following.

Bank Name	Public/Private	MICR Code	IFSC Code	ATM Centre
Indian Overseas Bank	Public	Waiting	IOBA0002772	Yes
Indian Bank	Public	600019236	IDIB000V111	Yes
City Union Bank	Private	607054204	CIUB0000062	Yes

== Highways ==
Veppampattu is well-connected by road and rail. National Highroad 716 connects Chennai and Anantpur in Andhra Pradesh. It is also projected to connect Surat in Gujarat and will be named the Chennai Surat Expressway.

Near by Its having Chennai Outer Ring Road within 10km Distance

And Proposed Chennai Pheripheral Ring Road Within 7 km Distance

== MTC Services connecting Veppampattu ==
Route number	Start	End	Via
M54V	Poonamallee	Veppampattu Rly.St	Nenmam, Thirumazhisai
54V	T Nagar	Veppampattu Rly.St	Saidapet, Guindy, Porur, Iyyappanthangal, Poonamallee
572	Tiruvallur	Avadi	Veppampattu, Tiruninravur, Pattabiram,
77V	Veppampattu Eswaran Nagar	C.M.B.T	Tiruninravur, Pattabiram, Avadi, Ambattur, Amb Est

== Trains ==
Normal EMU trains bound to Thiruvallur, Kadambathur, Thiruvalangadu, Arakkonam Junction and Tiruttani starting from Chennai Central and Chennai Beach Velachery halt at Veppampattu.

=== Fast Local Trains ===
Timing	Start	End	Via
7.24am	Arakkonam	Chennai Central	Veppampattu
7.54am	Arakkonam	Chennai Central	Veppampattu
8.29am	Thiruvallur	Chennai Central	Veppampattu
8.40am	Thiruvannamalai	Tambaram	Veppampattu
9.34am	Thiruvallur	Chennai Central	Veppampattu
6.57Pm	Chennai Central	Arakkonam	Veppampattu

== Education institutions ==
=== Colleges ===
- Sriram Engineering College.
- Sriram Polytechnic college.
- Bhajarang Engineering College.

=== Schools ===
- Velammal Vidhyalaya CBSE
- Sriram Vidya mandir matriculation school.
- Sriram Vidya mandir (CBSE) School.
- Sri Aravindar Matriculation School.
- Raja National Matriculation Higher Secondary School.
- Carmel Public School.
- Sri Gnana Banu Vidyalaya Matriculation School.
- Government Higher Secondary School.
- Sri Gomathi Vidyala.
- Sri Mahalakashmi Vidyalaya Metriculation School.

== Marriage Halls & Party Halls ==
- Kalaimamani Durai Thirumana Maaligai
- Sumangali Mahal
- Sri Venkatachalapathy Palace
- GK Mahal
- Padmavathi Ramadoss Thirumana Mandabam
- Govindha Rajulu Thirumana Mandabam
- Sri Venkateswara Thirumana Maligai
- MKN Palace
- APG Party Hall
- CNV Mahal
- DKC Mahal
- SS Mahal
- DJ Party Hall
- BSN Mini Hall

== Nearby town ==
- Perumalpattu, a village about 2 km from Veppampattu in South bound, is known for lush green scenery and comparatively untouched flora.
- Sevvapet Village, is about 2 km from Veppampattu in West bound, the population of the village increased highly in the last decade due to migration from other nearby villages as a result of the Housing Boarding scheme and it has oldest Government High School.
- Natural and Rural Environment: The town retains a rural charm with agricultural fields and open spaces, which is a contrast to the urban sprawl of Chennai. This makes it an attractive option for people who prefer a quieter, more relaxed environment.
- Proximity to City: Veppampattu location within the Chennai Metropolitan Region makes it an ideal place for people who work in the city but want to avoid the high cost of living. The nearby Chennai Bypass Road and other arterial roads also enhance its connectivity.
