= Putlur (disambiguation) =

Putlur may refer to:

- Putlur (Anantapur district), a village in Anantapur district, Andhra Pradesh, India
- Putlur (Tiruvallur district), a village in Tiruvallur district, Tamil Nadu, India
