= Kaivandur =

Coordinates: 13°09′N 79°51′E

Kaivandur is a village in Tiruvallur district, Tamil Nadu, India. It is located between the town of Thiruvallur and the Thiruthani temple.
