= VEU (disambiguation) =

VEU (Video Entertainment Unlimited) was an American subscription television service.

VEU may also refer to:

- VEU Feldkirch, an Austrian ice hockey team
- Veppampattu railway station (Southern Railways code)
- Sileno Tamole "Veu", a king of Sigave
