= Sevvapet Road railway station =

Railway station in Tamil Nadu, India

Sevvapet Road Sevvaipettai Salai

General information
- Location: Thiruvallur district, Tamil Nadu, India
- Coordinates: 13.125028°N 79.966079°E
- System: Indian Railways and Chennai Suburban Railway station
- Owner: Ministry of Railways, Indian Railways
- Lines: West, West North and West South lines of Chennai Suburban Railway
- Platforms: 3
- Tracks: 4

Construction
- Structure type: Standard on-ground station
- Parking: Available

Other information
- Station code: SVR
- Fare zone: Southern Railways

History
- Electrified: 29 November 1979
- Former names: South Indian Railway

Passengers
- 6000/ day

Services
Preceding station	Chennai Suburban	Following station
Putlur towards Arakkonam Junction	West Line	Veppampattu towards Chennai Central MMC
Route map
Chennai Central MMC — Jolarpet
Location

Sevvapet Road railway station is one of railway stations of Chennai Central–Arakkonam section of the Chennai Suburban Railway Network. It serves the neighbourhoods of Sevvapet, Thiruvur, and Thozhuvur and is located 35 km (22 mi) west of Chennai Central. It has an elevation of 38 m (125 ft) above sea level.

== History ==
The first lines in the station were electrified on 29 November 1979, with the electrification of the Chennai Central–Tiruvallur section. An agriculture research centre was located near railway station.

== Neighbourhoods ==
The station has two villages on either side of the railway track. The village on the Southern side of the station is named Tiruvur, and the one on the other side is Thozhuvur, with chiefly agricultural fields.

== The station ==
=== Platforms ===
There are a total of 4 platforms and 4 tracks. The platforms are connected by foot overbridge. These platforms are built to accumulate 24 coaches express train.

=== Station layout ===
G	North Entrance Street level	Exit/Entrance & ticket counter
P	FOB, Side platform | P4 – Express Lines
P	Platform 4	Towards → MGR Chennai Central
P	Platform 3	Towards ← Arakkonam Junction / Jolarpettai Junction
P	FOB, Island platform | P2 Doors will open on the left | P3 – Express Lines
P	Platform 2	Towards → Chennai Central MMC next station is Veppampattu
P	Platform 1	Towards ← Arakkonam Junction next station is Putlur
P	FOB, Side platform | P1 Doors will open on the left
G	South Entrance Street level	Exit/Entrance & ticket counter

== See also ==
- Chennai Suburban Railway
