= Tiruvallur railway station =

Railway station in Tamil Nadu, India

Tiruvallur
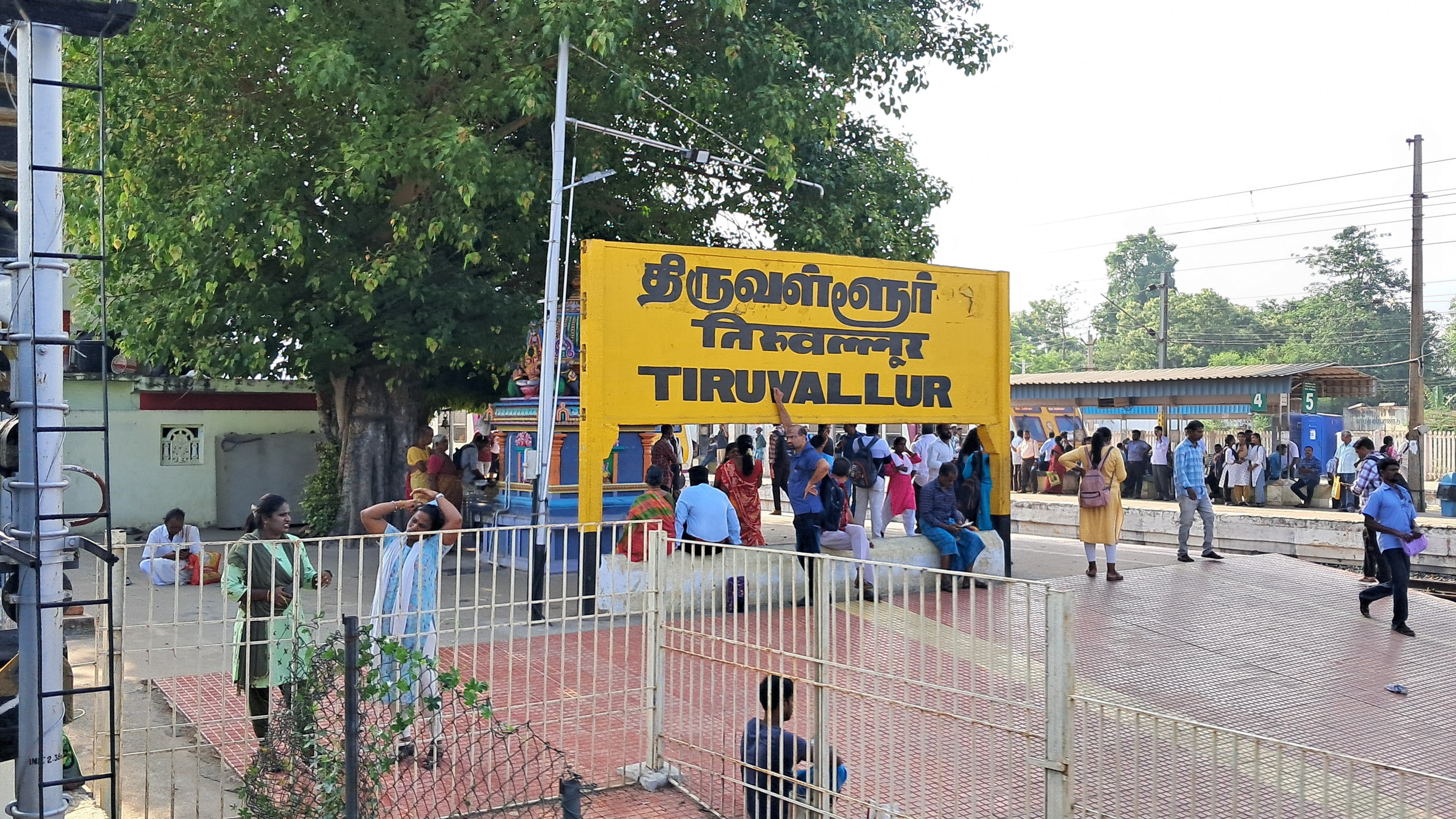

General information
- Location: Tiruvallur, Tamil Nadu, India
- Coordinates: 13°6′59″N 79°54′52″E
- System: Indian Railways and Chennai Suburban Railway station
- Owner: Ministry of Railways, Indian Railways
- Lines: West, West North and West South lines of Chennai Suburban Railway; Mumbai–Chennai line
- Platforms: 6
- Tracks: 6

Construction
- Structure type: Standard on-ground station
- Parking: Available

Other information
- Station code: TRL
- Fare zone: Southern Railways

History
- Opened: 1 July 1856; 170 years ago
- Electrified: 29 November 1979
- Former names: South Indian Railway

Passengers
- 2018: 100,000 (per day)

Services
Preceding station	Indian Railways	Following station
Arakkonam Junction towards Jolarpettai Junction or Bangalore City	Chennai Central–Bangalore City line	Perambur towards Chennai Central
Preceding station	Chennai Suburban	Following station
Egattur towards Arakkonam Junction	West Line	Putlur towards Chennai Central MMC
Route map
Chennai Central MMC — Jolarpet
Location

Tiruvallur railway station (station code: TRL) is an NSG–2 category Indian railway station in Chennai railway division of Southern Railway zone. It is one of the railway stations of the Chennai Central–Arakkonam section of the Chennai Suburban Railway Network. It is one of the terminal and oldest stations in the network where some of the suburban trains originate and terminate. It serves the neighbourhood of Tiruvallur, a suburb of Chennai, and is located 41 km west of the Chennai Central railway station. It has an elevation of 47.46 m above sea level.

== History ==
The lines at the station were electrified on 29 November 1979, with the electrification of the Chennai Central–Tiruvallur section.

== The station ==
=== Platforms ===
There are a total of 6 platforms and 6 tracks. The platforms are connected by foot overbridge. These platforms are built to accumulate 24 coaches express train.

=== Station layout ===
G	North Entrance Street level	Exit/Entrance & ticket counter
P	FOB, Side platform | P1 – Express Lines
P	Platform 1	Towards → MGR Chennai Central
P	Platform 2	Towards ← Arakkonam Junction / Jolarpettai Junction
P	FOB, Island platform | P2 – Express Lines | P3 Doors will open on the left
P	Platform 3	Towards → Chennai Central MMC next station is Putlur
P	Platform 4	Towards ← Arakkonam Junction next station is Egattur Halt
P	FOB, Island platform | P4 & P5 Doors will open on the left
P	Platform 5	Towards → Chennai Central MMC next station is Putlur
P	Platform 6	Towards → Chennai Central MMC next station is Putlur
P	FOB, Side platform | P6 Doors will open on the left
G	South Entrance Street level	Exit/Entrance & ticket counter

== Traffic ==
As of 2018, the station handles about 100,000 passengers a day.

== Projects and development ==
It is one of the 73 stations in Tamil Nadu to be named for upgradation under Amrit Bharat Station Scheme of Indian Railways.

== See also ==
- Chennai Suburban Railway
