= Veppampattu railway station =

Railway station in Tamil Nadu, India

Veppampattu

General information
- Location: Veppampattu, Chennai, Tiruvallur district, Tamil Nadu, India
- Coordinates: 13°7′31″N 79°59′52″E
- System: Indian Railways and Chennai Suburban Railway station
- Owner: Ministry of Railways, Indian Railways
- Lines: West, West North and West South lines of Chennai Suburban Railway
- Platforms: 3
- Tracks: 4

Construction
- Structure type: Standard on-ground station
- Parking: Available

Other information
- Station code: VEU
- Fare zone: Southern Railways

History
- Electrified: 29 November 1979
- Former names: South Indian Railway

Passengers
- 10,000/day

Services
Preceding station	Chennai Suburban	Following station
Sevvapet Road towards Arakkonam Junction	West Line	Thiruninravur towards Chennai Central MMC
Route map
Chennai Central MMC — Jolarpet
Location

Veppampattu railway station is one of the railway stations of the Chennai Central–Arakkonam section of the Chennai Suburban Railway Network. It serves the neighbourhood of Veppampattu, a suburb of Chennai located 32 km west of Chennai Central. It has an elevation of 39 m above sea level. Veppampattu is one of the fastest developing suburban areas in Chennai.

== History ==
The first lines in the station were electrified on 29 November 1979, with the electrification of the Chennai Central–Tiruvallur section.

== The station ==
=== Platforms ===
There are a total of 3 platforms and 4 tracks. The platforms are connected by foot overbridge. These platforms are built to accumulate 24 coaches express train.

=== Station layout ===
P	Side platform | P4 – Express Lines
P	Platform 4	Towards → MGR Chennai Central
P	Platform 3	Towards ← Arakkonam Junction / Jolarpettai Junction
P	Island platform | P2 Doors will open on the left | P3 – Express Lines
P	Platform 2	Towards → Chennai Central MMC next station is Thiruninravur
P	Platform 1	Towards ← Arakkonam Junction next station is Sevvapet Road
P	Side platform | P1 Doors will open on the left
G	South Entrance Street level	Exit/Entrance & ticket counter

== See also ==
- Chennai Suburban Railway
