= Hridayaleeswarar Temple =

Hirudhayaleeshwarar Temple
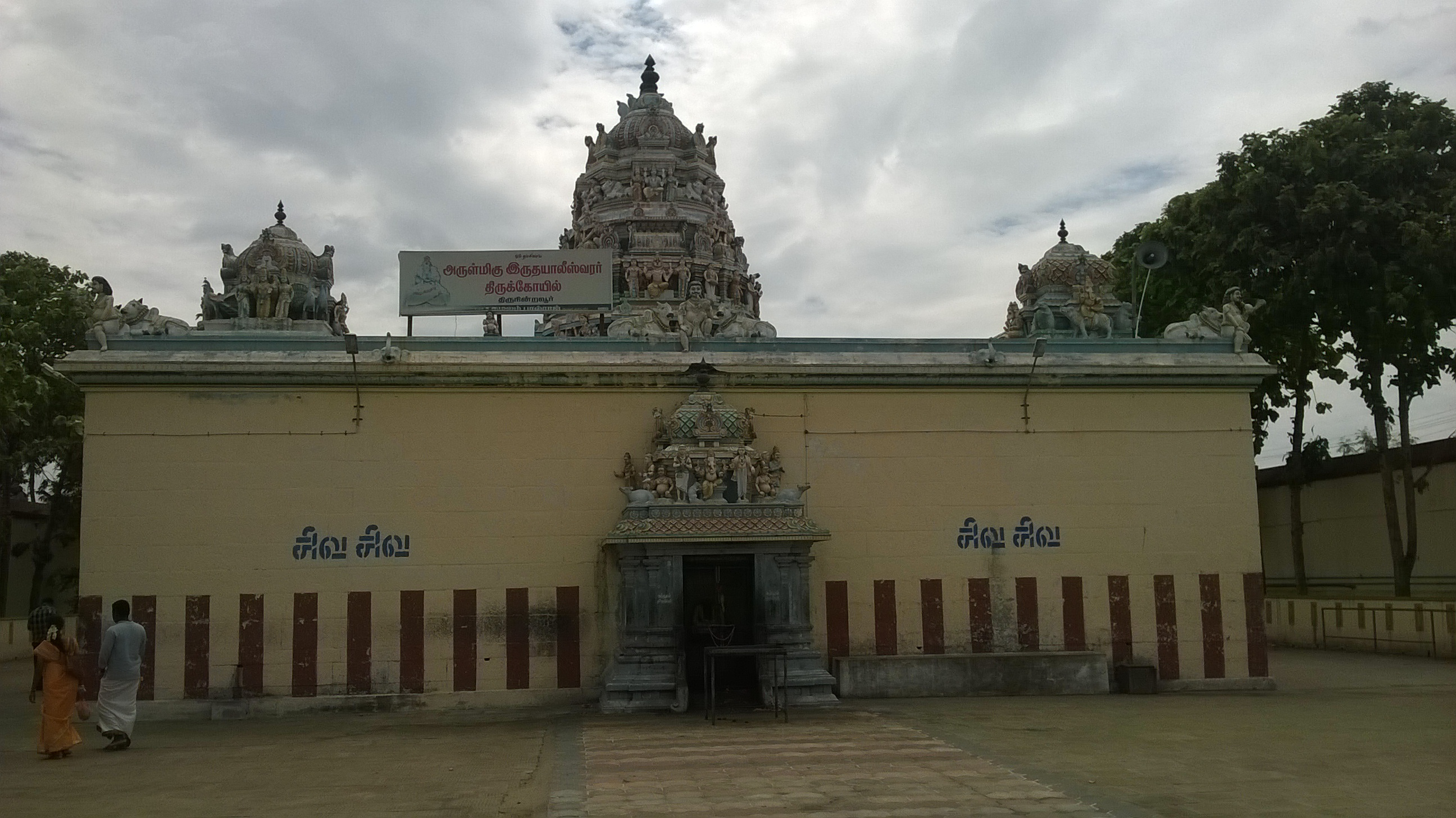

Religion
- Affiliation: Hinduism
- Deity: Irudhayaleeswarar (sivan)

Location
- Location: Thirunindravur, Chennai
- State: Tamil Nadu
- Country: India
- Interactive map of Hirudhayaleeshwarar Temple
- Coordinates: 13°06′42″N 80°01′41″E

Architecture
- Type: Dravidian architecture
- Creator: Pallavas
- Completed: 6th Century AD

Sri Hirudhayaleeswarar Sivan temple is a Hindu temple at Thirunindravur, Chennai, India.
