= Putlur Angala Parameshwari Amman Temple =

Hindu temple dedicated to Parvati in Putlur, Tamil Nadu, India

- Putlur Amman Temple புட்லூர் அங்காள பரமேசுவரியம்மன் கோவில்
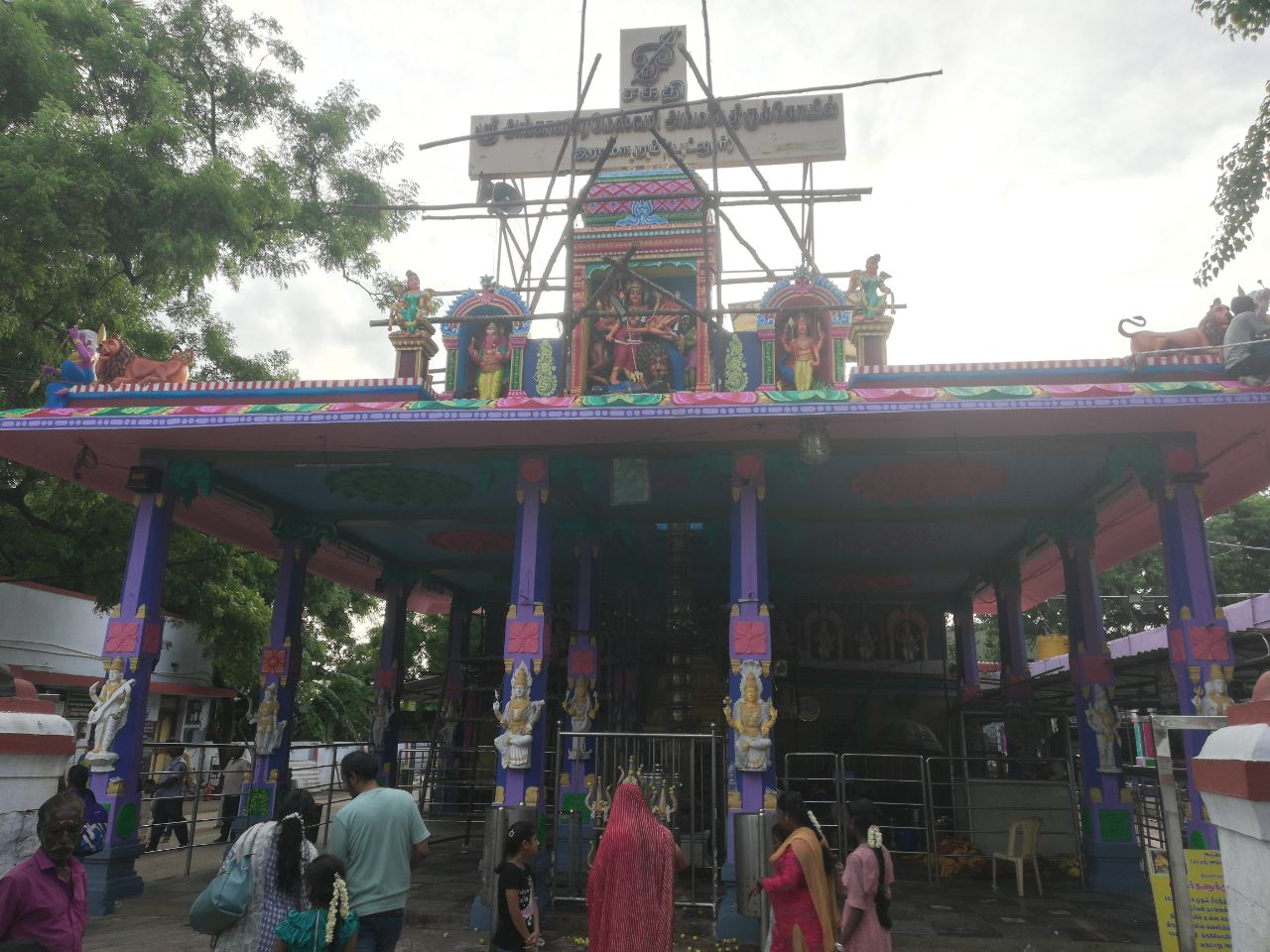
- Main entrance of the Putlur Amman Temple

- Location in Tamil Nadu

Religion
- Affiliation: Hinduism
- District: Tiruvallur
- Deity: Poongavanathu Amman (Parvathi)

Location
- Location: Putlur, Chennai, Tiruvallur district, Tamil Nadu, India
- State: Tamil Nadu
- Country: India
- Coordinates: 13.117891°N 79.939049°E

Architecture
- Type: Hindu temple architecture

Putlur Angala Parameshwari Amman Temple, also known as the Putlur Amman Temple, is a Hindu temple in Putlur, a village located within the Chennai Metropolitan Area, India. The temple is dedicated to the Hindu god Angala Parameshwari, an incarnation of Parvati, who is believed to have taken the form of a large anthill resembling a pregnant woman.

== Location ==
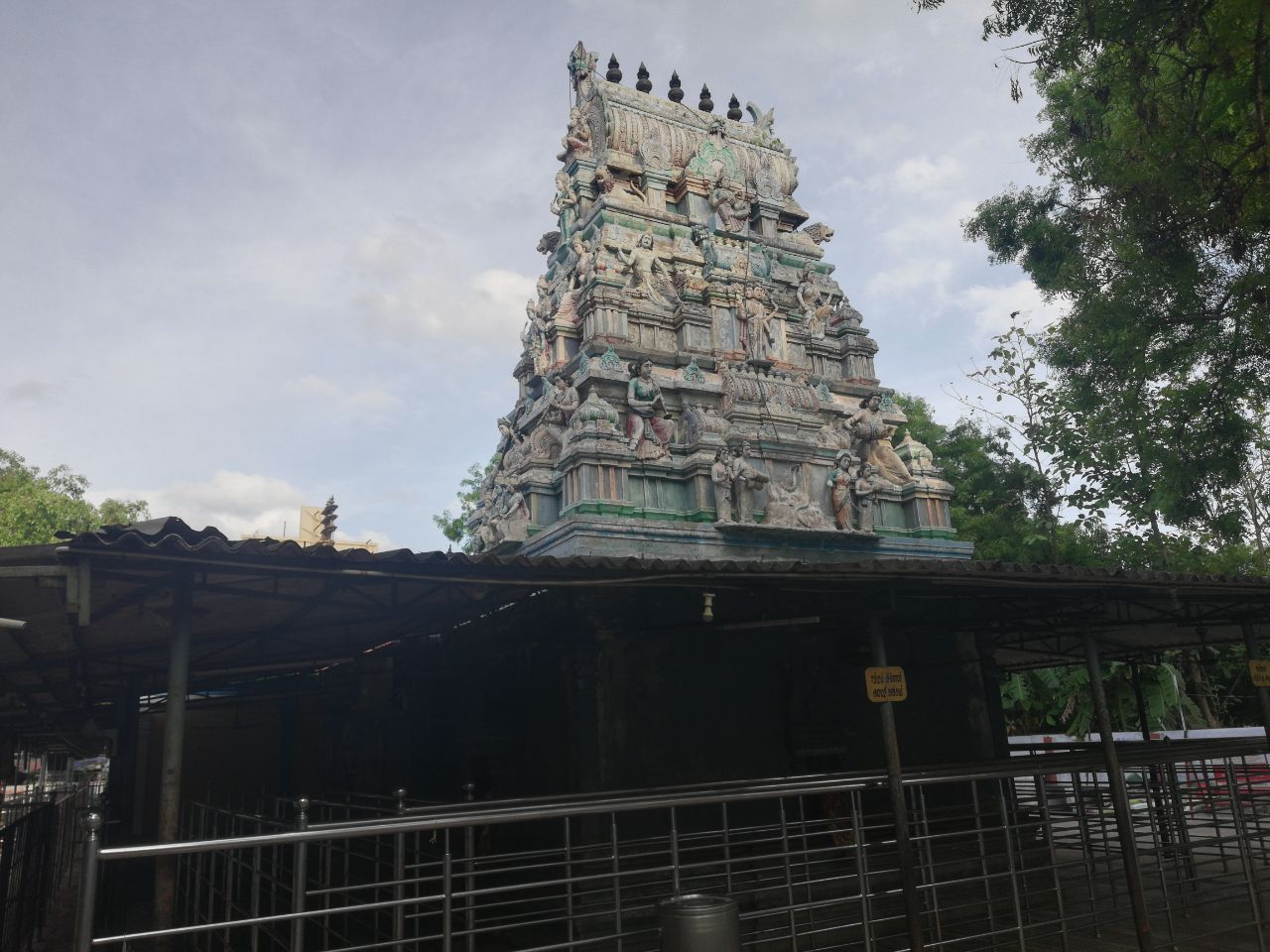
Vimanam at the temple

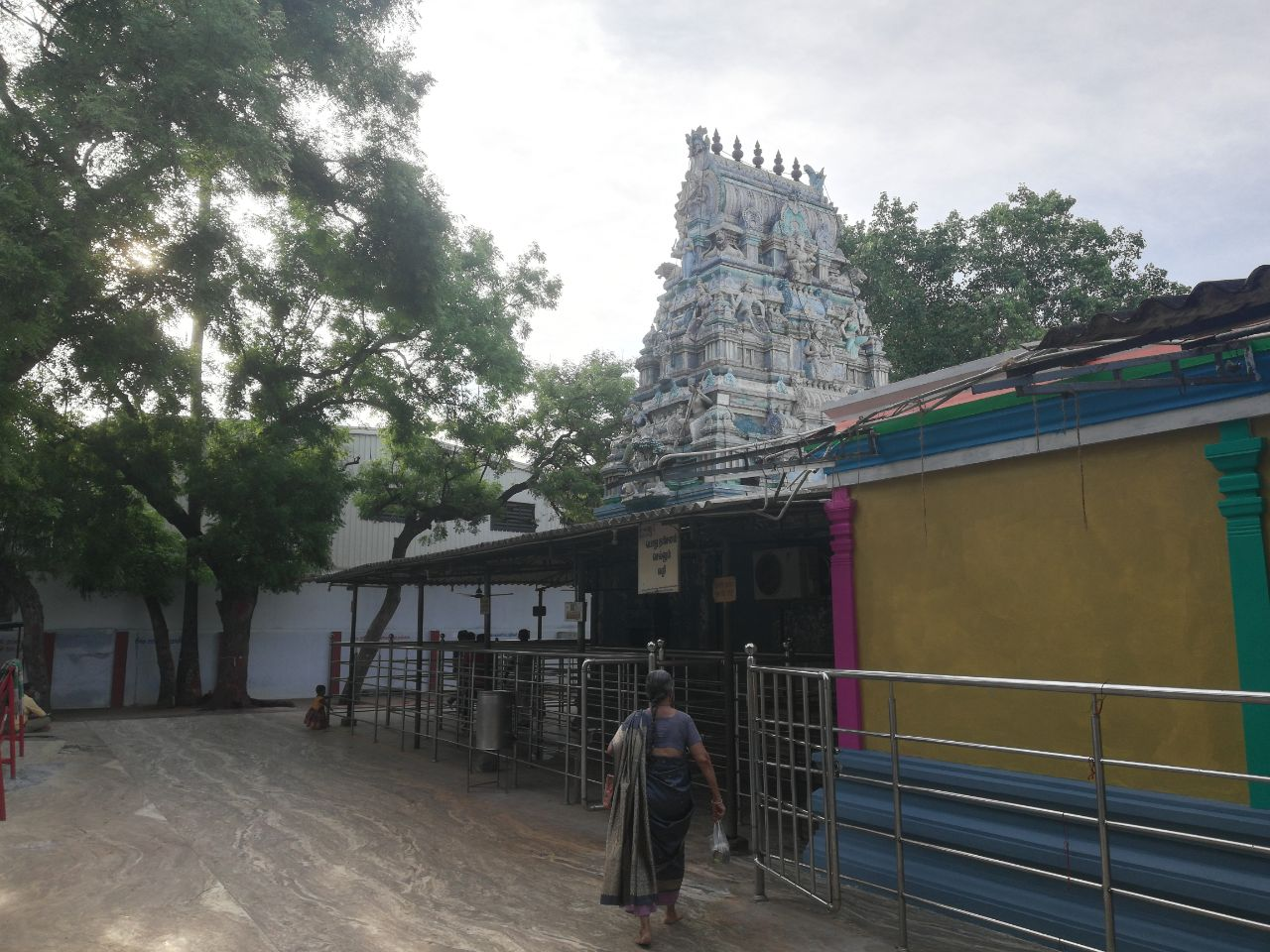
Outer corridor of the temple

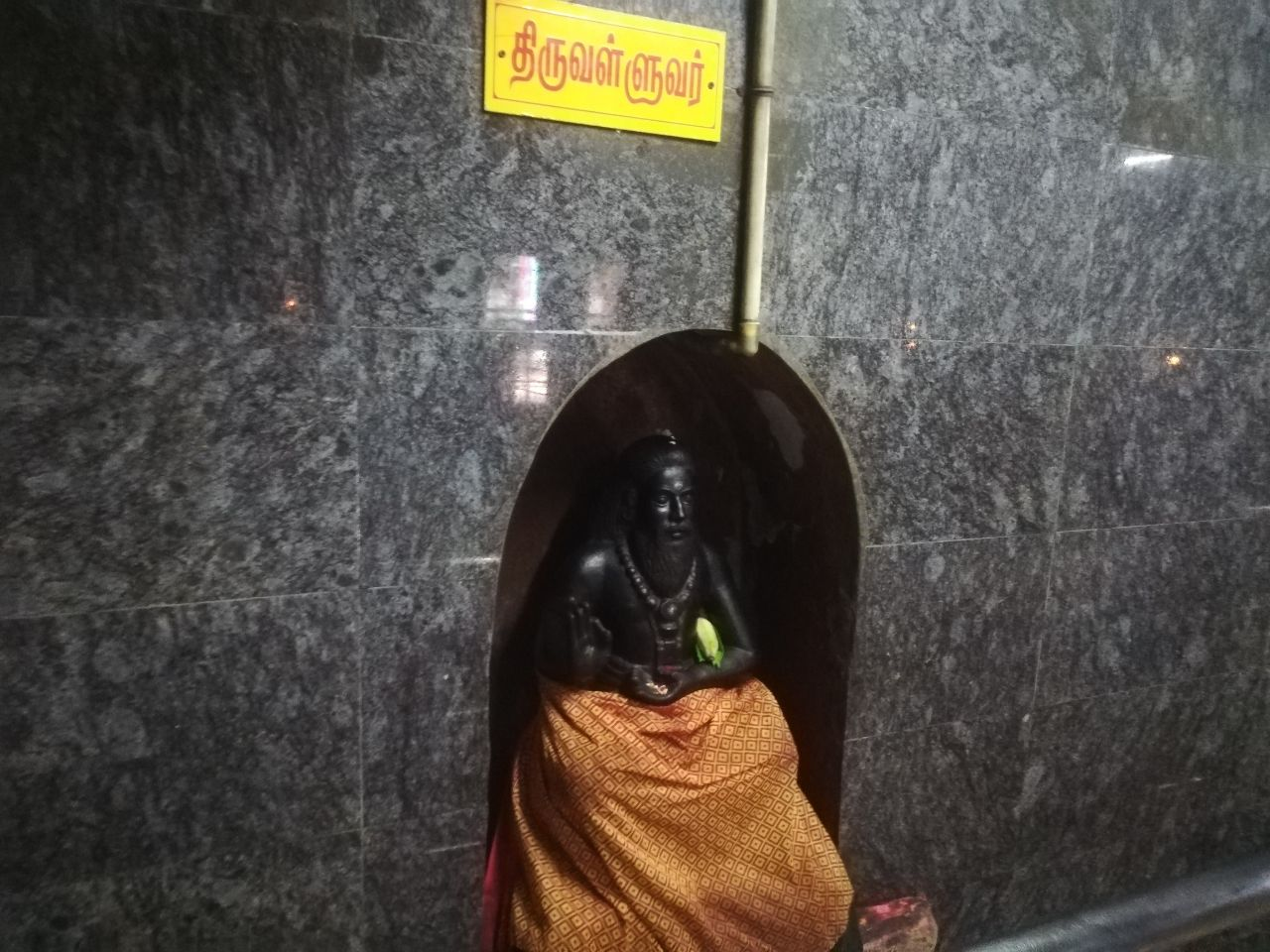
Valluvar idol near the sanctum

The temple is located in Ramapuram locality of Putlur, a village in Tiruvallur district of Tamil Nadu, around 38 km west of Chennai. The temple is 850 meters away from the Putlur railway station.

== The temple ==
The main deity at the temple is known as Poongavanathu Amman (literally "Goddess of the garden"). The goddess appears in the form of a natural anthill resembling a woman suffering from labour pain, lying with her mouth open. Owing to the presence of Shiva inside the sanctum sanctorum, the idol of Nandi is present in front of the sanctum instead of a lion found normally in a Devi temple, which is considered a rarity. There are shrines to Ganesh, Nataraja, Madurai Veeran, Subrahmanya, Dakshinamurti and the philosopher-saint Valluvar near the sanctum sanctorum. Nataraja is known by the name Thandavarayan. The sacred tree of the temple is a neem tree located in the outer corridor. Other shrines at the outer corridor include a sacred anthill and shrines of goddess Karumari, Ganesh, and Nagadevas (serpent deities) under the sacred tree. Devotees believe that worshiping the goddess fulfills their wish for a child.

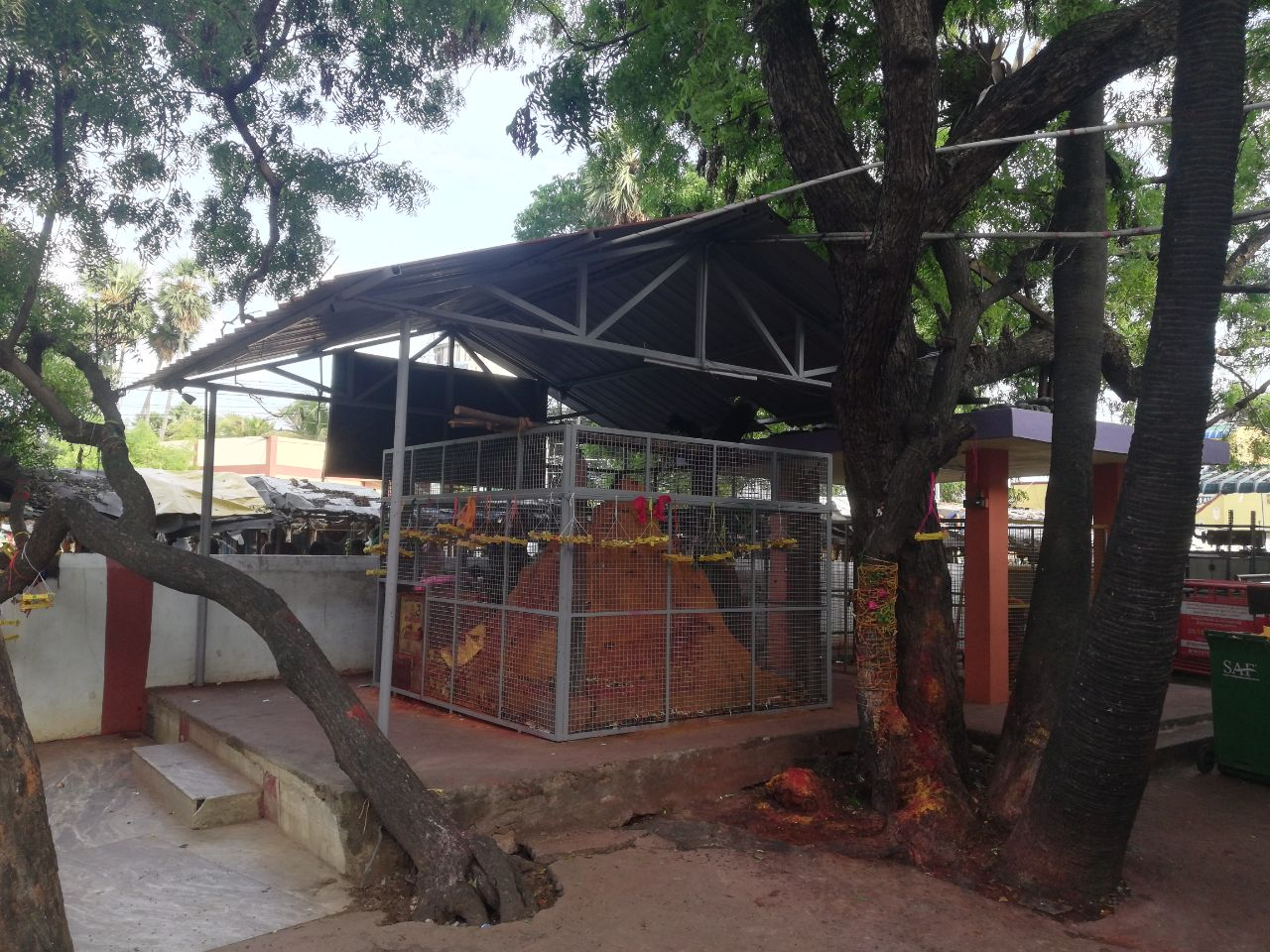
Anthill shrine at the temple premises

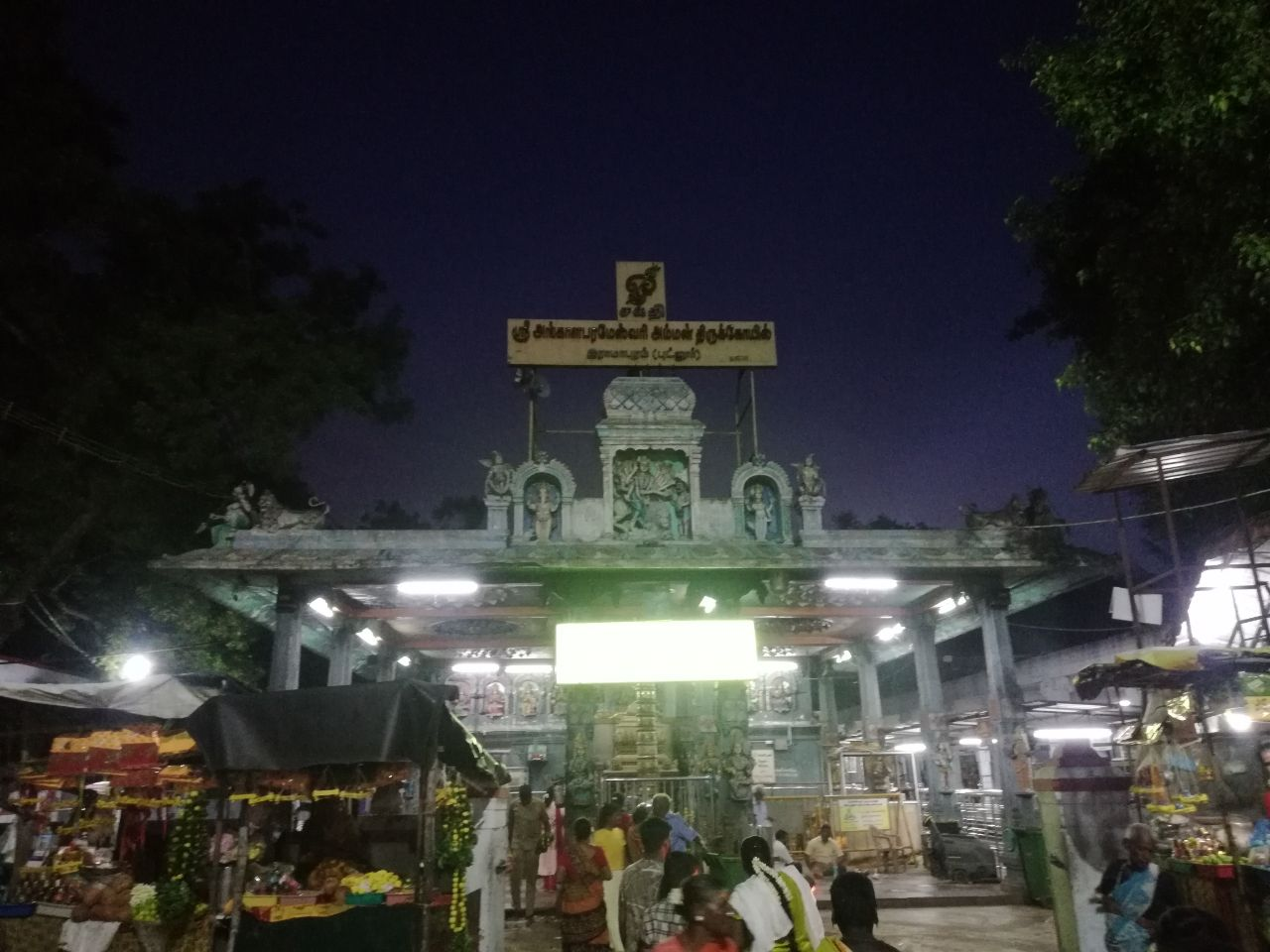
Night view of the temple's main entrance

Important festivals include Shivarathri, Masi Magam, the Fridays in the Tamil month of Aadi, and new moon days.

The temple had given rise to the name of the village "Putlur" meaning "the town of anthill" (from the Tamil term putru meaning "snake hole").

== See also ==
- Religion in Chennai
