= Veeraraghava Swamy Temple =

Perumal temple in Tiruvallur district, Tamil Nadu, India

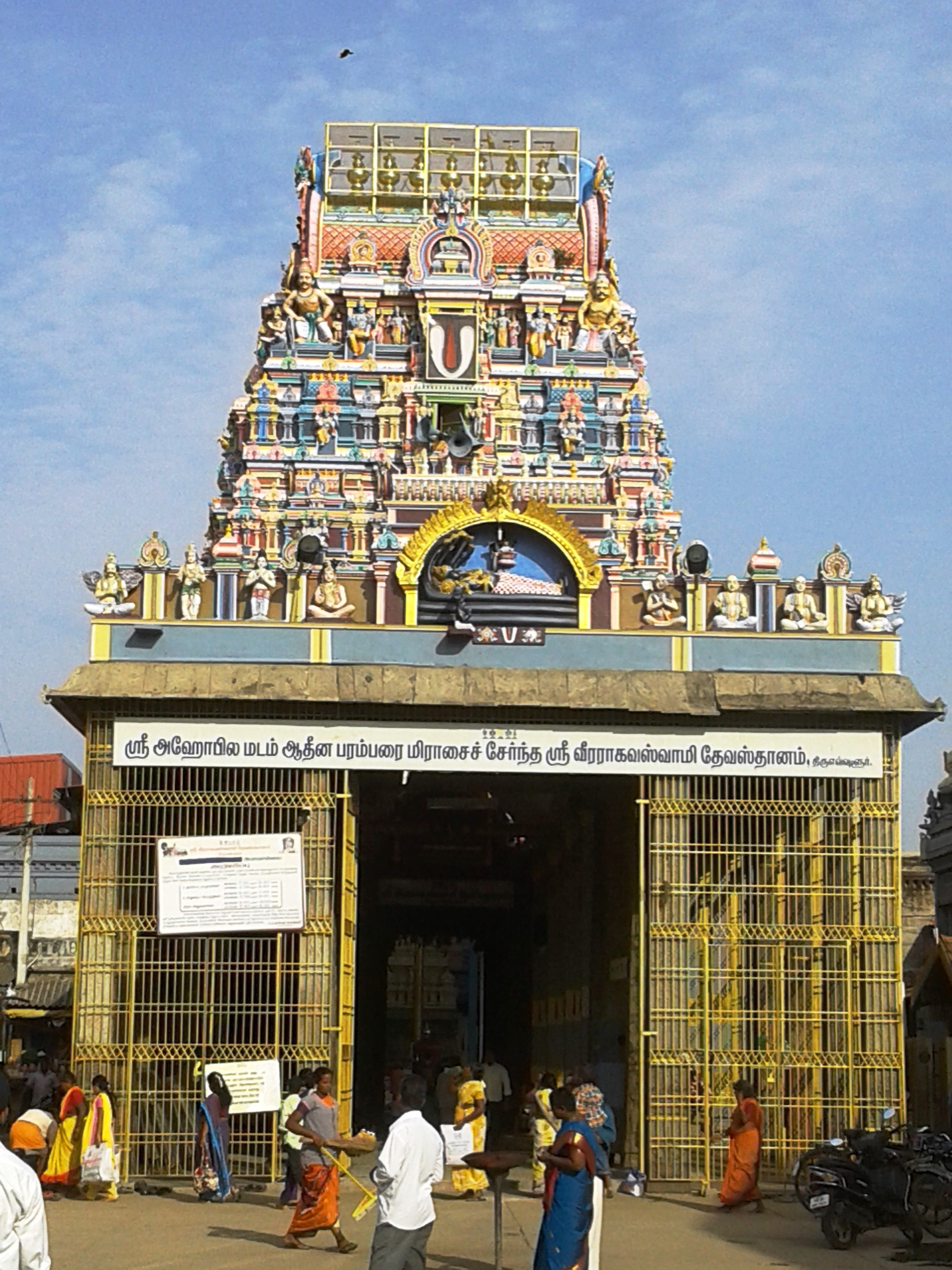

- Veeraraghava Swamy Temple, Tiruvallur, Tamil Nadu

Religion
- Affiliation: Hinduism
- District: Tiruvallur
- Deity: Sri Veeraraghava Swami (Vaidhya Veera Raghava Swami) (Vishnu) Kanakavalli Thayar (Vasumathi)
- Festivals: Vaikunta Ekadasi, Ammavasai
- Features: Tower: Vijayakoti Vimanam; Temple tank: Hritayathabhanasini Pushkarni

Location
- Location: Tiruvallur
- State: Tamil Nadu
- Country: India
- Coordinates: 13°08′35.8″N 79°54′24.2″E

Architecture
- Type: Dravidian architecture
- Creator: Pallavas, Cholas, Thanjavur Nayaks
- Elevation: 67.47 m (221 ft)

Website
- http://svdtiruvallur.org

Veeraraghava Swamy Temple (or Veeraraghavaswamy Temple) is a temple dedicated to the Hindu god Vishnu, located in Tiruvallur, Chennai Metropolitan City, an area and headquarters in Tiruvallur district in the South Indian state of Tamil Nadu. Constructed in the Tamil style of architecture, the temple is glorified in the Divya Prabandham, the early medieval Tamil canon of the Alvar saints from the 6th–9th centuries CE. It is counted as one among the 108 Divya Desams dedicated to Vishnu. Vishnu is worshipped as Veeraraghava Perumal, and his consort Lakshmi as Kanakavalli Thayar.

The temple is believed to be of significant antiquity and is believed to be initiated by the Pallavas of the late 8th century CE, with later contributions at different times from Thanjavur Nayaks. The temple has three inscriptions dating from the Chola period. The temple has a seven-tiered rajagopuram (gateway tower) and enshrined within a granite wall. The complex contains all the shrines and Hritayathabhanasini, the temple tank, is located to the west of the temple. A Goshala (cow shed) is maintained by the temple administration.

Veeraraghava Perumal is believed to have appeared to marry his consort Lakshmi in the place. The temple observes six daily rituals and three yearly festivals. The chariot festival and float festival, celebrated during the Tamil month of Chittirai (March–April), is the most prominent festival of the temple. The jeeyars of Sri Ahobila Matha are the hereditary trustees. The temple is maintained and administered by the Ahobila Matha.

== Legend ==
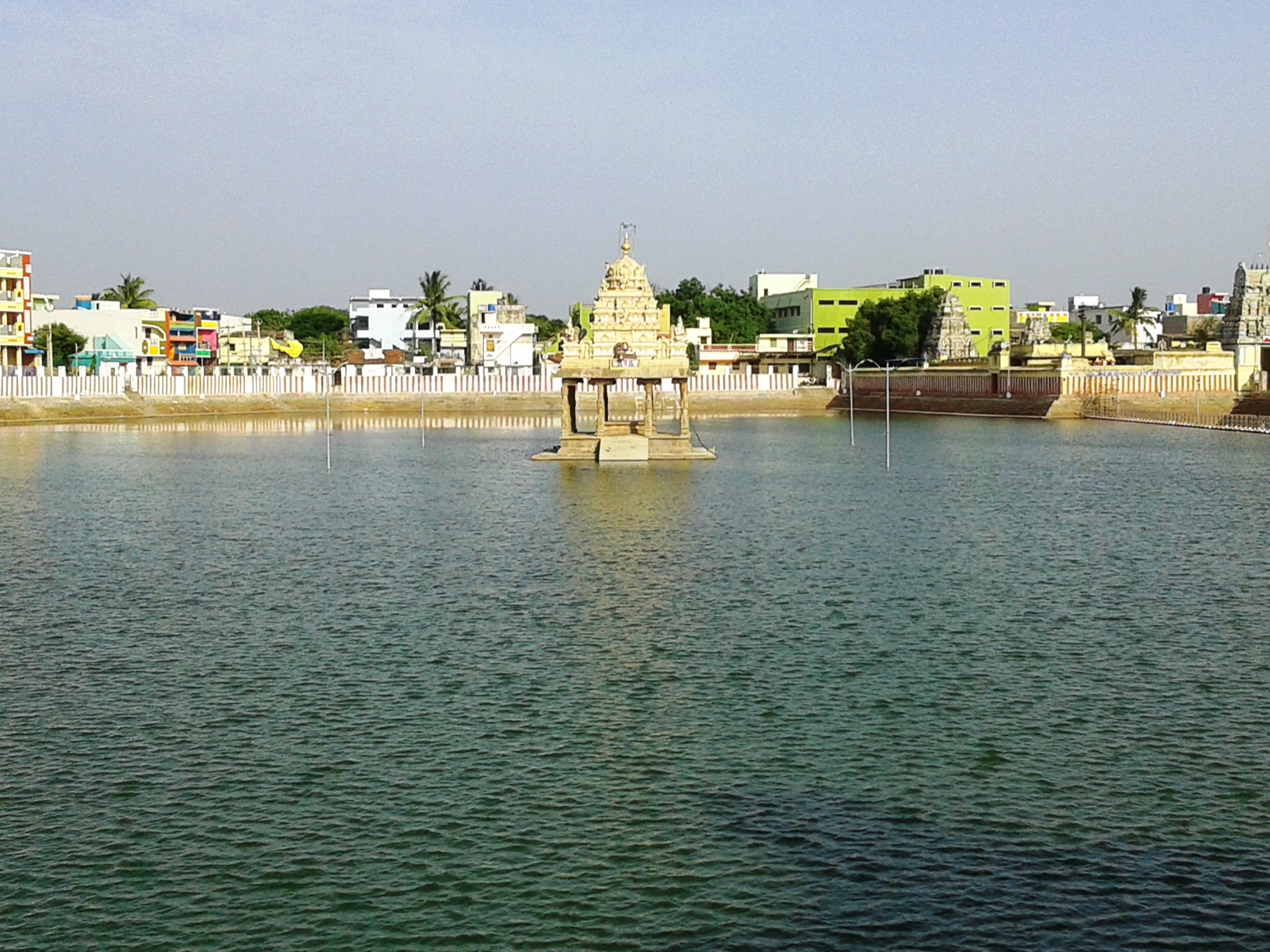
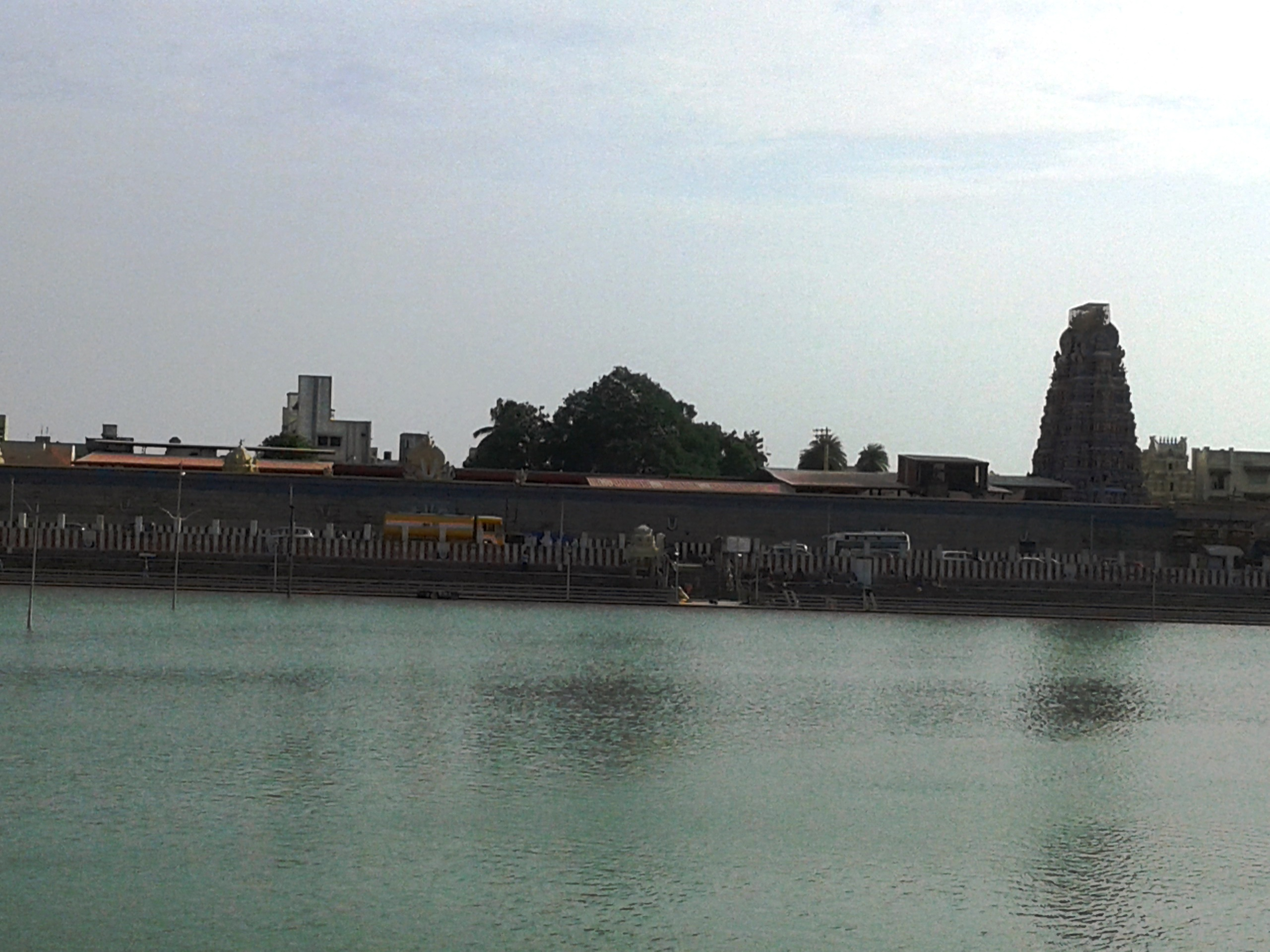
Temple tank

Markandeya Purana details the history of the temple. A sage named Salihotra had his hermitage in this place. He used to grind rice for a living and offered half of the flour to the seekers and used to consume the rest himself. He was an ardent devotee of Vishnu. To test his devotion, Vishnu appeared as a guest to him one day. He requested Salihotra to offer him food, which the sage did. The guest felt hungry and requested the sage to offer more food. The sage offered the other half portion of the flour which he used to consume himself. The guest asked a place to rest and the sage readily offered his hermitage. On arriving at the hermitage, the guest revealed his true form and blessed the sage.

As per another legend, Vishnu appeared in the place to marry Lakshmi, who was born as the daughter of Dilipa, the king of Dharmasenapura. He appeared in the place and married her. The place is also called Thiruevvul and Veeksharanyam.

As per yet another legend, Shiva was not invited by Daksha, the father of Dakshyani and wife of Siva for a big yagna (sacrifice). Siva, in his anger, opened his third eye out of which Virabhadra was created. He was directed by Siva to kill Daksha and he followed his orders. Siva incurred Brahmahatti Dosham on account of the execution. He was directed to the sacred tank of the temple to propitiate himself off the sins. The shrine of Siva in the form of Theertheswarar on the northern banks of the temple is believed to be place where Siva cleansed himself.

== History ==
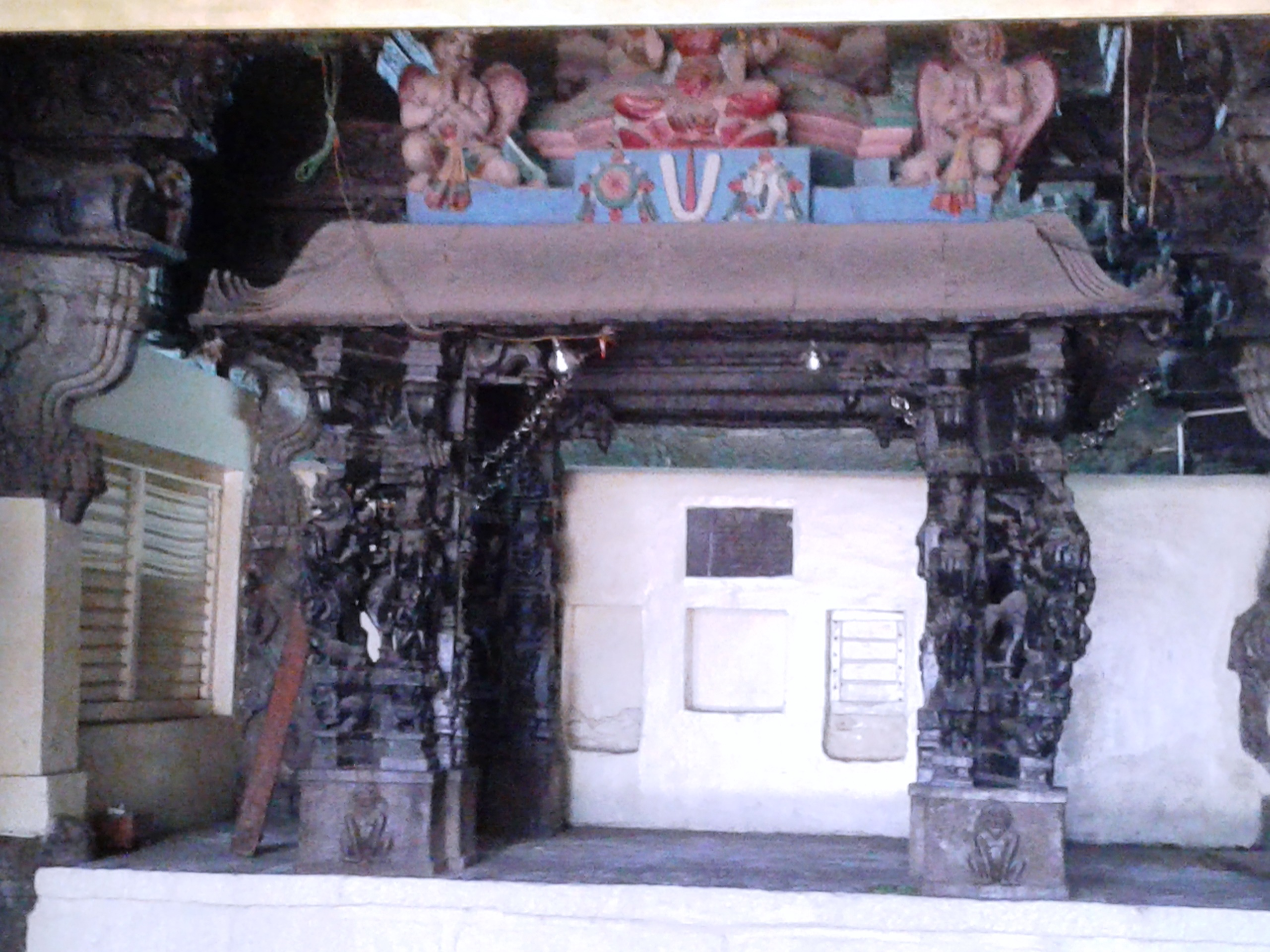
The Vellikizhamai Mandapam, made of blackstone

The temple is originally believed to have been built by the Pallavas during the 8th century. There are inscriptions dating back to the later half of the 9th century Pallava dynasty reign here. Local folklore claims that the temple is around 5000 years old. According to historian K.V. Soundararajan, the Rangantha temples in South India built during the 9th and 10th centuries have a systematic arrangement of subsidiary deities as seen in this temple along with the Appakkudathaan Perumal Temple at Koviladi, Sowmya Narayana Perumal temple at Thirukoshtiyur, Rajagopalaswamy temple at Mannargudi and Rangantha temple at Srirangapatna. There are inscriptions in the temple from the period of Kulothunga Chola I (1070-1122 CE) indicating gift of 1000 kulis of land by Tiruvenkatadeva to the temple. The inscriptions from the eastern wall of the Vahanamandap indicates gift of 130 pons of gold by Veera Raghava Sadagoppa Jiyar, the thirteenth seer of Ahobila Matha to the temple during 1630-75. There are inscriptions indicating gift of lands to the temple by Vijayanagara kings were Ramadeva Maharaya (1620–30), Narasimha Deva, Vira Venkatapathi Rayadeva Maharayar and Sri Venkatarayadeva Mahakavi, Kulothunga Deva and Rajendra I. There are also inscriptions referring to the gift of lands for conducting various festivals by other kings in the region like Maduranthaka Deva, Sadasiva Maharaya (1542–1570), Rama Deva Raya (1617–1632) and Venkata III (1632-42).

Most scholars believe that the major structures of the temple were built by Vijayanagar kings during 14th century. There is an inscription on the Eastern wall in 1542 CE indicating grants to the temple by Thanjai nayak kings.

== Architecture ==
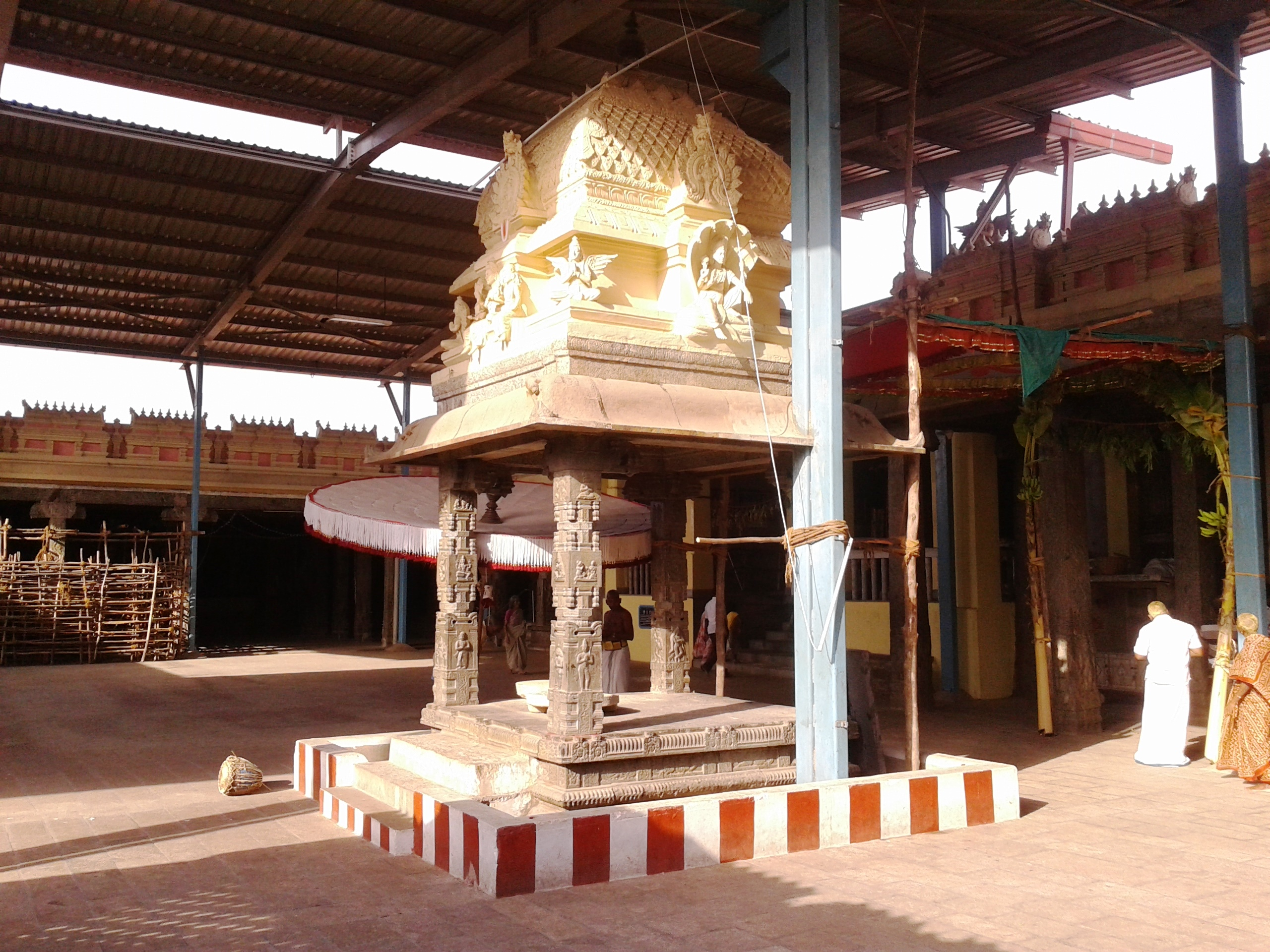
Festival deity

The temple is under the administration of Ahobila Matha. It has five tiered Rajagopuram (main gate). There are separate shrines for Kanakavalli, Ganesha, Alvars, and Gajalakshmi Thayar. Here, the Lord married Vasumathi the daughter of a king Dharmasena. There are also shrines to Ganesha, Gopalan, Nammalvar, Chakratalvar, Andal, Vedanta Desika, Ramanujacharyar, and Lakshmi Narasimhar.

The presiding deity Veeraraghava swamy is in a recumbent position (called Bhujanga sayanm) facing east. His right hand blesses the sage Salihotra and left hand in gnana mudra preaches to Brahma. The Vimanam (pyramidal roof over the sanctum) is called Vijayakoti Vimanam as it is a symbol of victory against Madhukaidapas asuras who were killed by Vishnu. The Thayar is called Kanakavalli (also known by the name Vasumati) and her shrine is located parallel to the sanctum. There are shrines of Alvars, Ranganatha and Hanuman located around the sanctum in the first precinct. The sacred tank is called Hrutatapanasini.

The presiding deity Veeraraghava Perumal is believed to cure diseases of his devotees and hence he is called "Vaithiya Veeraraghavan". There is another legend that Lord Shiva got rid of his Brahmahathi Dosha after worshipping Vishnu in the place. There is a small shrine for Shiva in this temple premises. The temple tank, Hritayathabhanasini, is located to the West of the temple and is believed to have medicinal effects. There is an ornate four pillared black stone hall called Vellikilamai mandapam where the festival image of the presiding deities are displayed every Friday.

This temple has the largest temple tank out of any Divya Desam, the 2nd largest temple tank of any Vishnu temple (1st being Manargudi Rajagopalaswamy), and the 4th biggest temple tank of any temple in the world.

== Religious importance ==
Vishnu as Veera Raghavar is the presiding deity of the Veera Raghavar temple. He is also called Vaidya Veera Raghavar, in view of his ailment curing abilities. In this temple people submit small metal sheets with a specific human organ engraved on them as a request to god to cure the illness or problems with those organs. It is believed that those suffering from incurable diseases are cured if they worship the presiding deity. Devotees come here for marriage, progeny, and for relief from hardships. The water in the tank is considered more sacred than that of river Ganga. A dip in the tank is believed to relieve the devotee from sins he committed in thought as well as action. Abishekam, the sacred ablution to the presiding deity is done only with sandalwood oil. The temple is considered the Vaishnavite temple equivalent of healing abilities of the presiding deity to that of the Vaitheeswaran, the presiding deity of the Saivite Vaitheeswaran Kovil. Thousands of devotees take a holy dip during new moon days and also pour molasses into the temple tank. Ramalinga Swamigal is believed to have been cured off his stomach pain after worshiping in the temple. He glorified the presiding temple in his works in Potri Panchangam.

The temple is revered in Naalayira Divya Prabandham, the 7th–9th century Vaishnava canon, by Thirumangai Alvar and Thirumalisai Alvar. The Alvar has sung praise, imagining himself as a lady and Veeraraghava as his lover. The temple is classified as a Divyadesam, one of the 108 Vishnu temples that are mentioned in the book. Many Acharyas have also written songs on the various forms of Bhaktavatsala in this Temple.

== See also ==
- Divya Desam
