= Tiruninravur Lake =

- Tiruninravur Aeri
- Location within Chennai Location within Tamil Nadu Location within India
- Location: Thiruninravur, Chennai, India
- Coordinates: 13°06′50″N 80°01′10″E
- Type: Lake
- Basin countries: India
- Surface area: 330 hectares (820 acres)
- Water volume: 200,000,000 cubic feet (5,700,000 m^{3})
- Settlements: Chennai

Thiruninravur Lake or Thiruninravur Aeri, is a lake spread over 330 hectares in Thiruninravur, Chennai, India. It is one of the largest lakes in the western part of the city.

In 2017, a proposal was sent to the government to restore the lake at a cost of ₹ 50 million.

== See also ==
- Water management in Chennai
