= Putlur (Tiruvallur district) =

Neighbourhood in Tiruvallur district, Tamil Nadu, India

- Suburb in Tiruvallur
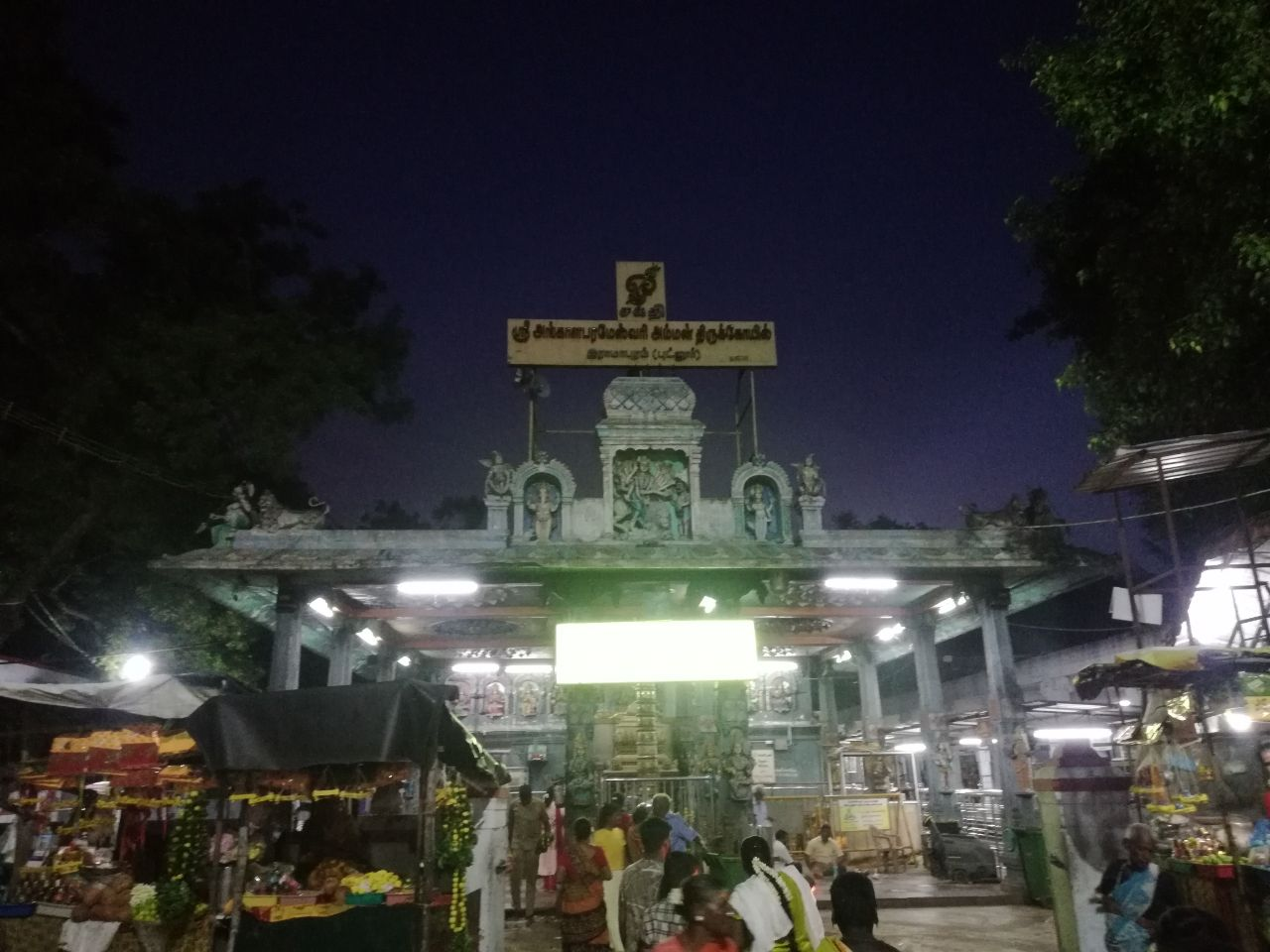
- Night view of the Entrance of the Putlur Amman Temple

- Location in Chennai, India Putlur (India)
- Coordinates: 13.117891°N 79.939049°E
- Country: India
- State: Tamil Nadu
- District: Tiruvallur District
- Metro: Chennai
- Talukas: Thiruvallur

Government
  - Body: DTCP

Languages
  - Official: Tamil
- Time zone: UTC+5:30 (IST)
- Lok Sabha constituency: Tiruvallur
- Vidhan Sabha constituency: Poonamallee
- Planning agency: DTCP

Putlur is a suburb in Tiruvallur district of Tamil Nadu, India, located in the northwestern part of the Chennai Metropolitan Area. Putlur is also governed for development purpose by the body of Chennai Metropolitan Area.

== Etymology ==
The name "Putlur" comes from the Tamil term putru meaning "snake hole". Goddess Parvati is believed to have taken the unprepossessing form of a large anthill in this village, where a temple was later built. The village was eventually called "Putlur" meaning "the town of anthill".

== Landmarks ==
The suburb is known for the Goddess Angala Parameswari temple (temple dedicated to goddess Parvati, known as Poongavanathu Amman). According to the legend, the presiding deity is made of sand, which appears like a pregnant woman lying on the ground.

== Transportation ==
Putlur is served by Putlur railway station in the West line of the Chennai Suburban Railway Network.
