= Putlur railway station =

Railway station in Tamil Nadu, India

Putlur
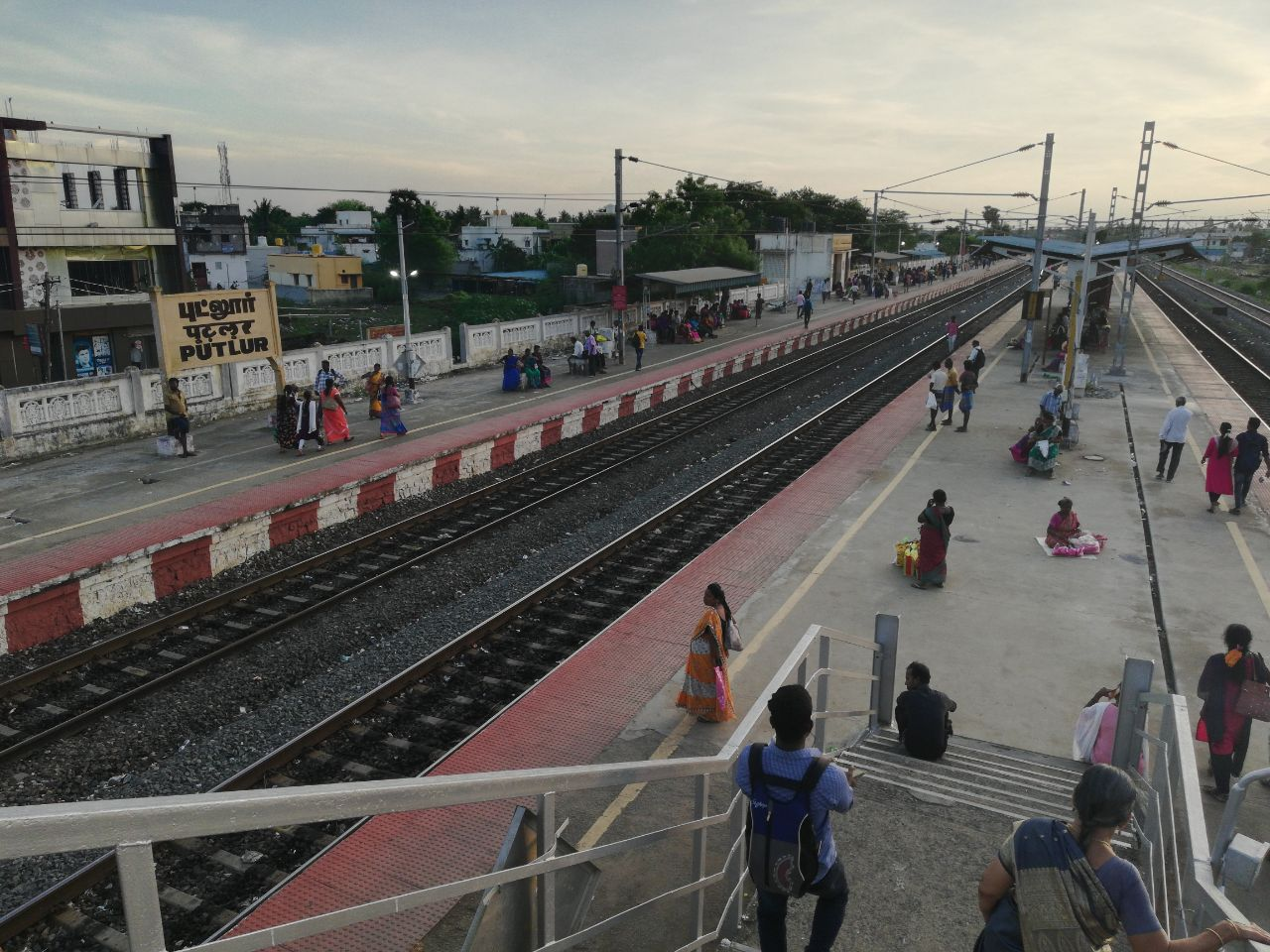
- Putlur railway station in June 2024

General information
- Location: Putlur, Tiruvallur district, Tamil Nadu, India
- Coordinates: 13°6′46″N 79°56′24″E
- System: Indian Railways and Chennai Suburban Railway station
- Owner: Ministry of Railways, Indian Railways
- Lines: West, West North and West South lines of Chennai Suburban Railway

Construction
- Structure type: Standard on-ground station

Other information
- Station code: PTLR
- Fare zone: Southern Railways

History
- Electrified: 29 November 1979
- Former names: South Indian Railway

Services
Preceding station	Chennai Suburban	Following station
Tiruvallur towards Arakkonam Junction	West Line	Sevvapet Road towards Chennai Central MMC
Route map
Chennai Central MMC — Jolarpet
Location

Putlur Railway Station is one of the railway stations of the Chennai Central–Arakkonam section of the Chennai Suburban Railway Network. It serves the neighbourhood of Putlur, a suburb of Chennai, and is located 39 km west of Chennai Central railway station. It has an elevation of 44 m above sea level.

Putlur is a halt station and not a full-fledged one.

== History ==
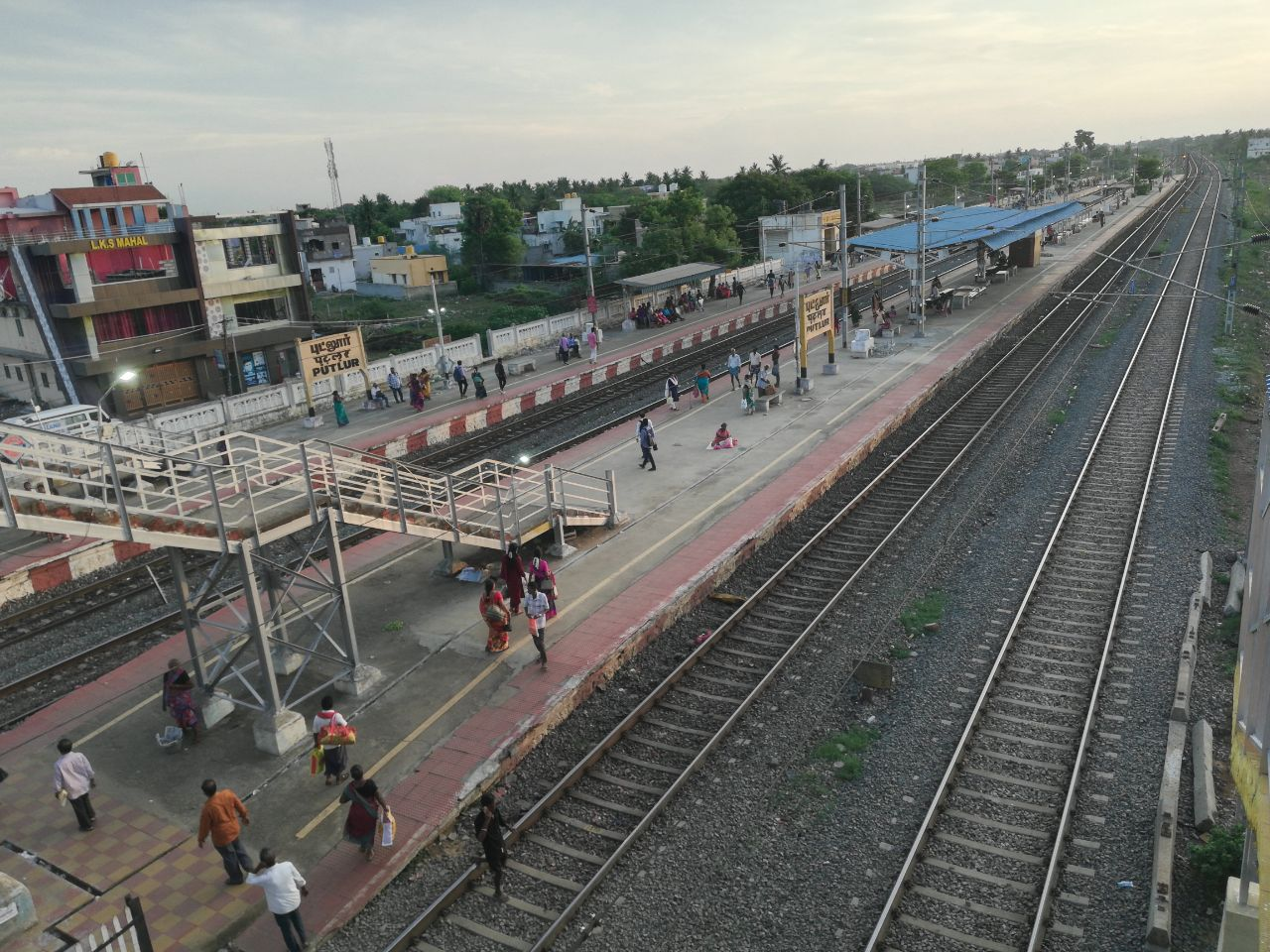
Putlur Chennai suburban station—westward view (June 2024)

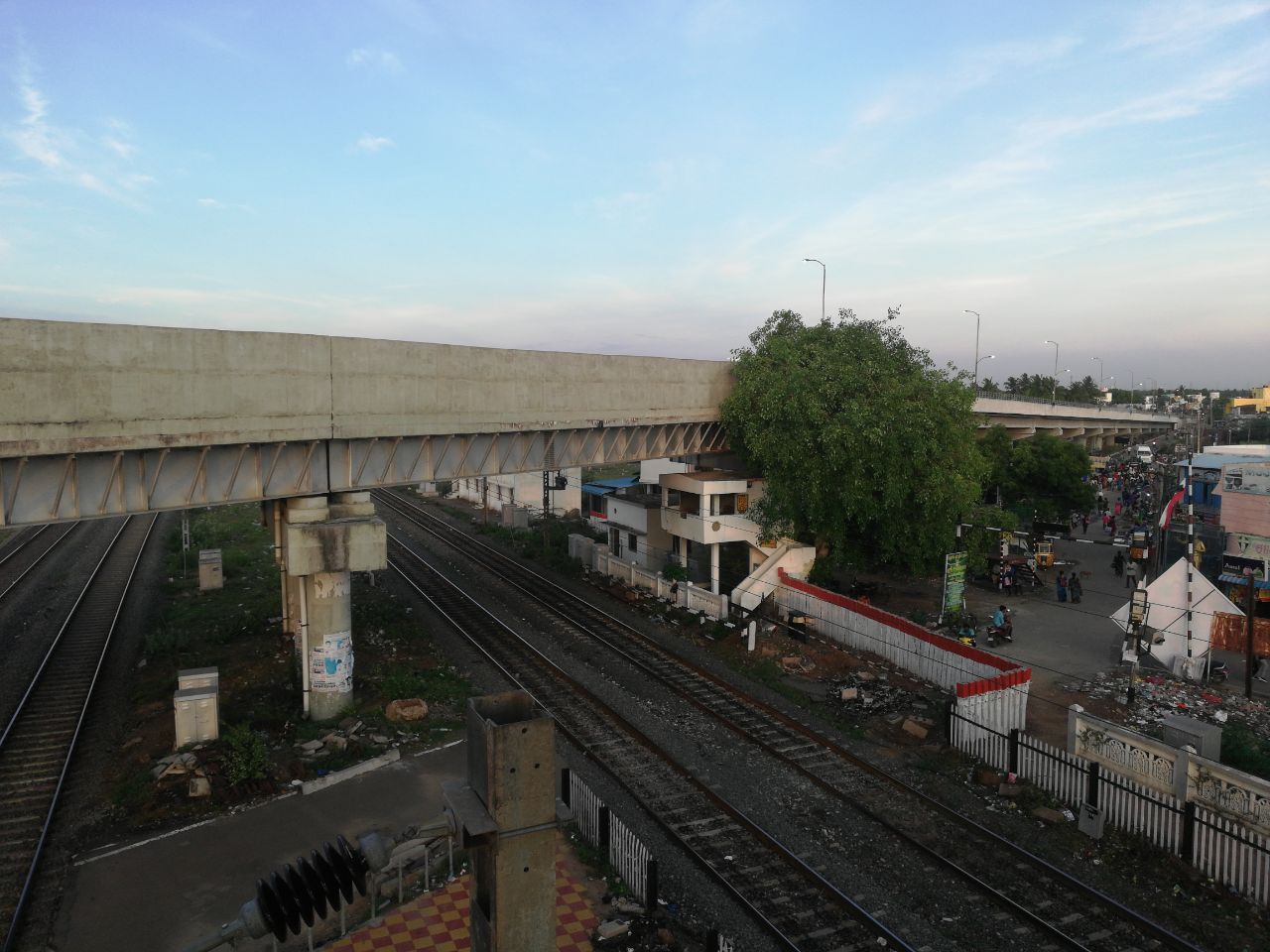
Road overbridge crossing the Putlur railway station

The lines at the station were electrified on 29 November 1979, with the electrification of the Chennai Central–Tiruvallur section.

== Station Layout ==
This suburban railway station consists of 2 Platforms (1 side platform and 1 island platform) which can fit an 24-coach express train.

G	North Entrance Street level	Exit/Entrance, FOB & ticket counter
P	Track 4	Towards → MGR Chennai Central
P	Track 3	Towards ← Arakkonam Junction / Jolarpettai Junction
P	FOB, Island platform | P2 Doors will open on the left | T3 & T4 – Express Lines
P	Platform 2	Towards → Chennai Central MMC next station is Sevvapet Road
P	Platform 1	Towards ← Arakkonam Junction next station is Tiruvallur
P	FOB, Side platform | P1 Doors will open on the left
G	South Entrance Street level	Exit/Entrance & ticket counter

== See also ==
- Chennai Suburban Railway
- Putlur Angala Parameshwari Amman Temple
