= Perumalpattu =

Neighbourhood in Tiruvallur district, Tamil Nadu, India

Perumalpattu Perumalpet
- Village
- Country: India
- State: Tamil Nadu
- District: Thiruvallur
- Metro: Chennai City

Population
  - Total: 3,920

Languages
  - Official: Tamil
- Time zone: UTC+5:30 (IST)
- Postal code: 602024
- Vehicle registration: TN20
- Metro: Chennai
- Lok Sabha constituency: Thiruvallur
- Vidhan Sabha constituency: Thiruvallur

Perumalpattu is a suburb of Chennai Indian state of Tamil Nadu. It is situated between Chennai and Arakkonam near the Chennai–Arakkonam railway line. It is a town in the suburb of Chennai. Once upon a time the villagers lived near the koovam river which passes adjacent to the village, a big flood happened in the river which has resulted the villagers to migrate to the current land. ( so in Tamil "aaru peralapattadhinaal" its called as "peralapattu" and people later adapted perumal name in to peralapattu and called "perumalpattu". It is the western part of the city of Chennai. "perumalpattu" is part of the Chennai Metropolitan Area. The nearest railway station is Veppampattu railway station of the Chennai Suburban Railway Network.

== Etymology ==
The name can be attributed to the existence of a famous old Perumal (Lord Vishu of Hindu Mythology) temple.

== Population and Literacy (Census 2011) ==
- As per the 2011 Census, Perumalpattu has a population of 7,052 people (3,521 male, 3,531 female).
- Child population (age 0-6) is 593, about 8.41% of total.
- Sex ratio is 1,003 females to 1,000 males, which is slightly higher than the state average.
- The literacy rate is 90.26% (male: 95.07%; female: 85.53%).

== Government and politics ==
=== Civic Utility / Amenities / Services ===
Perumalpattu rettaikulam (twin ponds) was restored in 2019 by the villagers themselves.

In 2020 the rettaikulam (twin ponds) thamaraikulam was renovated by the village residents with the help of an NGO named United Way, Chennai.

== Transport ==
=== By Rail ===
The closest railway station is Veppampattu which is about 2 km from Perumalpattu and MTH Road serve as good transport from/to Chennai. Frequent electric train services are operated from Chennai.

=== By Road ===
New Railway Over Bridge (ROB) across the railway track near Vepampattu railway station to link the transport between two major roads Chennai-Tiruttani Highway (NH-205) and Thiruvallur-Poonamalee High road (SH-50) through Perumalpattu road(Construction on the process). Town can be approached by the Lucas - Thiruvallur high road or Poonamalle high road. Tamil Nadu Government has provided bus facility travel from Veppampattu to nearest town Poonamalee and to the Chennai shopping hub T. Nagar.

== Education ==
Raja National Mat.Hr.sec school, Sriram Vidya Manthir (CBSE & Matric), Gomathi vidhyalaya, Gnana Banu School and a few government schools are available.

Sriram Engineering College
