= Tiruvallur =

Tiruvallur திருவள்ளூர்
- Town
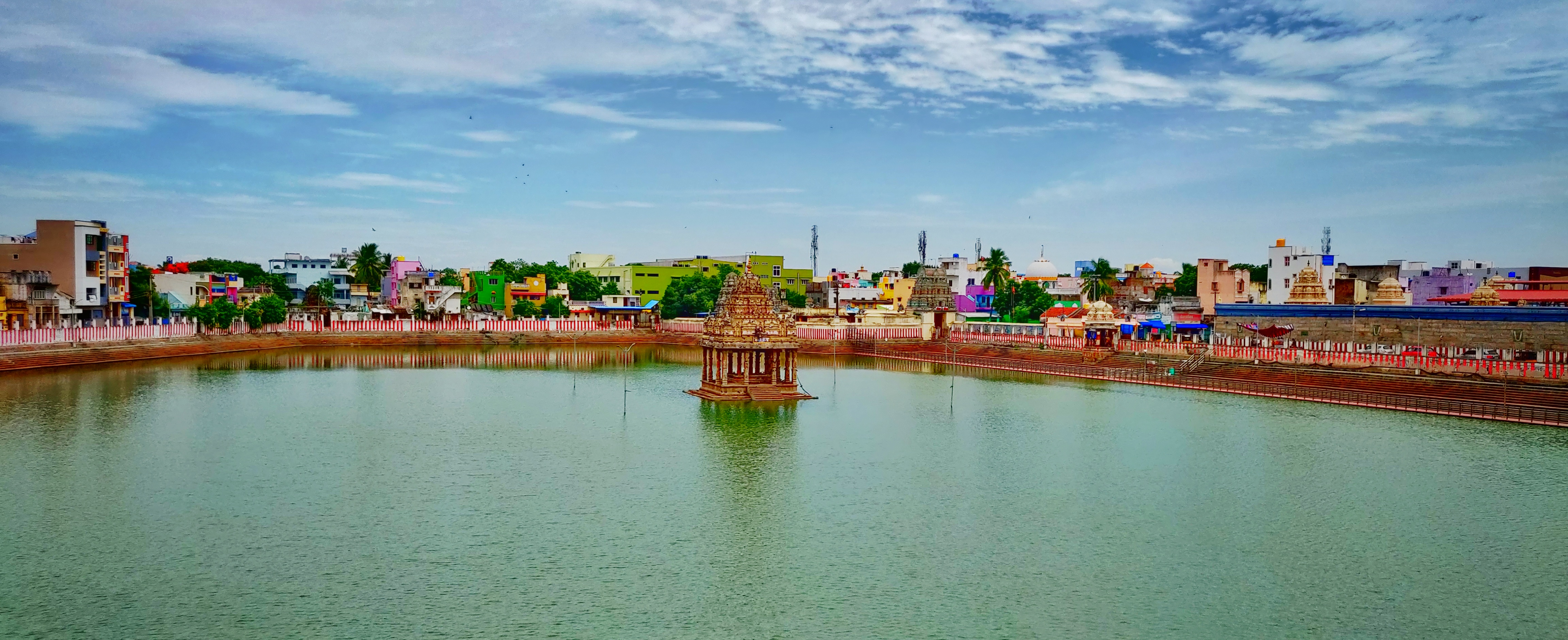
- Veeraraghava Swamy Temple's view from the temple tank
- Nicknames: Evvulur, Tiruevvulur, Tiruevvulkidanthan
- Tiruvallur (Tamil Nadu)
- Coordinates: 13.123100°N 79.912000°E
- Country: India
- State: Tamil Nadu
- District: Tiruvallur
- Established: 17th Century
- Named for: Veeraragava Temple

Government
  - Type: Grade I Municipality
  - Body: Tiruvallur Municipality
  - District Collector: S. Kavitha, I.A.S.

Area
  - Total: 10.65 km^{2} (4.11 sq mi)
- Elevation: 72 m (236 ft)

Population (2011)
  - Total: 54,416
  - Density: 5,109/km^{2} (13,230/sq mi)

Languages
  - Official: Tamil
- Time zone: UTC+5:30 (IST)
- PIN: 602001-602003
- Telephone code: 91-44
- Vehicle registration: TN-20
- Website: municipality.tn.gov.in/Tiruvallur/

Tiruvallur is a Town in the Indian state of Tamil Nadu in Chennai Metropolitan Area. It is located on the banks of Coovum river about 45 km (28 mi) from downtown Chennai (Madras) in the western part of the Chennai Metropolitan Area (CMA). It is a satellite town of Chennai and the administrative headquarters of Tiruvallur District. The town is known for the Veeraraghava Swamy Temple, one of the 108 sacred shrines of Vaishnavites. The tank festival is held at a pond near this temple. A Shiva temple near this shrine which is popular among the locals. There is also a 40-foot (12 m) tall Viswaroopa Panchamukha Hanuman temple, where the murti is made of a single green granite stone.

Poondi reservoir, from which drinking water is drawn to Chennai city, is about 9 km (5.6 mi) from Tiruvallur. The neighborhood is served by Tiruvallur railway station of the Chennai Suburban Railway Network. As of 2011, the town had a population of 54416.

It is a developing suburb in the western part of Chennai and forms part of Chennai's metropolitan expansion.

== Etymology ==
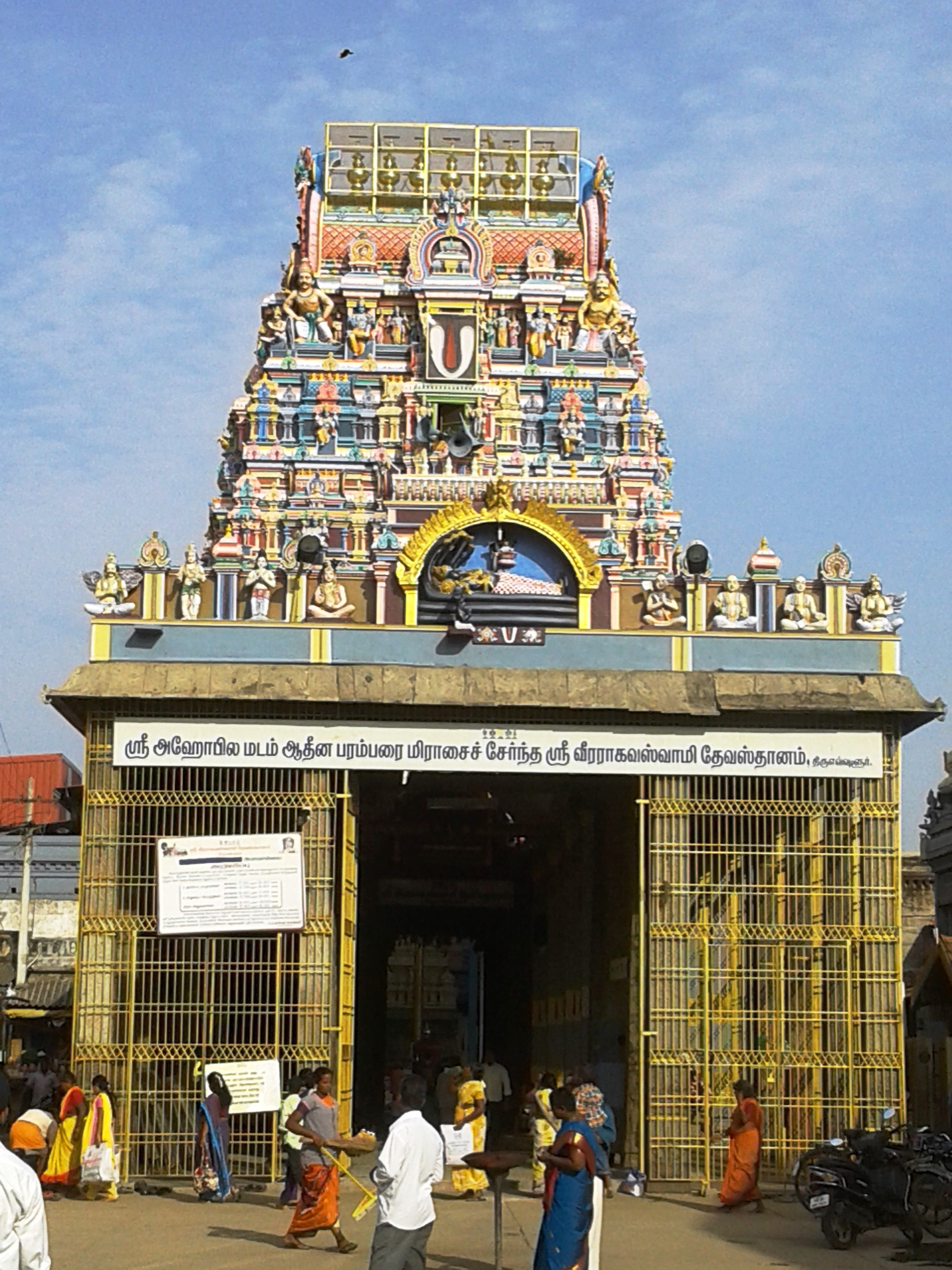
Gopuram of the Veeraraghava Swamy Temple, Tiruvallur

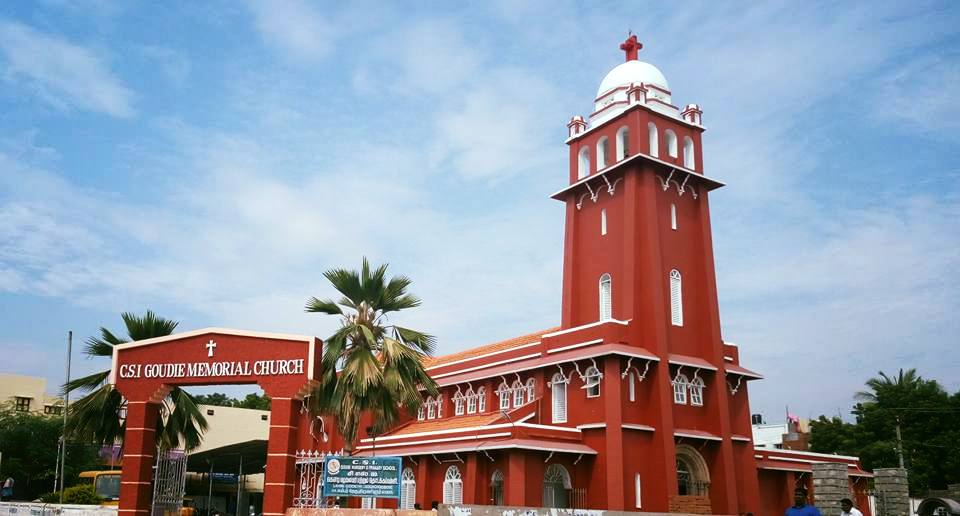
Goudie Memorial Church, Tiruvallur

The name Tiruvallur is supposedly derived from the Tamil sentence tiru evvull? – Tiru meaning god, a common prefix in South India for temple towns, and evvull meaning where do I sleep?. Tiruvallur is said to mean a place or town where the god Veera Raghavaswamy asked a saint for a place to sleep for a night..

The account is recited in the Markandeya Purana where, a Rishi (sage) named Saalihothirar once came down from Badrinath, now in Uttaranchal State, and settled in this place in order to reach Paramapadam (the abode of Lord Mahavisnu). He bathed in Hiruthaapanasana Theertham and started the vow of silence (mouna viratham) for one year. Daily he collected rice and after a year of fasting, he purified and cooked the rice, offering some to God (Naivedhyam) and kept the rest for himself. He waited for a guest, probably a muni or Rishi, so that he could invite him to eat and end his fasting. At that time Lord Narayana, intending to test the devotion of the Rishi, came there as an old muni looking very hungry and thirsty. On seeing him, Saalihothirar greeted him and offered a portion of the rice he had kept for himself, but Narayana wanted the entire quantity of rice. Saalihothirar was very happy to give all of the food to his guest, starving himself. After eating the food, Narayana asked, "where do I sleep?" (Tamil: Ev-uL-uRangalAm). Saalihothirar asked him to sleep in his own hut.. However, there is no historical evidence to back this account's varacity, but it finds mention in Naalayira Divya Prabandham in the works of Thirumangai Alvar in Periya Tirumoli in Hymn 1058 - 1067, where the Lord Veeraraghava Perumal is addressed as "எவ்வுள் கிடந்தானே" (Evvull Kidanthane).

== History ==
In the far past, this region was under a chain of regimes commencing from the Pallavas during the 7th century. In 1687, the Golkonda rulers were defeated and the region came under the Mughal emperors of Delhi. The towns and villages of this region were the scene of Carnatic wars. Battles are said to have been fought in this region during the struggle for supremacy between the English and French. The town of Pulicat was the earliest Dutch possession in India, founded in 1609; it was ceded to the British in 1825. British rule continued until India's independence in 1947.

== Demographics ==
Religious census
Religion	Percent(%)
Hindu	86.45%
Muslim	5.88%
Christian	6.17%
Sikh	0.02%
Buddhist	0.02%
Jain	0.35%
Other	1.12%
No religion	0.0%

According to the 2011, Thiruvallur had a population of 56,074 with a sex-ratio of 999 females for every 1,000 males, above the national average of 929. Scheduled Castes and Scheduled Tribes accounted for 19% and 0.6% of the population, respectively. The literacy rate of the city was 79.77%, compared to the national average of 72.99%. As per the religious census of 2011, Thiruvallur had 86.45% Hindus, 5.88% Muslims, 6.17% Christians, 0.02% Sikhs, 0.02% Buddhists, 0.35% Jains, 1.12% following other religions and 0.0% following no religion or with no religious preference.

== Politics ==
Tiruvallur assembly constituency is part of Tiruvallur Lok Sabha constituency. This constituency is represented in the parliament by Sasikanth Senthil of the Indian National Congress (part of INDIA Alliance).

Thiruvallur (state assembly constituency) is represented in the TN Assembly by V.G. Rajendran of Dravida Munnetra Kazhagam (DMK).

Tiruvallur Municipality Chairman Mrs. Udhayamalar Pon Pandiyan of Dravida Munnetra Kazhagam (DMK) also the Party's District Deputy Secretary .

== Landmarks ==
- Veera Raghavar temple – a place of worship for Lord Vishnu as Veera Raghavar
- CSI Goudie Memorial Church, Tiruvallur - Wesleyan Methodist church built on the Memorial of Late Rev. William Goudie.
- Hanuman Temple at Kakkalur – 3 km (2 mi) from Tiruvallur, this village temple has a 12-metre (40 ft) green monolithic granite murti of Lord Viswaroopa Panchamukha Hanuman (a.k.a. Panchamukhi Hanuman).
- Poondi Reservoir - from where the beautiful view of reservoir, dam and Kosasthalaiyar can be witnessed.

== Economy ==
The city attained district-headquarters status in 1997. Tiruvallur houses many industries including manufacturing facilities of Hindustan Motors, Caterpillar earth-moving equipment, Hanil Lear, Delphi TVS, India Japan Lighting, Kingfisher's brewery division, Style SPA furniture, TI India, TCL, and Mitsubishi. Tiruvallur is also home to the Pandurangan family of pen makers operating under the brand name Ranga.

Tiruvallur is surrounded by industrial hubs in and around Chennai, such as Ambattur Industrial Estate and Sriperumbudur Industrial Estate, which connect to Tiruvallur by suburban train and buses.

=== Developments ===
The Chennai Metropolitan Development Authority (CMDA) drafted a master plan to develop Tiruvallur as a satellite township around the city. This development is encouraged by developing infrastructure, such as affordable housing, in order to relieve congestion in the metropolis and provide a better standard of living. Tiruvallur has been officially annexed with Chennai Metropolitan Area (CMA) in the year 2022.

The Tamil Nadu government plans to develop a satellite township at Thirumazhisai, a town in Thiruvallur district about 18 km (11 mi) from Tiruvallur. According to Chief Minister J Jayalalithaa, it would build on 125.88 hectares (311.05 acres) of land owned by the Tamil Nadu Housing Board, at a cost of ₹2,160 crore (21.6 billion rupees).

=== Industries ===
Tiruvallur is a fast-developing district. The Kakkalur SIDCO lies in the eastern boundary of city which is main industrial area adjacent to city. Other than that, Caterpillar, Hindustan Motors, Kingfisher breweries has their factories near to city. Agriculture is also the mainstay of the economy. The major crops cultivated are paddy, sugarcane and groundnut, with smaller crops of millets (cumbu, ragi, tinai, etc.), pulses (red gram, black gram, green gram, etc.), gingelly and chillies. Vegetables, flowers and fruits (mango, banana, etc.) are also grown. Three cropping seasons are being followed in the district for paddy, viz, Sornavari (April–August), Samba (July–Jan) and Navarai (December–March).

Peripheral areas of the district have industrial units, with industry and commerce gaining a prominent position.

=== Stray cattle ===
In Tiruvallur, multiple vehicle accidents have occurred due to the stray cattle. Most of the accidents related to stray cattle on the roads occurred at night, when it is harder to see the animal on roads with insufficient lights. The residents of Tiruvallur district who allow their cattle to freely wander on the roads have been warned by the police. Imprisonment of up to three years and fine up to ₹5,000 are applicable according to the provisions of the Tamil Nadu Animals and Birds in Urban Areas (Control and Regulation) Act, 1997. Police have also threatened actions according to the Indian Penal Code and Prevention of Cruelty to Animals Act, in addition the stray cattle would be sent to cow sheds operated by the government. Yet these measures have not reduced the practice of cattle owners releasing their cattle. The authorities of Tiruvallur district have also set up call center to report incidents of stray cattle.

== Transport ==
=== Road transport ===
Tiruvallur is situated on the Chennai–Tirupati trunk road. Major road connecting Chennai and Tiruvallur include Chennai-Tiruvallur High Road which runs through Tiruninravur, Avadi, Tirumullaivayil, Ambattur and Villivakkam merges with New Avadi Road in metro area until Kilpauk. Another major road is Poonamallee - Tiruvallur Road which runs through Thirumazhisai, and merges with the Chennai-Banglore Highways at Nazarethpettai and enters the Chennai city via Poonamallee, Koyambedu, the same road can be used to navigate to Porur, Guindy and Saidapet via. Mount-Poonamallee Trunk Road. Other than above roads, direct roads leading to sub-urban/northern parts of Chennai City viz. Redhills, Ponneri were available from Tiruvallur. Further, other parts of Chennai and other districts can be accessed by reaching Chennai Outer Ring Road which runs East to Tiruvallur. Tiruvallur - Sriperumbudur Road connects the Tiruvallur with industrial hubs and with Chennai Bangalore Highways at Sriperumbudur and can be used to reach Singaperumalkoil. The newly proposed Chennai Peripheral Ring Road from Mamallapuram to Ennore runs through Tiruvallur.

Other than above roads, it is easy to reach Tirupati, Tirutani, Arakkonam, Sathyavedu, Uthukottai by road from Tiruvallur.

=== Railways ===
Tiruvallur Railway Station (TRL) is one of the oldest railway stations in India, the second train of south India ran from Royapuram to Tiruvallur on 1 July 1856. Sub-urban trains were the most preferred transport system by locals. The railway station is known in locality by rayiladi. Tiruvallur Railway Station remains one of the busiest sub-urban railway stations in Chennai Sub-Urban circle, it connects Tiruvallur with Chennai Central, Chennai Beach via. Avadi, Ambattur on East and Tirutani, Tirupati, Vellore via. Arakkonam on the West. The sub-urban trains at frequency of five minutes is available during peak hours, and on other times, the frequency remains one train for each hour. Only some of express and superfast trains were given stoppage at Tiruvallur due to high frequency of sub-urban trains.

=== Bus transport ===
Public bus transport in Tiruvallur is predominantly operated by two government owned corporations. The Metropolitan Transport Corporation (MTC) at Poonamallee Depot operates buses from Tiruvallur to various areas of Chennai City, viz. Redhills, Avadi, poonamallee, Sriperumbudur, Koyambedu, Thiyagaraya Nagar. The Tamil Nadu State Transport Corporation, Villupuram (Tiruvallur Depot) runs buses to other rural parts of Tiruvallur and to other nearby districts. Tiruvallur is not well connected by bus transport with other districts, as it was connected with Chennai. Direct buses to nearby districts viz. Kanchipuram, Chengalpattu, Chittoor, Tirupati alone were available. First long-distance daily bus service was launched by the State Express Transport Corporation from Tiruvallur to Tirunelvel via. Tindivanam, Trichy, Madurai (Route 180RU) in March 2024, the bus starts at 17.45 Hrs. from Tiruvallur. For all other long-distance buses, a short travel of one hour is required either to Kilambakkam Bus Terminus or Chennai Moffusil Bus Terminus.

=== Other transports ===
Chennai International Airport is 42 km (26 mi) southeast of the city. The newly proposed airport site at Green Field Airport at Parandur is 40 km to south of the city.

== Education ==
There are a large number of educational institutions in Tiruvallur. Many professional institutions, particularly the veterinary university, add to education in this district. Tiruvallur has many higher secondary schools including private and government schools. There are a few engineering, medical, and arts and science colleges around Tiruvallur.

Goudie Higher Secondary School It is the Oldest school in Tiruvallur district was established by FREE CHURCH OF SCOTLAND Mission in 1857 by Rev A. B. Campbell. Later in 1892 by Friendly transfer under that control of Mission it was transferred to Wesleyan Methodist Mission under the Leadership of Rev. William Goudie. Goudie built the High School with a clock tower in the current location and Opened on 16th May 1895. He also Opened a sperate School for Girls ( Wesleyan Hindu Girls School ) in the same street ( North Raja Street ). The Current Main Building was constructed and dedicated in the year 2007. And still its serving the education mission in and around Tiruvallur district.

J.N.N Matriculation & Higher Secondary School - was established in 2008 and is promoted by the Alamelu Ammaal Educational Trust.

Government medical college and hospital

The District Headquarters' Hospital of Tiruvallur has been upgraded to Government Medical College Hospital, Tiruvallur in the year 2022 inviting many other state and other district students to Tiruvallur. The main campus is situated near Master Plan Complex/Collector Office and the hospital is situated at main city itself.

Dr. Ambedkar Government Law College

The Dr. Ambedkar Government Law College, which functioned inside the campus of Madras High Court was bifurcated in the year 2018, and a new campus was built at Pattaraiperumanthur near Tiruvallur. This college is presently housing students of 3-year LL.B course and 2-year LL.M course. This college holds the record being the 8th best government law college in India for year 2023 by Indian Institutional Ranking Framework (IIRF) with score of 71.84%. Despite its positive side, the remote location of the college is widely criticized by its students and visitors.

=== Other major colleges ===
Field	Name	Location
Arts & science	Hindu College	Pattabiram
Arts & science	Jaya College of Arts and Science	Thiruninravur
Arts & science	John Bosco Art and Science College	Tiruvallur
Arts & science	Dr. Sir Arcot Lakshmana Swami Mudaliar College of Arts & science	Vengal
Arts & science	Sri Ram Arts and Science College	Veppampattu
Arts & science	Loganatha Narayanasamy Govt. Arts College	Tiruvallur
Arts & science	Sri Subramaniaswami Government Arts College	Tiruvallur
Arts & science	Dr. Sir A.L. Mudaliar Vocational Arts and Science	Tiruvallur
Arts & science	Shri Chandra Prabhu Jain College for Men	Tiruvallur
Engineering	Prathyusha Engineering College	Thiruvallur
Engineering	Sri Ram Engineering College	Veppampattu
Engineering	Bhajarang Engineering College	Veppampattu
Engineering	Indira Institute of Engineering and Technology	Thiruvallur
Engineering	Jaya Engineering College	Thiruninravur
Engineering	John Bosco Engineering College	Tiruvallur
Engineering	Kumaran Institute of Technology	Tiruvallur
Engineering	Siva Institute of Frontier Technology, Technical Campus	Vengal
Engineering	Sri Venkateswara College of Engineering and Technology	Thiruvallur
Engineering	Sri Venkateswara Institute of Science and Technology	Thiruppachur Post
Engineering	Sree Sastha Institute of Engineering and Technology	Chembarapakkam
Engineering	Panimalar Institute of Technology	Poonamallee
Engineering	Alpha College of Engineering	Thirumazhisai
Engineering	Panimalar Engineering College	Poonamallee
Engineering	Srinivasa Institute of Engineering and Technology	Poonamallee
Engineering	Vel Tech Engineering College	Avadi
L.C.R. College of Engineering and Technology	Ramanjeri	
Hotel Management	Sriram Institute of Hotel Management and Catering Technology	Tiruvallur
Hotel Management	Sree Venkateswara International Institute of Catering & Hotel Management	Tiruvallur
Hotel Management	Alfaa institute of Hotel Management & Catering Technology	Madurai
Victory Institute of Catering & Hotel Management	Tiruvallur	
Dental	Priyadarshini Dental College and Hospital	Tiruvallur
Pharmacy	Jaya College of Paramedical Science	Thiruninravur
Pharmacy	National College of Pharmacy	Thiruninravur
Nursing	Indira College of Nursing	Pandur
Management	Indira Institute of Computer Application	Tiruvallur
Management	Indira Institute of Management and Research	Tiruvallur
TTI	Indira Teacher Training Institute	Tiruvallur

=== Schools ===
- Bharathidasan Matriculation higher secondary school
- Dharmamurthi Rao Bahadur Calavala Cunnan Chetty's Hindu School
- Calavala Cunnan Chetty's Hindu Matriculation Hr. Sec. School, Kakkalur
- CSI Goudie Hr Sec School
- Christ King Hr. Sec. School.
- Chellammal Vidyalaya Matriculation Higher Sec. School
- CSC Vivekananda Vidyalaya Matriculation School
- Dr.V Gengu Swami Naidu matriculation school, Vishnuvakkam
- Swamy Vivekananda Vidhyalaya Nursery and Primary School, Tiruvallur
- Vivekananda vidhyalaya matriculation school, Tiruvallur
- Gnana Vidyalaya Matric. hr.sec. School
- Joy Play School, 47, Veerannan street, Tiruvallur
- Active Millennium Kidz Play School.
- Sri Venkateshwara Matric. Hr. Sec. School
- Rollins Primary and Nursery School
- St.Anne's Matriculation Higher Secondary School
- Shree Nikethan Matric. Hr. Sec. School
- Shree Niketan Patasala, CBSE School
- Sri Lakshmi Hr. Sec. School
- Sri R M Jain Vidhyashram, V.M.Nagar, Tiruvallur
- Jacob Matriculation School
- K.E. Nataesa Chetiyar Higher Secondary School
- Kamaraj Matriculation School
- A B S Vidhya Mandhir school.
- National Lotus Matriculation Higher Sec. School
- Sidhaartha Mat. Hr. Sec. School, sevvapet
- Hindu nursery and primary school
- Bharathi Matriculation School, Poonga Nagar
- Venus Education Centre
- Jacob group of school, Manavalanagar
