= Thiruninravur =

Neighbourhood in Tiruvallur district, Tamil Nadu, India

Thiruninravur, Chennai
- Suburb
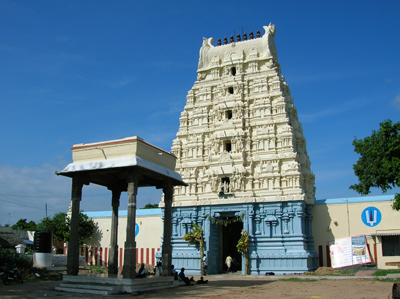

- Thiruninravur, Chennai Thiruninravur, Chennai (Tamil Nadu) Thiruninravur, Chennai (India)
- Coordinates: 13.1236°N 80.0279°E
- Country: India
- State: Tamil Nadu
- Metro: Chennai

Government
  - Type: Municipality

Area
  - Total: 11 km^{2} (4.2 sq mi)

Population (2011)
  - Total: 37,095
  - Density: 3,400/km^{2} (8,700/sq mi)

Languages
  - Official: Tamil
- Time zone: UTC+5:30 (IST)
- Postal code: 602 024
- Vehicle registration: TN 12 (RTO, Poonamallee)

Thirunindravur (also spelt Tiruninravur) is a suburban town and locality in the western part of Chennai city and falls under Tiruvallur district, Tamil Nadu. It lies within the Chennai Metropolitan Area (Greater Chennai), around 30 kilometers from the city center at Parry's Corner. The neighbourhood is served by Thirunindravur railway station of Chennai suburban railway. Thiruninravur lake provides the neighbourhood with water. It serves as the connecting hub between Chennai and Tirupati. It is included in the region managed by the CMDA.

== Demographics ==
As of 2011 India census, Thiruninravur had a population of 37095. Males constitute 50% of the population and females 50%. Thirunindravur has an average literacy rate of 91%, higher than the national average of 74%: male literacy is 95%, and female literacy is 88.6%.

== Place of worship ==
Sri Bhaktavatsala Perumal is a prominent Hindu temple located in Thiruninravur, a suburban area of Chennai, Tamil Nadu. The temple is dedicated to Lord Vishnu and is an important religious and cultural site for devotees, particularly in the western part of Chennai.

== Railway ==
Thiruninravur has a railway station on the Chennai Suburban Railway Network, making it well-connected to Chennai City. The Chennai Central-Arakkonam railway line passes through Thiruninravur.

== Roadways ==
The Outer Ring Road which is being laid in order to connect Vandalur to Ennore is being routed via Thiruninravur (Nemilichery) and more other places Greater Chennai area. The National Highway - NH205 passes through Thiruninravur and also referred to as MTH road or CTH road. The phase I from Vandalur to Nemelicherry (Thirunindravur) has been completed and is available for traffic.

The Tamil Nadu Highways department issued a GO on 4 October 2013 to extending the entire Chennai - Tiruttani highway to 6 lanes at a cost of 168 Cr. The first phase will involve extending the road to 4 lanes - 100 ft with center median and encroachments have already started to be removed.

== Education ==
Chennai Thirunindravur has various educational institutions, including schools and colleges, serving the local population.
