= Bhaktavatsala Perumal temple, Tirukannamangai =

Hindu temple in Tiruvarur

Bhaktavatsala Perumal Temple
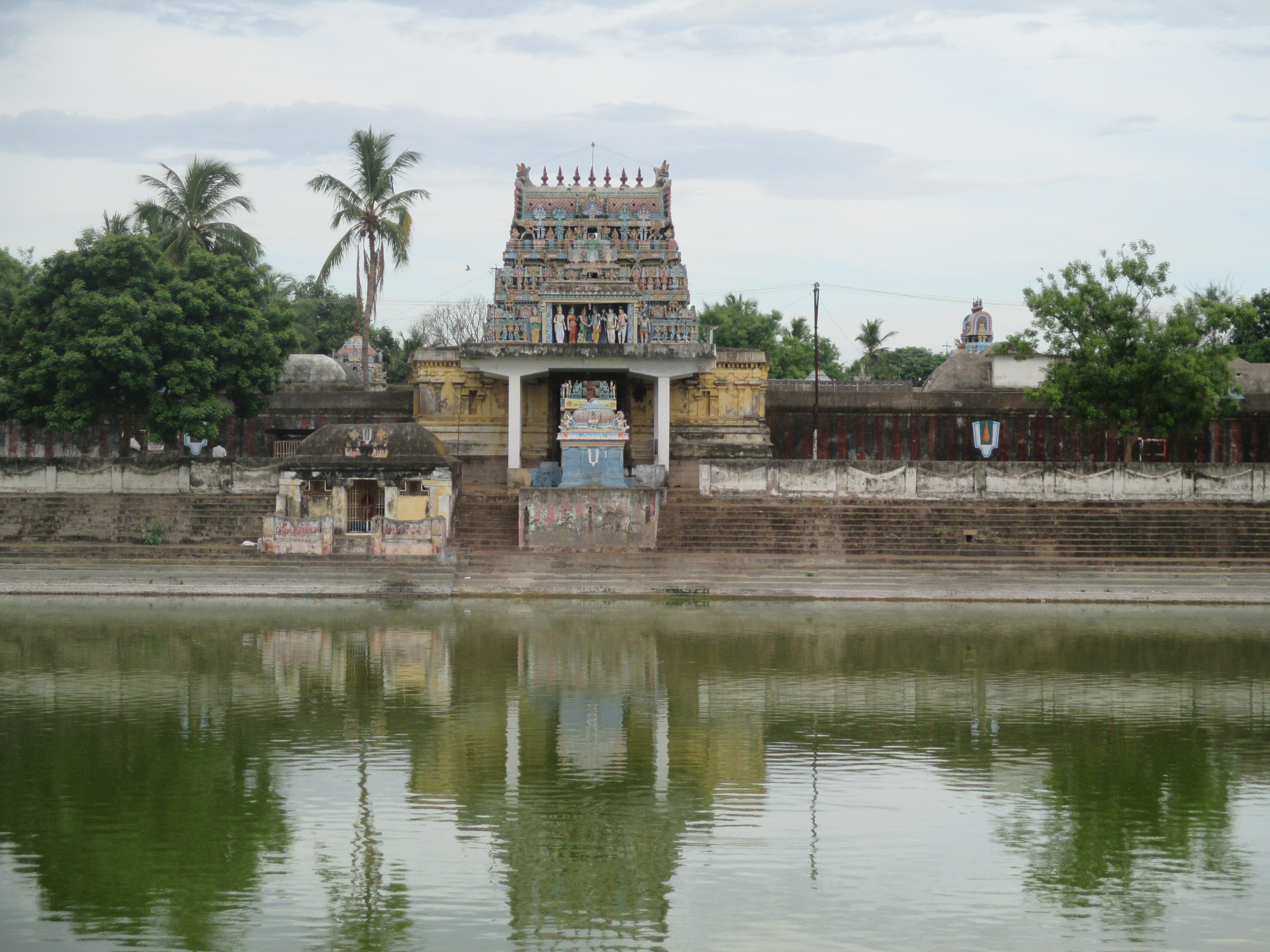

- Location in Tamil Nadu

Religion
- Affiliation: Hinduism
- District: Tiruvarur
- Deity: Perumpurakkadal (Vishnu), Kannamangai Nayagi (Lakshmi), Bakthavathsalan (Vishnu), Abhishekavalli
- Festival: Brahmothsavam Chithrai Month
- Features: Tower: Utpala; Temple tank: Darshana

Location
- Location: Thirukkannamangai, Kodavasal
- State: Tamil Nadu
- Country: India
- Interactive map of Bhaktavatsala Perumal Temple
- Coordinates: 10°47′58″N 79°35′13″E

Architecture
- Type: Dravidian architecture

The Bhaktavatsala Perumal Temple is a temple dedicated to Hindu god Vishnu, located in Thirukannamangai, a village in Tiruvarur district in the South Indian state of Tamil Nadu. Constructed in Dravidian style of architecture, the temple is glorified in the Nalayira Divya Prabandham, the early medieval Tamil canon of the Alvar saints from the 6th–9th centuries CE. It is counted as one among the 108 Divya Desams dedicated to Vishnu. Vishnu is worshipped as Bhaktavatsala Perumal and his consort Lakshmi as Kannamangai Nayagi.

The temple is believed to be of significant antiquity and is believed to be initiated by the Medieval Cholas of the late 9th century CE, with later contributions at different times from Thanjavur Nayaks. The temple has three inscriptions dating from the Chola period. The temple has a five-tiered rajagopuram (gateway tower) and enshrined within a granite wall. The complex contains all the shrines and the temple tank is located outside the main entrance of the temple.

Bhaktavatsala Perumal is believed to have appeared to marry his consort Lakshmi in the place. The temple observes six daily rituals and three yearly festivals. The chariot festival, celebrated during the Tamil month of Chittirai (March–April), is the most prominent festival of the temple. The temple is maintained and administered by the Hindu Religious and Endowment Board of the Government of Tamil Nadu.

== Legend ==
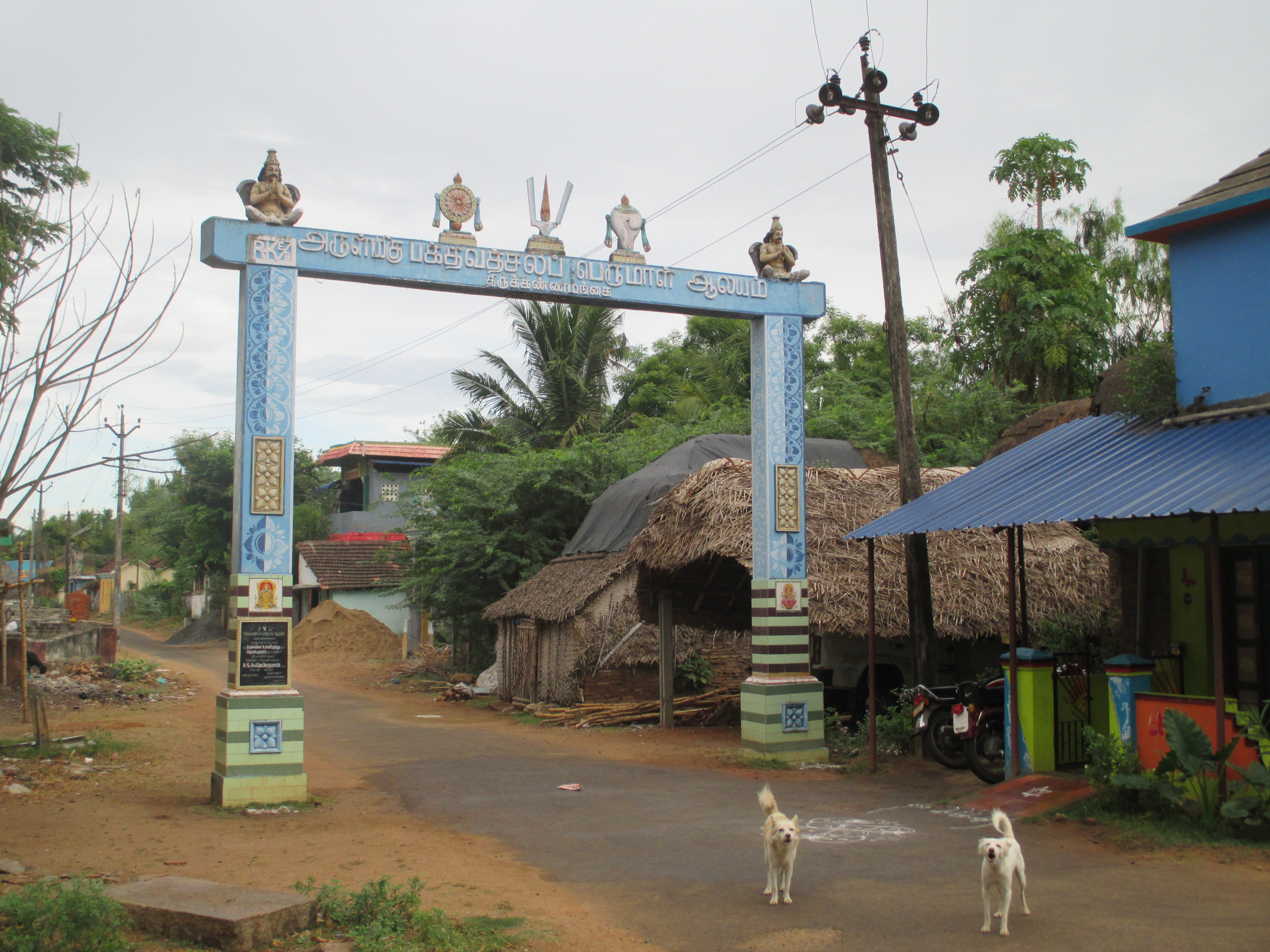
Image of the entrance arch

As per Hindu legend, Varuna, the guardian deity of the west and sage Romasa are believed to have worshipped Vishnu at this place. The beehive in the temple is believed to be devas worshipping Vishnu and in modern times, has special rituals performed for it. Shiva is believed to guard the four corners of the temple. As per another legend, when the Ocean of Milk was churned by asuras and devas, various objects emerged from it. At the end of it, Lakshmi, the goddess of prosperity, emerged, and was too shy to look at Vishnu. She went on to Thirukannamangai to perform penance seeking the hands of Vishnu for marriage. The festival deity of the temple is called Perum Purak katal as he is believed to have left his place to marry her. Local legend marks the places as Lakshmi Vanam, the forest where Lakshmi performed her penance. The temple tank is believed to have originated from the water drops in Brahma's cache when he worshipped Vamana, an avatar of Vishnu. The temple finds mention in Skanda Purana and Brahmanda Purana.

== Architecture ==
The temple has a 5-tier rajagopuram and a vast temple complex. The prime deity, Bhaktavatsalar has an imposing image. The temple tank is situated right opposite to the temple and is considered one of the largest temple tanks in the state. This shrine is also referred to as Saptamrita Kshetram (seven celebrated elements of nature), referring to seven of its elements such as Vimanam, Mandapam, aaranyam, tirtham, kshetram, river and town. The main entrance of the temple faces the East and at the entrance of the temple, there is a four pillared open hall. The temple has a 90 ft (27 m) tall rajagopuram (temple tower) and is enclosed by rectangular walls around it. There is a smaller temple tower on the western side. The walls of the temple is surrounded by large streets, through which the temple chariot passes along during festivals. A rare image of Buddha, image of Vaikunta Natha and Vishnu mounted on his eagle mount Garuda are the major images in the temple. There is a pillared hall leading to the shrine of Kannamangai Thayar shrine that has pillars with Nayak architectural representation.

== Festivals and religious practices ==
The temple follows the traditions of the Tenkalai sect of Vaishnavite tradition and follows vaikanasa aagama. The temple priests perform the pooja (rituals) during festivals and on a daily basis. As at other Vishnu temples of Tamil Nadu, the priests belong to the Vaishnavaite community, from the Brahmin varna. The temple rituals are performed four times a day: Kalasanthi at 8:00 a.m., Uchikalam at 12:00 p.m., Sayarakshai at 6:00 p.m., and Ardha Jamam at 8:30 p.m. Each ritual has three steps: alangaram (decoration), neivethanam (food offering) and deepa aradanai (waving of lamps) for both Bhaktavatsala Perumal and Kannamangai Thayar. During the last step of worship, nadasvaram (pipe instrument) and tavil (percussion instrument) are played, religious instructions in the Vedas (sacred texts) and Nalayira Divya Prabandam are recited by priests, and worshippers prostrate themselves in front of the temple mast. There are weekly, monthly and fortnightly rituals performed in the temple.

During the Tamil month of Chittirai, Brahmotsavam, a 10-day festival is celebrated and the festival deity is taken in procession around the streets of the temple in different mounts each day. The other festivals associated with Vishnu temples like Krishna Jayanti, Saturdays of Tamil month Puratasi, Navaratri, Vaikuntha Ekadashi and Vijayadasami are celebrated during the respective days.

== Religious importance ==
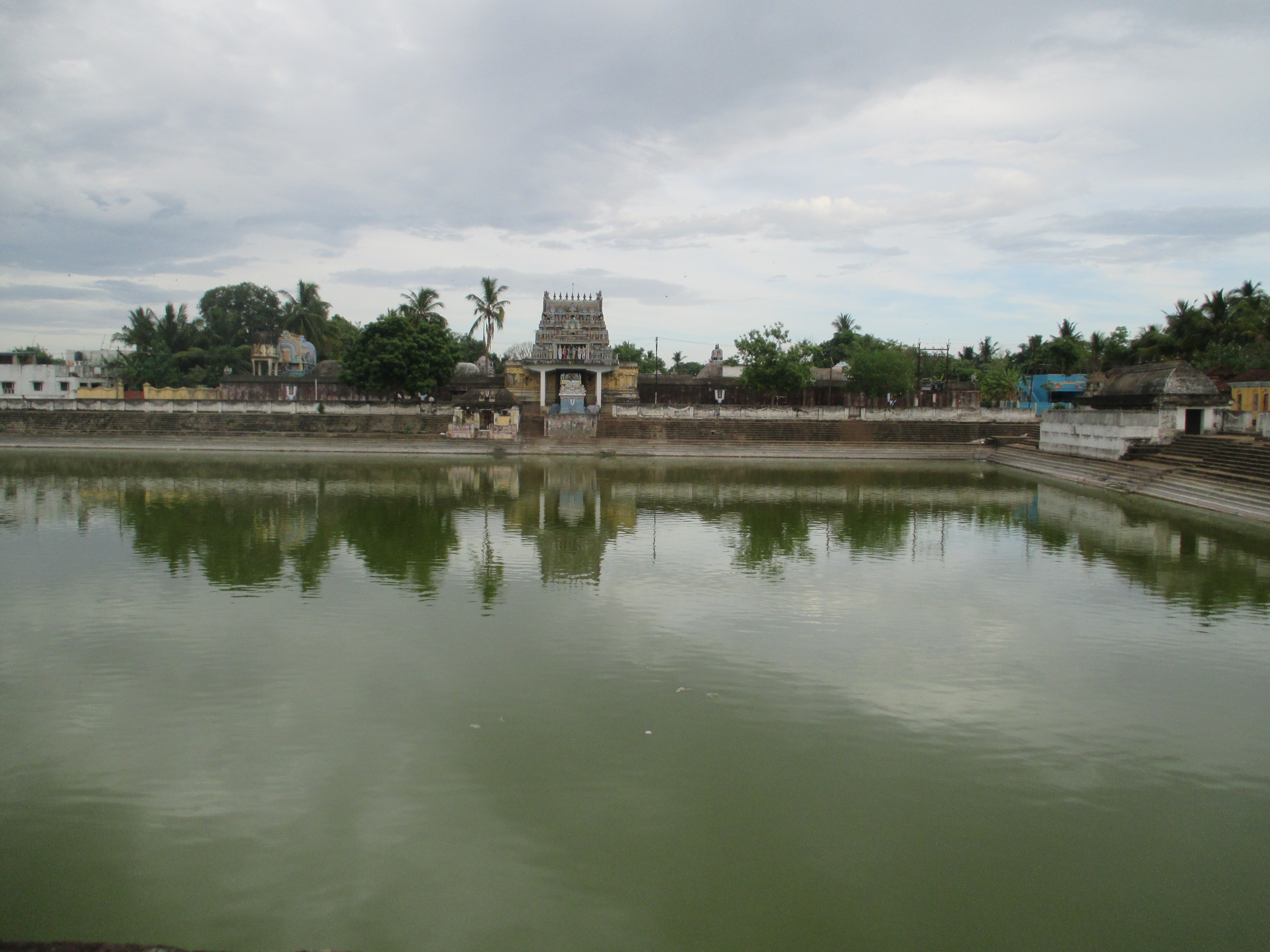
Image of the temple tank

Tirukannamangai is mentioned in Padma Purana, one of the 18 sacred scriptures of Hinduism. The temple is revered in Nalayira Divya Prabandham, the 7th–9th century Vaishnava canon, by Thirumangai alvar. The Alvar has sung praise, imagining himself as a lady and Bhaktavatsala as his lover. The temple is classified as a Divya Desam, one of the 108 Vishnu temples that are mentioned in the book. Many acharyas have also written songs on the various forms of Bhaktavatsala in this Temple. Tirukanna Mankaiyantan, the disciple of Nathamuni was born here during the 10th century. Thivyakavi Pillai Peruman has revered the presiding deity in his works of Notriyettu Tirupathi Kovai and Paravai Ramanujar in his works of Notriyettu Tirupati Tirupugal. One of the three Sangeetha Mumurthi, namely Muthuswami Dikshitar, has sung praise of the deity in his verses.

Pancha Kannan Temples
Loganatha Perumal Temple	Thirukannangudi
Gajendra Varadha Temple	Kabisthalam
Neelamegha Perumal Temple	Thirukannapuram
Bhaktavatsala Perumal Temple	Thirukannamangai
Ulagalantha Perumal Temple	Thirukkovilur

This temple is one of the Panchakanna (Krishnaranya) Kshetrams. Kannan refers to Krishna, the avatar of Vishnu, while pancha means five and Kshetrams refers to holy places. Four of the five temples are situated in Chola Nadu, in modern times, in the region surrounding Kumbakonam and Nagapattinam and one of them in Nadu Nadu. Krishna is not the presiding deity in any of the temples. The processional deity, Krishna, led to the derivation of the names of these places. There are five similar temples located in North India, called Pancha-dvarakas.

== See also ==
- Divya Desams
- Mangalasasanam by Divyadesam

== Gallery ==
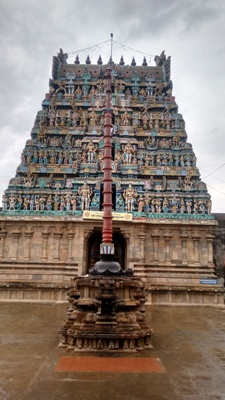

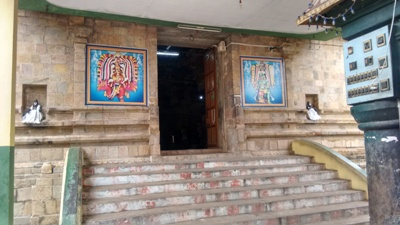

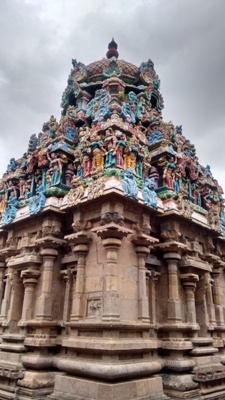

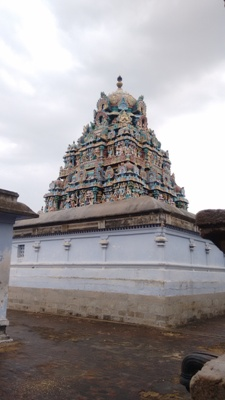

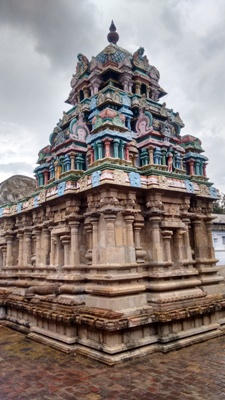

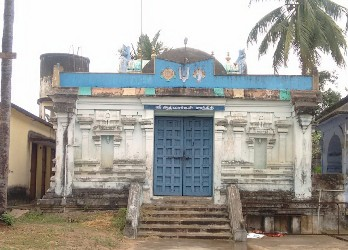

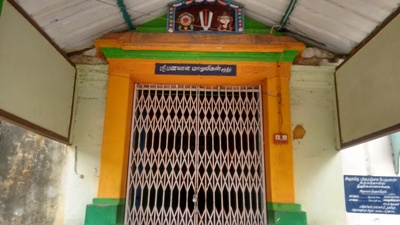
