= Ulagalantha Perumal Temple, Tirukoyilur =

Vishnu temple in Tirukoilur

Ulagalantha Perumal Temple
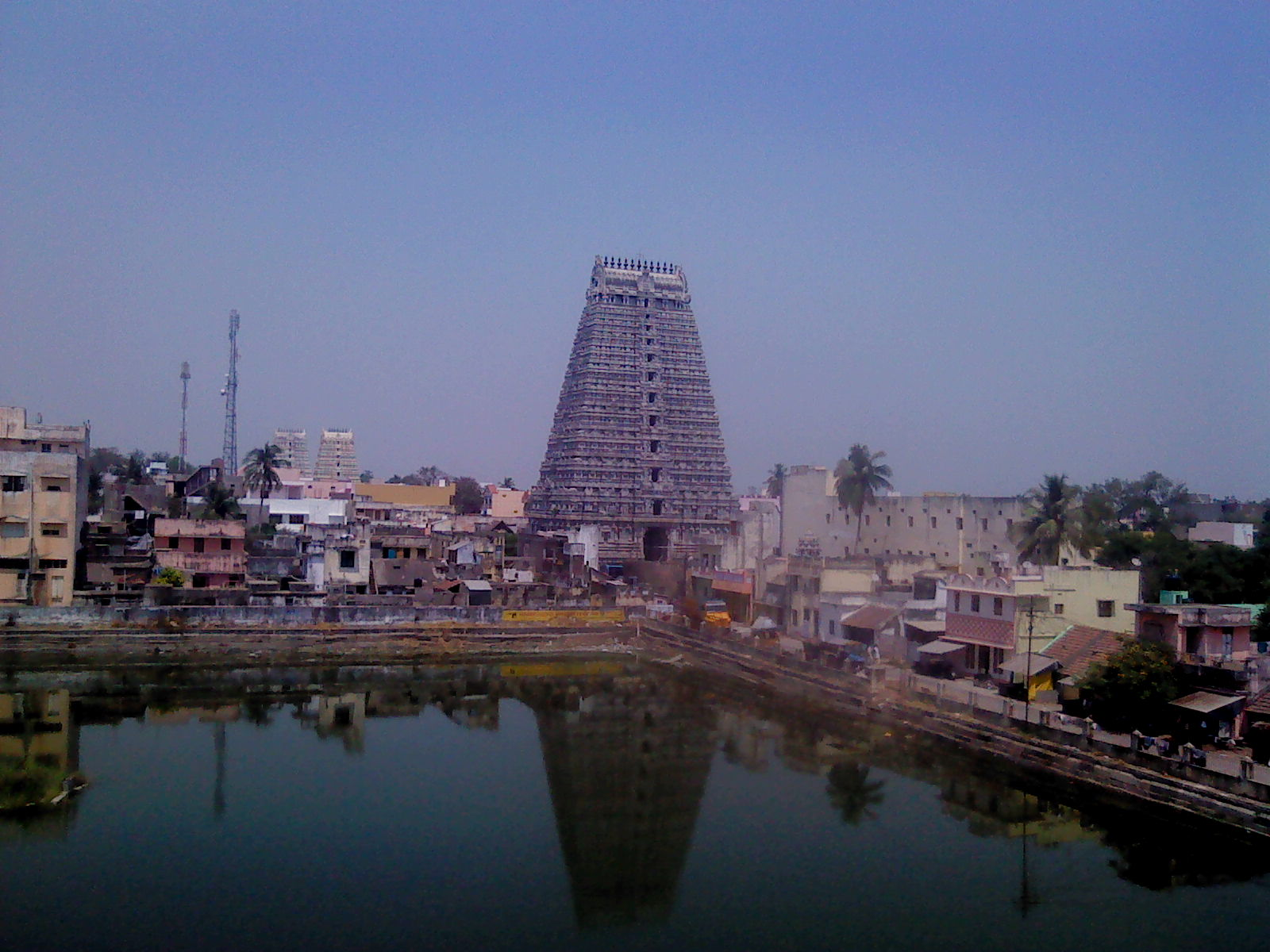

- Location in Tamil Nadu

Religion
- Affiliation: Hinduism
- District: Kallakurichi
- Deity: Ulagalantha Perumal, Trivikrama (Vishnu), Poongothai Nachiyar (Lakshmi), Aaaynar, Gopalan (Vishnu)
- Features: Tower: Sreekara; Temple tank: Pennar, Krishan

Location
- Location: Tirukkoyilur
- State: Tamil Nadu
- Country: India
- Coordinates: 11°58′01″N 79°12′7″E

Architecture
- Type: South Indian architecture

Ulagalantha Perumal Temple or Trivikrama Temple is a Hindu temple dedicated to Vishnu located in Tirukkoyilur, Tamil Nadu, India. Constructed in the Dravidian style of architecture, the temple is glorified in the Naalayira Divya Prabandham, the early medieval Tamil canon of the Alvar saints from the 6th–9th centuries CE. It is one of the 108 Divya Desams dedicated to Vishnu, who is worshipped as Ulagalantha Perumal and his consort Lakshmi as Poongothai. The temple is believed to have been built by the Medieval Cholas, with later contributions from Vijayanagara kings and Madurai Nayaks. The temple covers an area of 5 acres (20,000 m^{2}) and has a temple tower that is the third tallest in Tamil Nadu, measuring 192 ft (59 m) in height.

According to Hindu scriptures and beliefs, Vamana, a Brahmin dwarf avatar of Vishnu, appeared here to quell the pride of the asura king Bali. The temple is believed to be the place where the first three Alvars, the Vaishnava Saints, namely, Poigai Alvar, Bhoothathalvar, and Peyalvar attained salvation. The temple is one of the Panchakanna (Krishnaranya) Kshetrams, the five holy temples associated with Krishna, an avatar of Vishnu.

Ulagalantha Perumal is believed to have appeared to King Mahabali and the Alvars. The temple is maintained and administered by the Hindu Religious and Endowment Board of the Government of Tamil Nadu.

== Legend ==
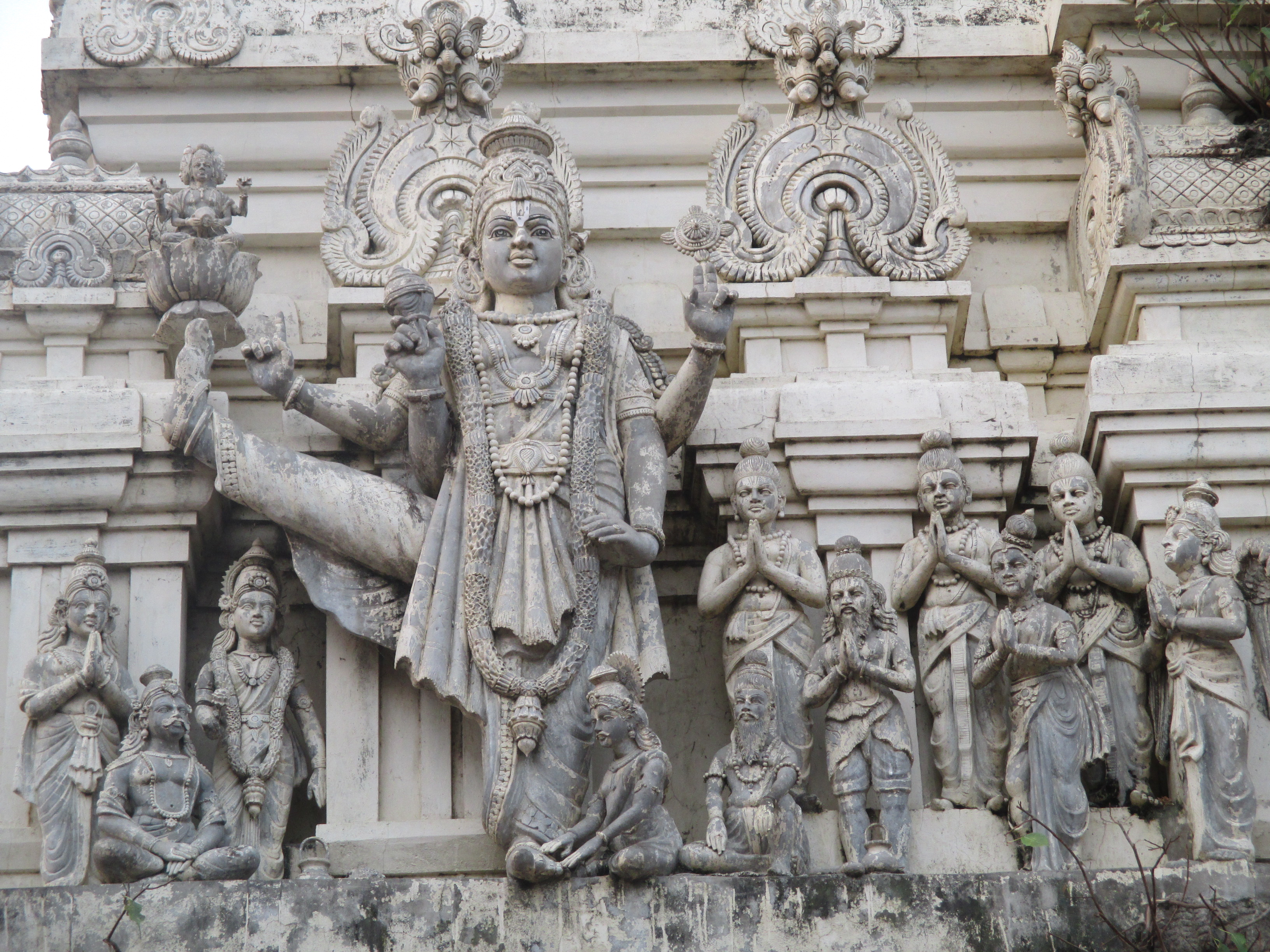
Legend showing Ulagalantha Perumal measuring earth and sky

The Bhagavata Purana describes that Vishnu descended as the Vamana avatar to restore the authority of Indra over the heavens, as it had been taken by Mahabali, a benevolent asura King. Bali was the grandson of Prahlada. King Mahabali was generous, and engaged in severe austerities and penance and won the praise of the world. With the praise from his courtiers and others, he regarded himself as the all powerful in the world. Vamana, in the guise of a short Brahmin carrying a wooden umbrella, went to the king to request three paces of land. Mahabali consented, against the warning of his guru, Sukracharya. Vamana then revealed his identity and enlarged to gigantic proportions to stride over the three worlds. He stepped from heaven to earth with the first step, from earth to the netherworld with the second. King Mahabali, unable to fulfill his promise, offered his head for the third. Vamana then placed His Foot and gave the king immortality for his humility. In worshiping Mahabali and his ancestor Prahláda, he conceded sovereignty of Pátála, the netherworld. Some texts also report that Vamana did not step into the netherworld, and instead gave its rule to Bali. In giant form, Vamana is known as Trivikrama. The legend is associated with Thrikkakara Temple in Kerala, but also with this temple and Ulagalantha Perumal Temple, Kanchipuram.

As per another legend, the temple is believed to have originally been a Krishna temple. The temple name, Kovilur, refers to the original deity Gopalan, indicating Krishna. As per Brahmanda Purana sage Mrikandu heard about Vamana avatar of Vishnu and wanted to have a view of it. Brahma directed him to visit the place and perform penance. The sage came to the place along with his wife Mithravathi to start the penance. The pair used to feed Brahmanas in their hermitage. To test their devotion, Vishnu appeared as a Brahmana and sought food from the pair. Since all food for the day were already given, Mithravathi was worried and prayed to Vishnu. All the vessels were full with food and she was able to feed the Brahman. Pleased by their devotion, Vishnu reappeared as Vamana - Thrivikrama form.

== Architecture ==
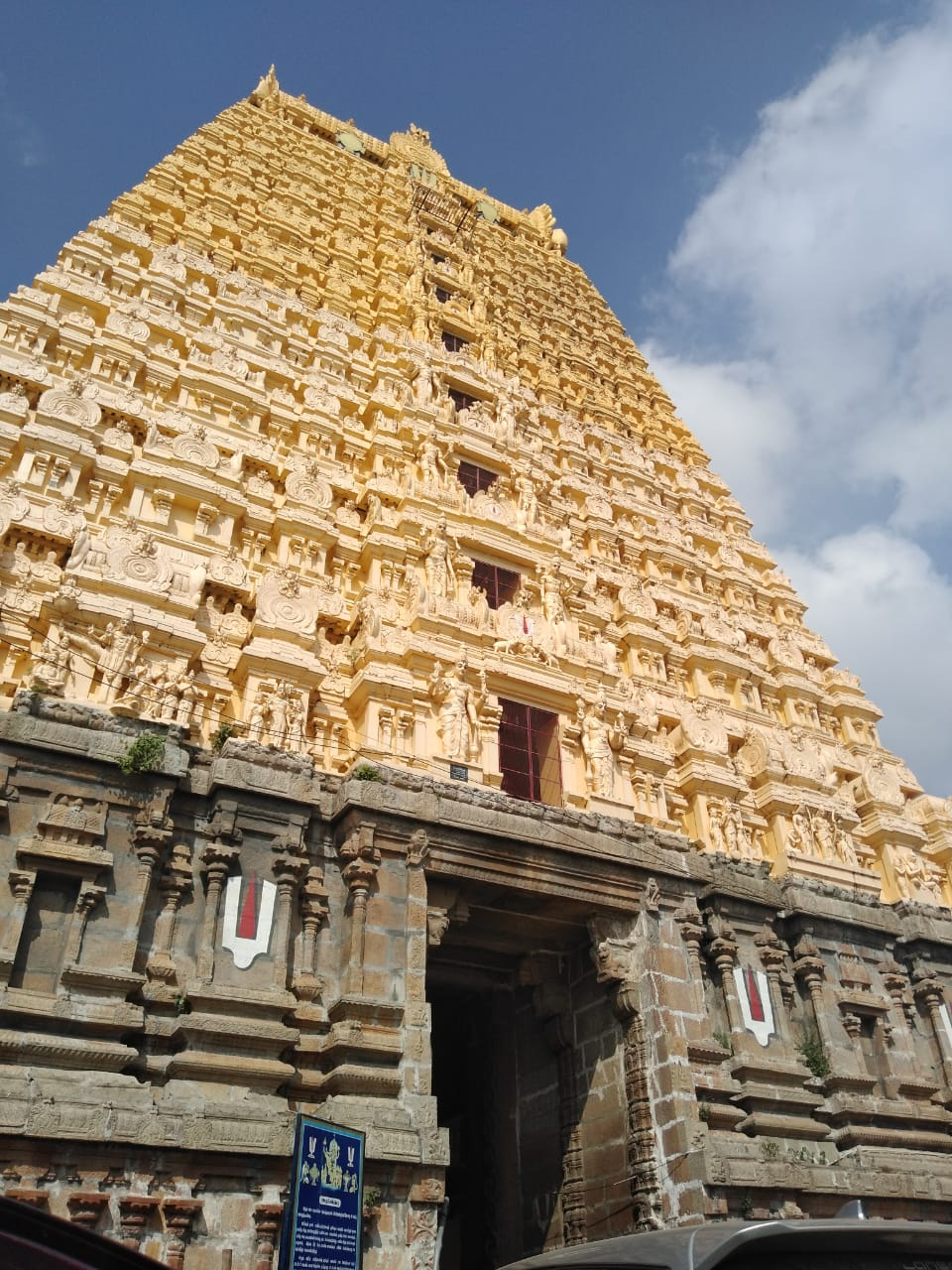
3rd Tallest goupuram in Tamil nadu

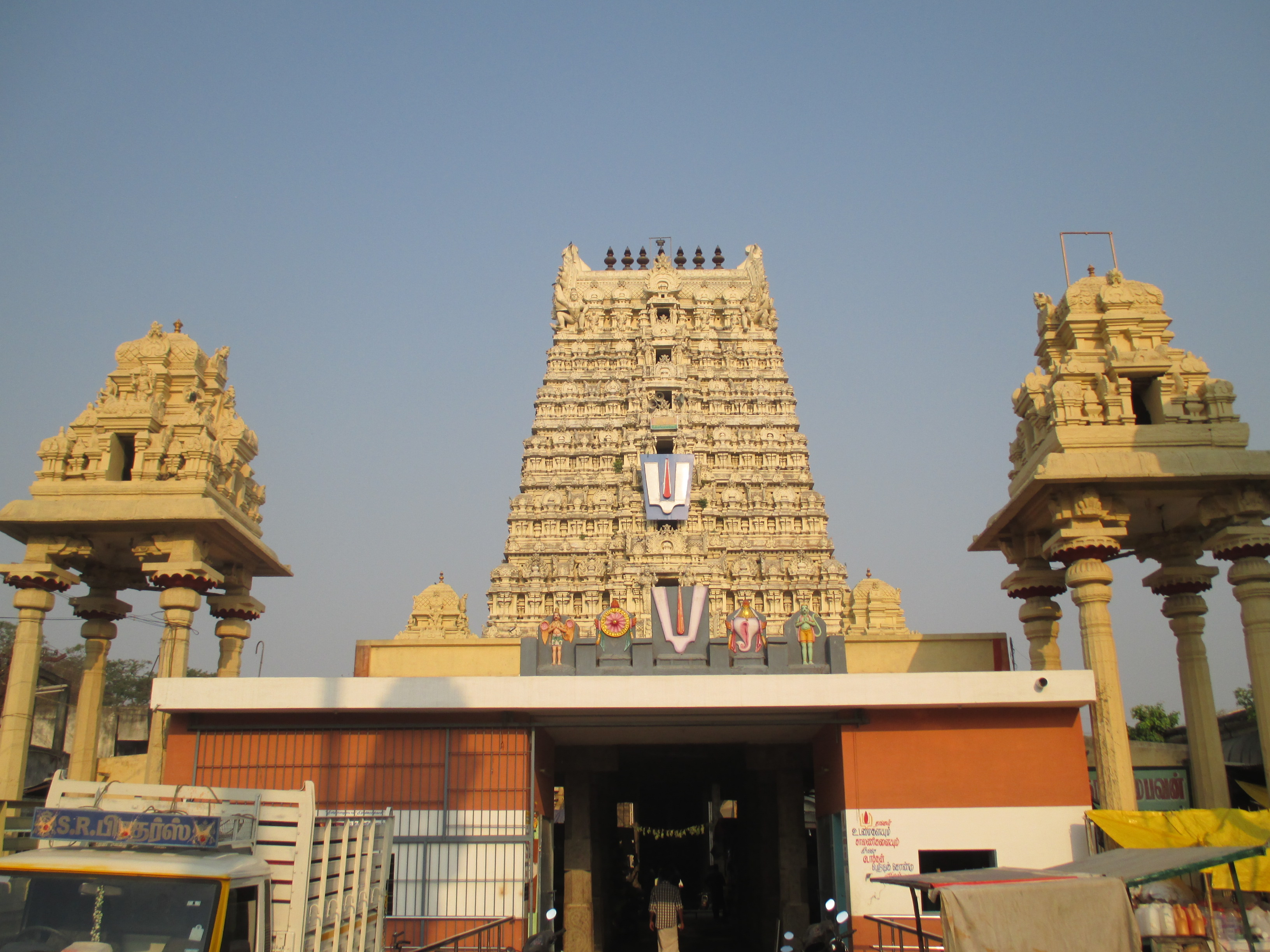
Image of the second gateway tower

The temple has an eleven-tiered rajagopuram with a height of 59 m (194 ft), the third tallest temple tower in Tamil Nadu, after the one in Srirangam Ranganathaswamy temple and Srivilliputhur Andal temple. The temple covers an area of 5 acres (20,000 m^{2}) and houses residential buildings in the precincts around the temple tower. The presiding deity, Ulagalantha Perumal, has an imposing image made of Tharu wood with foot raised. The images of Alvars are housed in the hall preceding the sanctum. The temple has two gopurams (gateway towers), with the one at the main entrance being the tallest of the two. The image of Vamana is located behind the sanctum. There are separate shrines for Lakshmi Narayana, Lakshmi Narasimha, Varadaraja, Rama, Andal, Chakratalvar, Vishvaksena, Manavala Mamuni and Ramanuja around the sanctum. The sanctum houses the wooden image of Ulagalantha Perumal. Unlike other Vishnu temples, Perumal is sported with Sankha in his right hand and Chakra on his left. The sanctum also housed the images of Mahalakshmi, Prahalad and Mahabali to the right of presiding deity and the images of Sukracharya, sage Mrikandu and the three mudhal Alvars (Pey, Bhoothath and Poigai Alvar) to his left. The festival deities, the metal images of Koovalan and Poongodhai Thayar are housed in the sanctum. Durga, otherwise housed only in Shiva temples, is a rare feature of the temple. The image of Krishna is made of saligrama stone and is housed in a separate shrine. There are separate shrines in the first precinct for Venugopala, Lakshmi Narayana, Lakshmi Raghava, Lakshmi Narasimha, Rama, Veera Anjaneya, Andal and Shukracharya, the guru of the asuras. Vishnudurga is housed in the sanctum sanctorum of the temple, which is one of the unique features of the temple.

Chakra Theertha is believed to have been from the waters used by Brahma to wash the feet of Vamana. It is believed that the water is source of river Pennar, which flows nearby the temple. Chank Theertha, located in the east, Akasha Ganga, Varava Theertha and Kalava Theertha are the various other temple tanks in the temple.

== Religious significance ==
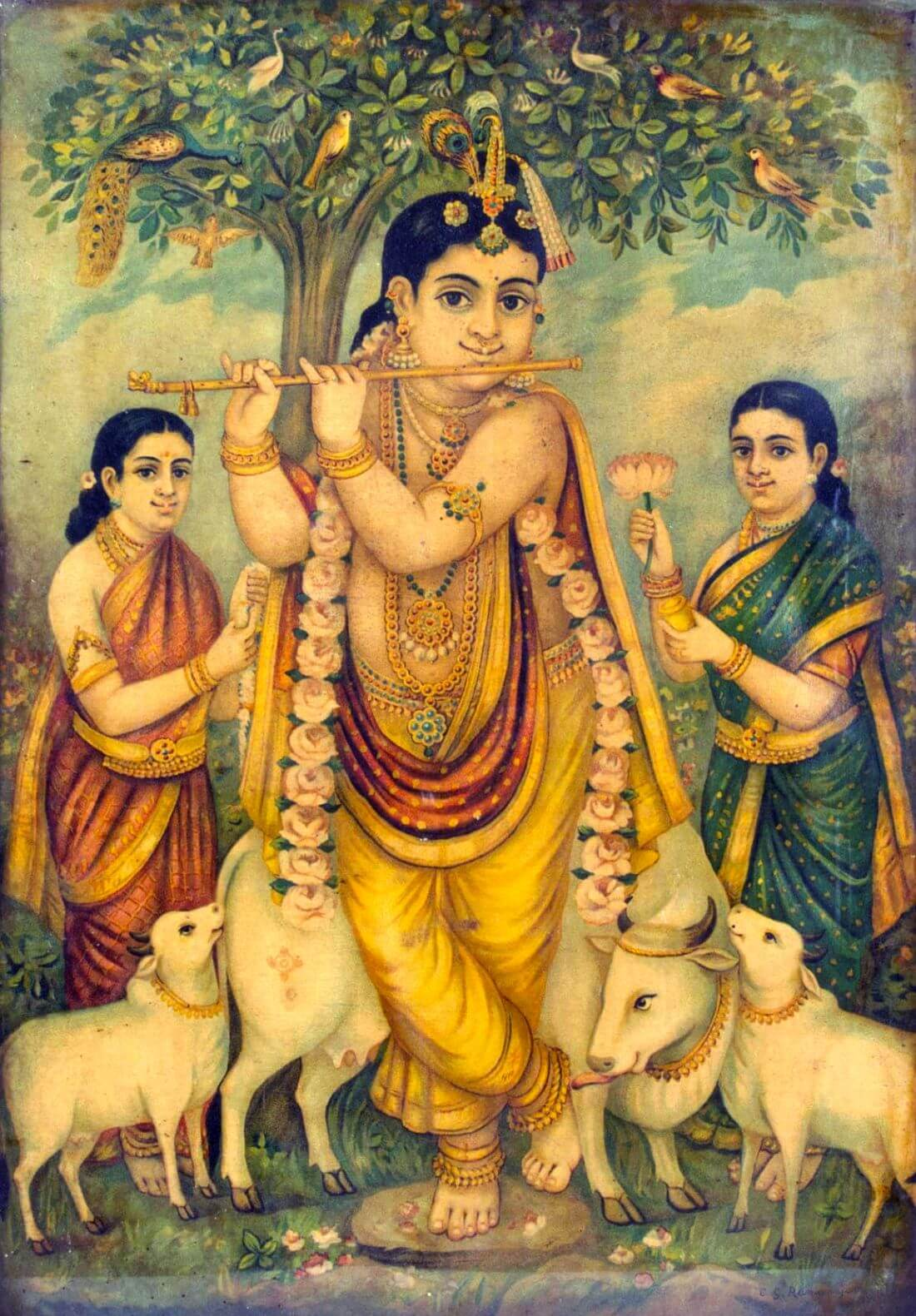
This temple is one of the Pancha Krishna kshethram and Krishna showers his blessings with Rukmini and Sathyabama

The temple is revered in the Naalayira Divya Prabandham, the 7th–9th century Vaishnava canon, by Tirumalisai Alvar in one hymn. The temple is classified as a Divya Desam, one of the 108 Vishnu temples that are mentioned in the book.

Pancha Kannan Temples
Loganatha Perumal Temple	Thirukannangudi
Gajendra Varadha Temple	Kabisthalam
Neelamegha Perumal Temple	Thirukannapuram
Bhaktavatsala Perumal Temple	Thirukannamangai
Ulagalantha Perumal Temple	Thirukkovilur

This temple is one of the Panchakanna (Krishnaranya) Kshetrams. Kannan refers to Krishna, the avatar of Vishnu, while pancha means five and Kshetrams refers to holy places. Four of the five temples are situated in Chola Nadu, in modern times, in the region surrounding Kumbakonam and Nagapattinam and one of them in Nadu Nadu. Krishna is not the presiding deity in any of the temples. The processional deity, Krishna, led to the derivation of the names of these places. There are five similar temples located in North India, called Pancha-dvarakas.

== Literature ==
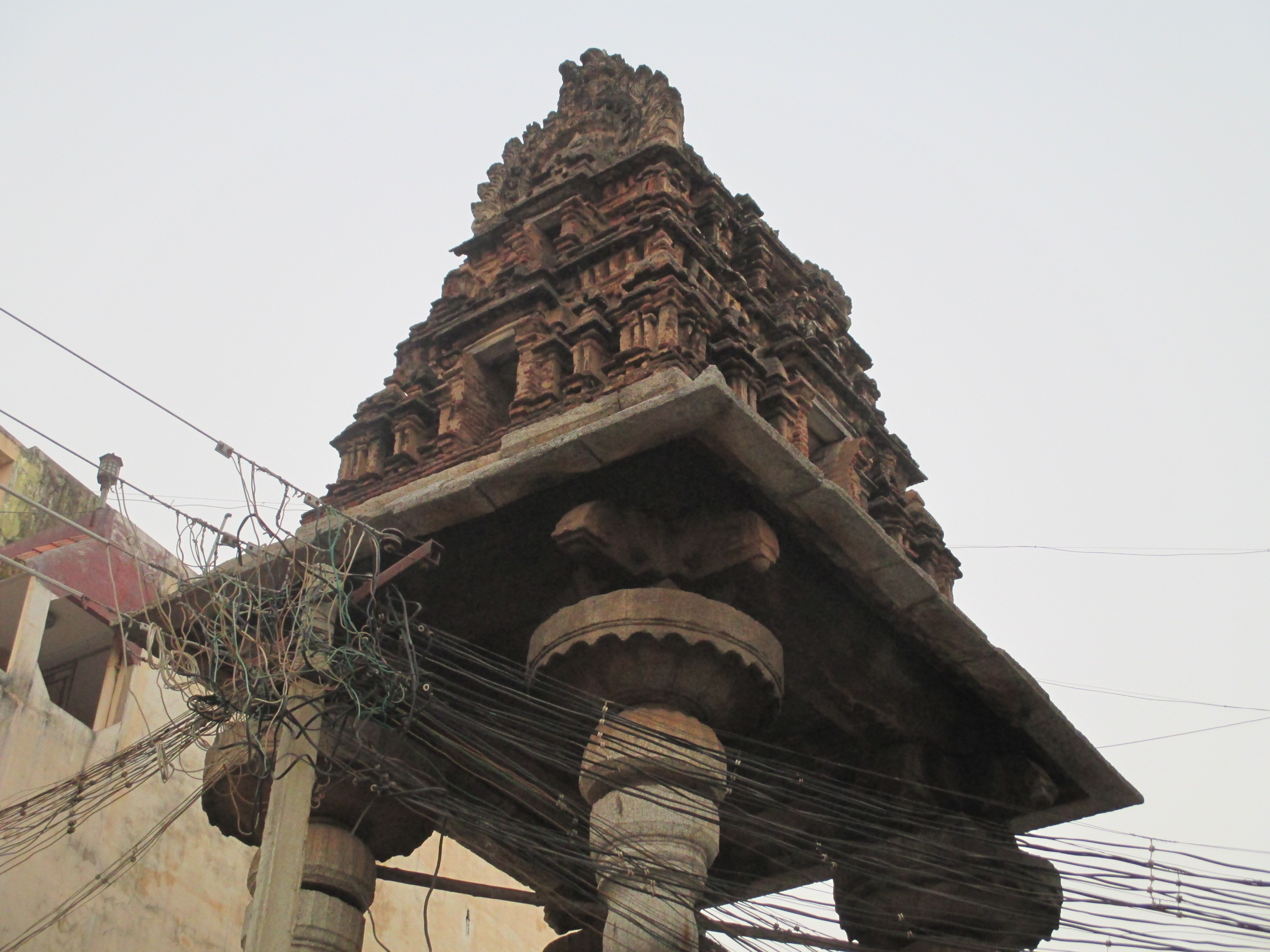
Eight of such pillared structures are found from the main entrance tower to the second

As per Hindu legend, Vishnu appeared to the mutal Alvars (first three Alvars) at Thirukkoilur. It was day time, but it darkened and started raining heavily. The wandering Poigai Alvar found out a small hide out, which has a space for one person to lie down. Bhootath Alvar arrived there looking for a hiding place and Poigai accommodated him, with both sitting together. In the meanwhile, Pey Alvar also came to the same place as all the three preferred to stand because of lack of space. The darkness became dense and inside the small room, they were not able to see each other. In the meanwhile, they felt a fourth person also forced his way among them. The three Alvars realised from the light of the lightning that the fourth one had a charming face that was sublime and divine. The trio could immediately realize that it was Vishnu who was huddling among them. Poigai wished to see Vishnu's face continuously but could view only from the simmering light of the lightning. With a view to maintain the continuity of light, he instantly composed hundred songs wishing the earth to be a big pot full of ghee like an ocean where the Sun could be the burning wick.

Tamil
வையம் தகளியா வார்கடலே நெய்யாக
வெய்ய கதிரோன் விளக்காக - செய்ய
சுடர் ஆழியான் அடிக்கே சுட்டினேன் சொல் மாலை
இடராழி நிங்குகவே என்று

Transliteration
Vayyam takaliyā vārkat̬ale neyyāka
veyya kat̬irōn vilakkāka - ceyya
cut̬ar āḻiyān at̬ikke cut̬inen col mālai
it̬arāḻi ninkukave enru

Deeming in the world as lamp; the full sea as ghee, the fierce-rayed sun as a luminous wick, I have twined a garland of speech for the feet of Him who wields the red flaming discus so that there may be freedom from the ocean of misery.

The song is also interpreted as the Alvar praying to god to remove the darkness and ask for his unlimited knowledge and power. Bhoothath Alvar also sang 100 songs imagining to light the lamp constantly through ardent love for Him. Pey Alvar sang another 100 songs where he described the enchanting charm of the divine face and the association of Narayana equipped with chakra and sankha, and his divine consort goddess Lakshmi.

The temple plays a special part in Sri Vaishnavism as it is where the first three Alvars sang the first three Thiruvandadhis compiled in Naalayira Divya Prabandam, the Vaishnava canon. Thirumangai Alvar, another Alvar saint also revered the deity in his verses compiled in Naalayira Divya Prabandam.

The temple finds mention in Sangam literature in Tamil from 3rd BC to 3rd centuries CE. Agananuru, Purananuru, Natrinai and Kurunthogai have mention about the temple. Malayaman Tirumudikari, the ruler of Thirukovilur, was lavished praise in the texts for his charitable disposition to the institutions. It is believed that Avvaiyar, the celebrated Sangam period poet, arranged marriage for two chieftains at this place. Poet Kapilar is believed to have found suitable grooms for king Pari's daughter Angavai and Sangavai at this place and set himself up in fire. The event is commemorated every year in a huge rock called Kapilar Kal, where a small shrine exists even in modern times.
