= Loganatha Perumal Temple =

Hindu temple in Nagapattinam, Tamil Nadu

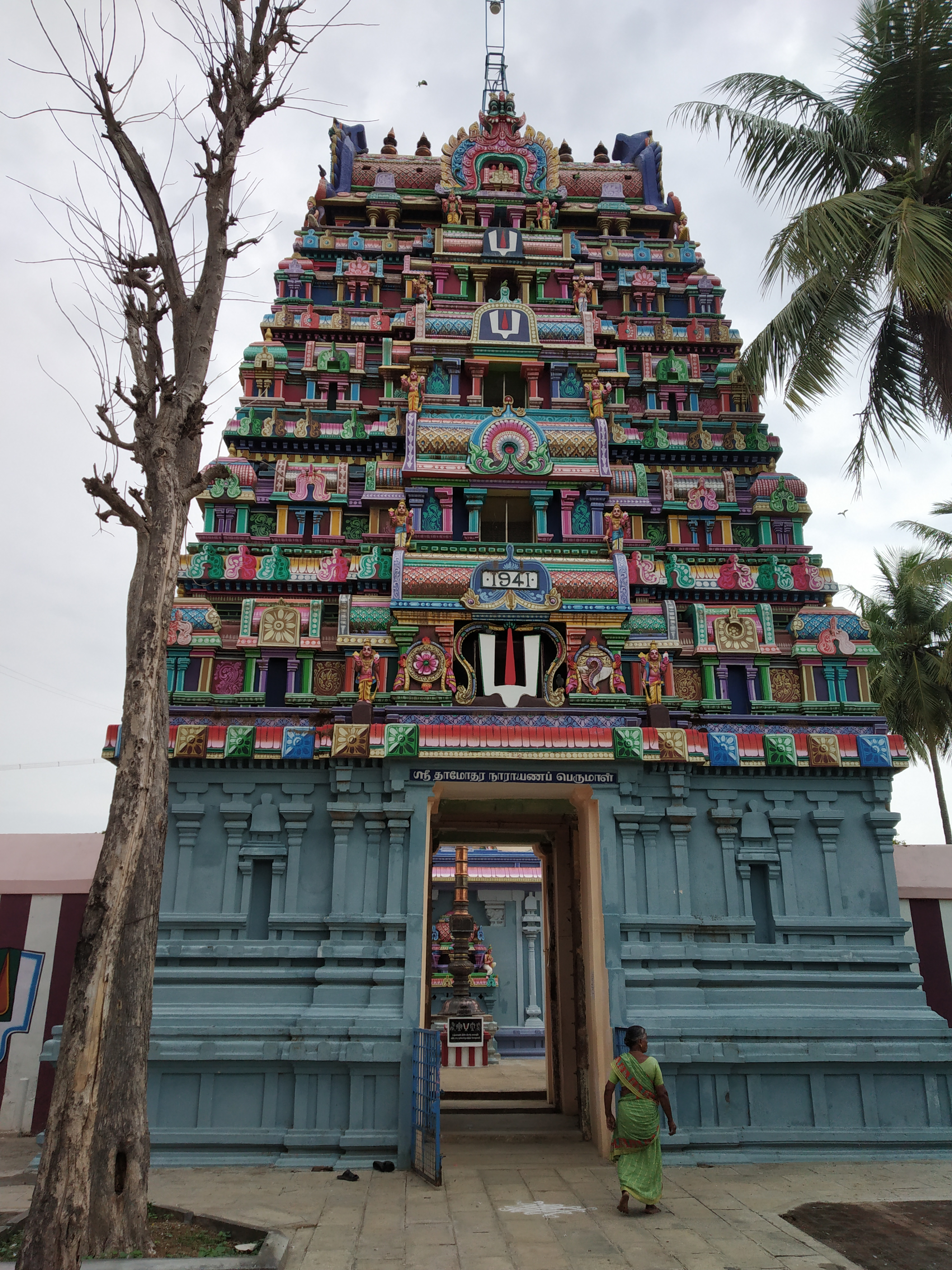

- Location in Tamil Nadu

Religion
- Affiliation: Hinduism
- District: Nagapatnam
- Deity: Loganathar (Vishnu) Aravindavalli (Lakshmi) Damodara Narayanan (Vishnu) Loganayaki (Lakshmi)
- Features: Tower: Utpala; Temple tank: Sravana

Location
- Location: Thirukannagudi, Sikkal
- State: Tamil Nadu
- Country: India
- Coordinates: 10°45′23.7″N 79°45′48.7″E

Architecture
- Type: Dravidian architecture
- Elevation: 33 m (108 ft)

The Loganatha Perumal Temple is a Hindu temple dedicated to Vishnu located 2 km away from Sikkal, Tamil Nadu, India on the Tiruvarur-Nagapatnam highway. Constructed in the Dravidian style of architecture, the temple is glorified in the Nalayira Divya Prabandham, the early medieval Tamil canon of the Alvar saints from the 6th–9th centuries CE. It is one of the 108 Divya Desams dedicated to Vishnu, who is worshiped as Loganatha Perumal and his consort Lakshmi as Loganayagi.

The temple is believed to have been built by the Medieval Cholas of the late 9th century CE, with later contributions from Vijayanagara kings and Madurai Nayaks. A granite wall surrounds the temple, enclosing all its shrines and its bodies of water. The temple has a five-tiered rajagopuram, the temple's gateway tower.

The deity Loganatha is believed to have appeared to Brahma, sages Gautama, Uparivasu, Vashista, Bhrigu, and Madarar . Six daily rituals and four yearly festivals are held at the temple, of which the Panguni Brahmostavam, celebrated during the Tamil month of Panguni (April–May), is the most prominent. The temple is maintained and administered by the Hindu Religious and Endowment Board of the Government of Tamil Nadu.

== Legend ==
As per Hindu legend, sage Gautama is believed to have worshiped the deity here. As per the temple legend, sage Vasishtha is considered the most devout devotee of Krishna, an avatar of Vishnu. Once the sage was worshiping Krishna with an idol made of butter. Krishna appeared in the form of a child, ate the idol and ran away. Vasishtha was chasing the child, who came running to this place. There were many other sages who were performing penance at this place. Krishna gave them a boon that he would be tied by the devotion of the sages and requested them to help Vashishta with his wishes. The sages requested Krishna to remain in this place and provide appearance to his devotees like he did for them. Vashishta and all the sages were pleased with the view of Krishna.

== Architecture ==
The temple has a five-tier rajagopuram and a vast temple complex. The temple tank is right outside the temple. The prime deity, Loganathar has an imposing image is housed in the sanctum. The sanctum is approached from the gateway tower through a flag staff located axial to the entrance and the sanctum. The sanctum is approached through two pillared halls named Mukha Mandapa and Ardha mandapa. The shrine of Loganayagi and other deities are located around the sanctum in the first and second precinct.

== Religious Significance ==
The temple is revered in Nalayira Divya Prabandham, the 7th–9th century Vaishnava canon, by Tirumalisai Alvar in one hymn. The temple is classified as a Divya Desam, one of the 108 Vishnu temples that are mentioned in the book.

Pancha Kannan Temples
Loganatha Perumal Temple	Thirukannangudi
Gajendra Varadha Temple	Kabisthalam
Neelamegha Perumal Temple	Thirukannapuram
Bhaktavatsala Perumal Temple	Thirukannamangai
Ulagalantha Perumal Temple	Thirukkovilur

This temple is one of the Panchakanna (Krishnaranya) Kshetrams. Kannan refers to Krishna, the avatar of Vishnu, while pancha means five and Kshetrams refers to holy places. Four of the five temples are situated in Chola Nadu, in modern times, in the region surrounding Kumbakonam and Nagapattinam and one of them in Nadu Nadu. There are five similar temples located in North India, called Pancha-dvarakas. Krishna is not the presiding deity in any of the temples. The processional deity, Krishna, led to the derivation of the names of these places.
