= Neelamegha Perumal Temple =

Vishnu temple in Nagapattinam

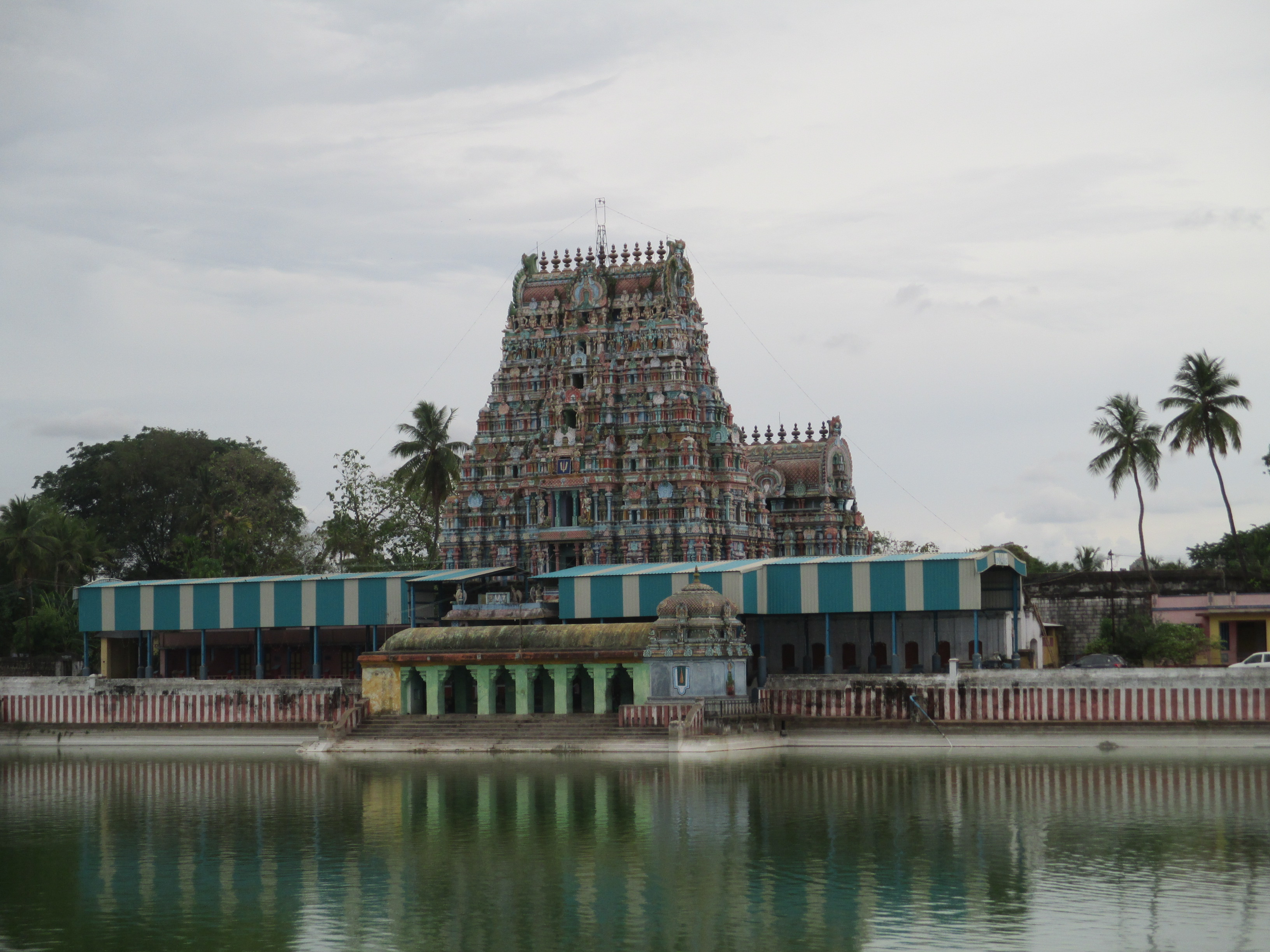
- View of the temple and the temple tank

- Location in Tamil Nadu

Religion
- Affiliation: Hinduism
- District: Nagapattinam
- Deity: Neelamegha Perumal (Vishnu); Thirukannapura Nayagi (Lakshmi); Sowriraja Perumal (Vishnu)

Location
- Location: Thirukannapuram, Thirumarugal Block
- State: Tamil Nadu
- Country: India
- Interactive map of Neelamegha Perumal Temple
- Coordinates: 10.8684°N 79.7042°E

Architecture
- Type: Dravidian architecture

The Neelamegha Perumal Temple or Sowriraja Perumal Temple is a Hindu temple in Thirukannapuram, a village in the outskirts of Nagapattinam in the South Indian state of Tamil Nadu, is dedicated to the Hindu god Vishnu. Constructed in the Dravidian style of architecture, the temple is glorified in the Divya Prabandha, the early medieval Tamil canon of the Alvar saints from the 6th–9th centuries CE. It is one of the 108 Divya Desam dedicated to Vishnu, who is worshipped as Neelamegha Perumal (also called as Neela Meghar) and his consort Lakshmi as Thirukannapura Nayagi. As per Hindu legend, the presiding deity is believed to have appeared with a wig (called sowri locally) to save a devotee, leading to the name Sowriraja Perumal (also called as Sowrirajan or Sowrirajar).

A granite wall surrounds the temple, enclosing all its shrines and three of its seven bodies of water. The temple has a seven-tiered rajagopuram, the temple's gateway tower and a huge temple tank in front of it. The temple is believed to have been built by the Cholas, with later additions from the Thanjavur Nayaks.

Six daily rituals and three yearly festivals are held at the temple, of which the chariot festival, celebrated during the Tamil month of Vaikasi (April–May), is the most prominent. The temple follows the Tenkalai mode of worship and is maintained and administered by the Hindu Religious and Endowment Board of the Government of Tamil Nadu.

== Legend ==
As per Hindu legend, Rangabhatta an ardent devotee and priest of the temple offered a garland to the presiding deity daily offered by a courtesan. The courtesan used to wear the garland before offering to the priest. One day, the ruling king found a hair in the garland asked the priest about it. The priest said that the hair was that of the deity himself. The king thought that priest was lying and wanted to punish him. While he checked the deity, Vishnu himself appeared with a sowri (wig). Since Vishnu appeared with Sowri, he is called Sowriraja Perumal in the temple.

As per Padma Purana, a king called Vasu (also known as Uparisravas), had the ability to fly. He was killing the demons who were troubling the masses. While flying over this place, he mistook some sages as demons and attacked them. Vishnu came in as a 16-year-old boy and defeated Vasu. It took a bit of time for Vasu to realise it was Vishnu who came in disguise. He prayed to Vishnu to marry his daughter Padmini. Pleased by his devotion, Vishnu agreed to marry Padmini.

== Architecture ==
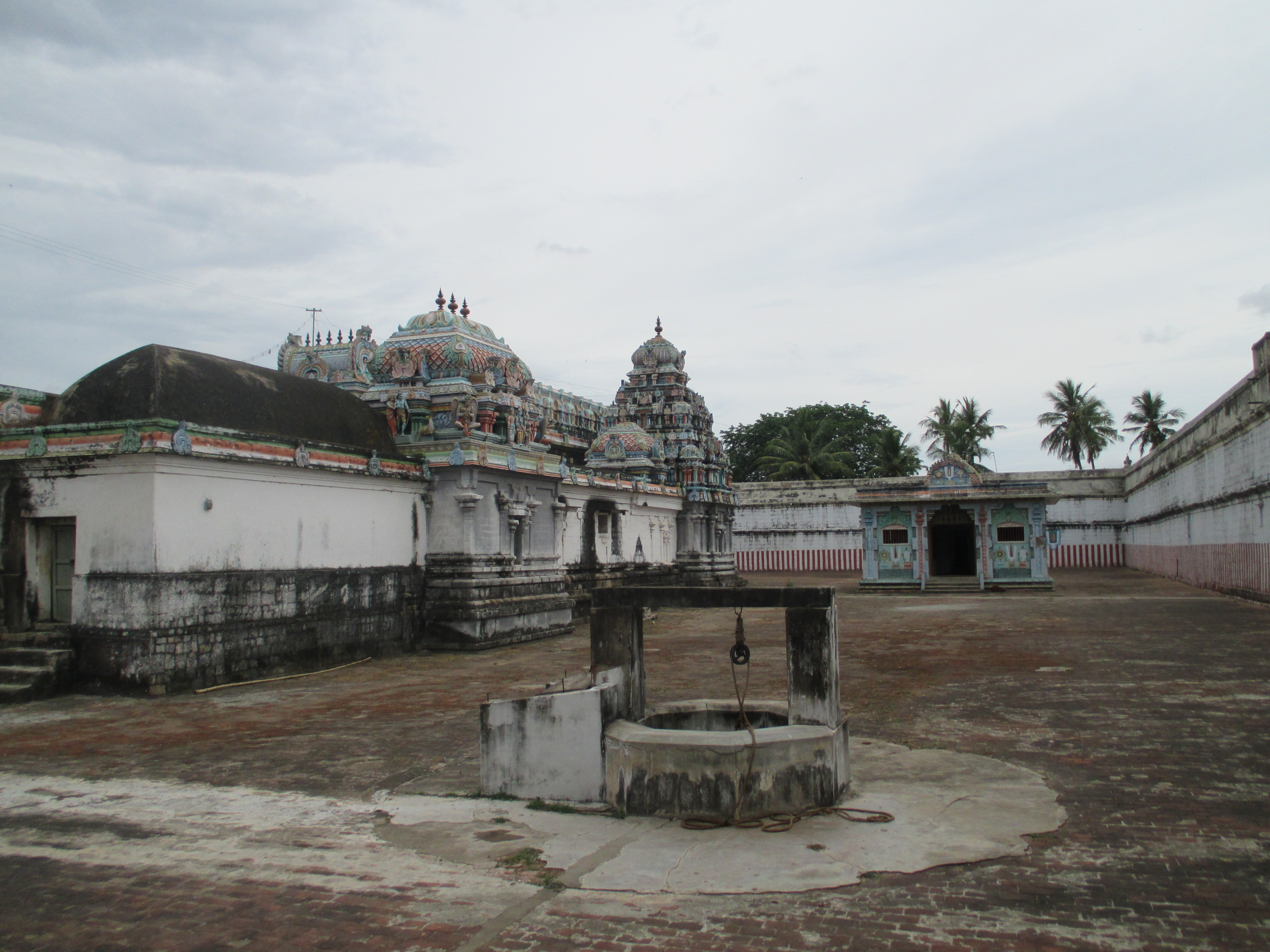
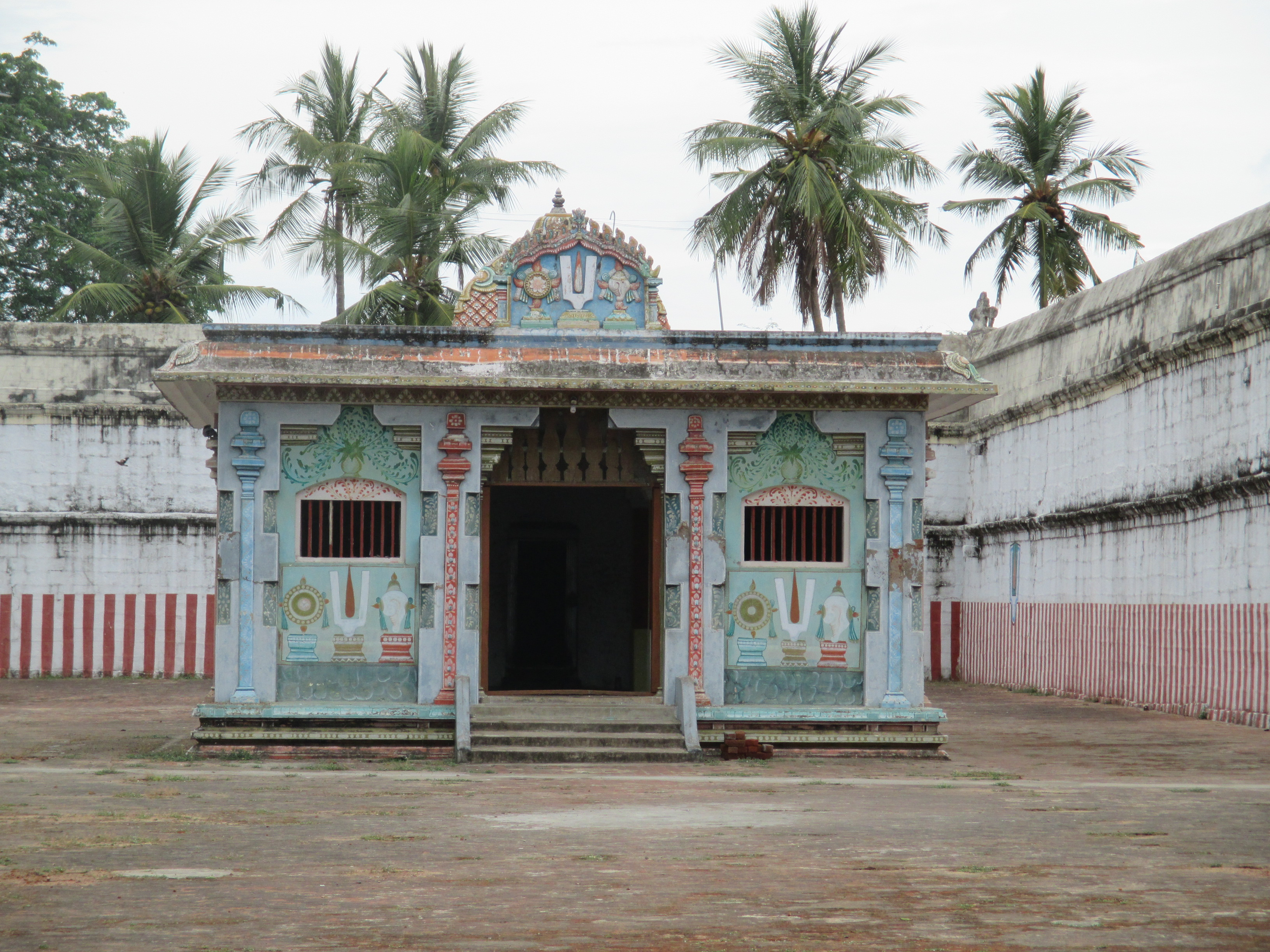
Shrines inside the temple

The temple has a seven-tier rajagopuram about 100 ft (30 m) and a vast temple complex measuring 1.5 acres (0.61 ha). The complex measures 316 ft (96 m) from East to West and 210 ft (64 m) from North to South. The second gateway tower, approached from the main gateway, measures 60 ft (18 m). The image of the presiding deity, Neela Meghar, is housed in the sanctum, which is approached through the gateways and the Mahamandapa. The sanctum also houses the image of Sridevi and Bhudevi on either side of Neela Meghar, Dandaka Maharishi and Garuda. The metal image of the festival deity, Sowriraja Perumal, is also housed in the sanctum, with four consorts namely Sridevi, Bhudevi, Padmini and Andal. There are also metal images of Santhana Krishnar and Chakrathaalvar. The temple tank is situated right opposite to the temple.

The hall preceding the sanctum is called Mahamandapa and the northern part of it is called Thirumanjana Mandapam, where sacred bath is performed to the festive images during festivals. The Palliarai is the sacred chamber where the festive images of Vishnu and his consort are housed during festivals. There are separate shrines for Senai Mudaliar (the general of Vishnu's forces), Nardhana Krishna, the twelve Alvars, Rama, Consort of presiding deity and Thaylapura Nayagi. There are four temple tanks associated with the temple, with the largest, Nityapushkarani, located opposite the temple measuring 450 ft (140 m) by 415 ft (126 m). Ksheerapati Pushkarani, Bhootavadan and Muthakaram are other three tanks of the temple.

As per a legend, the original structure extended up to seven compounds and 13 miles leading to the seashore. The ruling Chola ruler, was against Vaishnavism and wanted to destroy the temple. An ardent devotee pleaded to Vishnu to appear and destroy the ruler. Vishnu was unmoved and in anger, the devotee threw a discus at the image, creating a scar. It is believed that the scar is seen in the image even during modern times. The presiding deity threw a discus to hurl the Chola forces. The image of the presiding deity is depicted hurling a discus.

In modern times, the temple is maintained and administered by the Hindu Religious and Endowment Board of the Government of Tamil Nadu.

== Religious significance ==
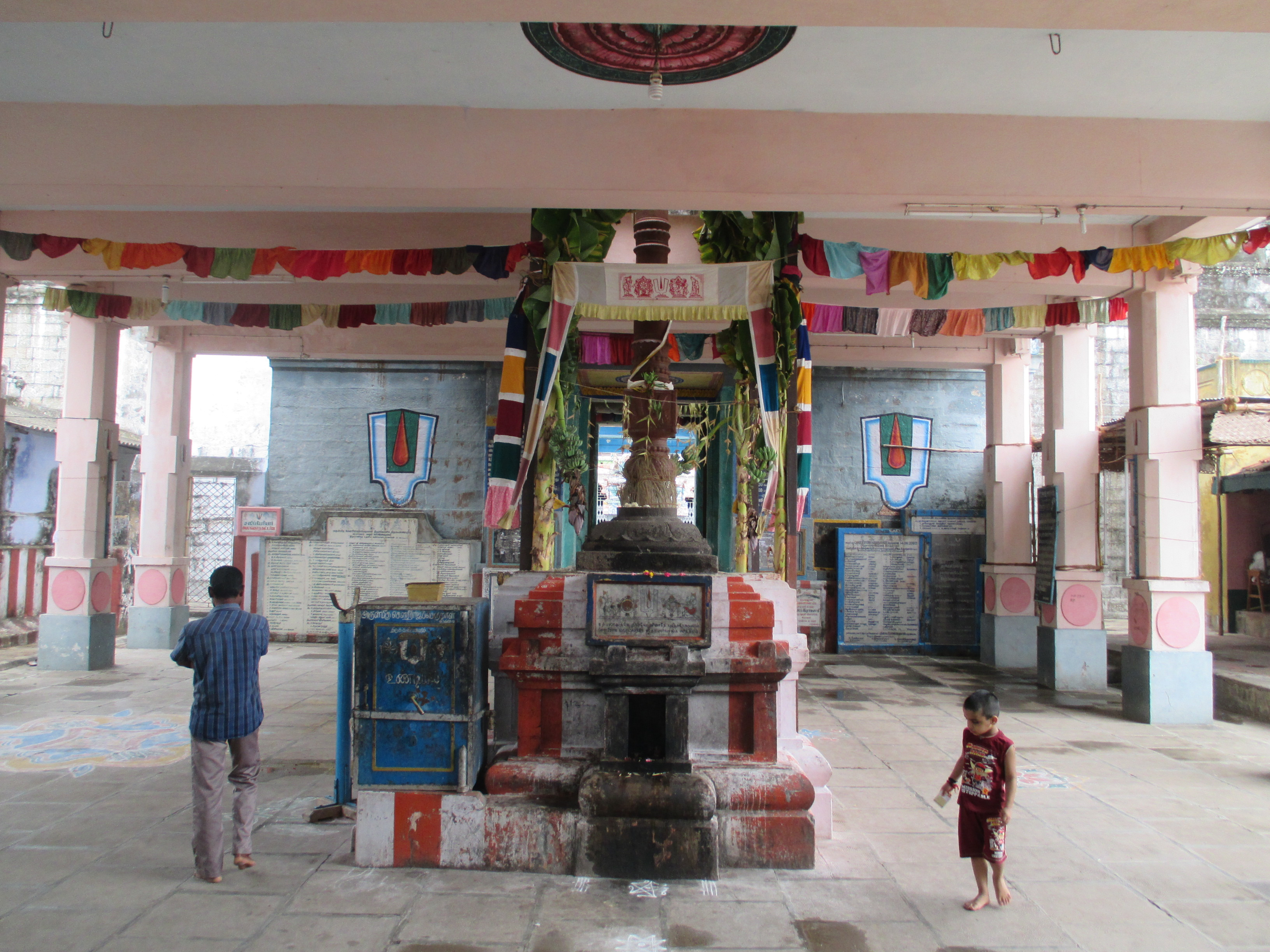
Image of flag staff near the main entrance

The temple is revered in Nalayira Divya Prabandham, the 7th–9th century Vaishnava canon, by Periyalvar, Andal, Kulasekara Alvar, Nammalvar and Thirumangai Alvar. The temple is classified as a Divya Desam, one of the 108 Vishnu temples that are mentioned in the book. The temple is next only to Srirangam Ranganathaswamy temple in terms of number of hymns dedicated to the presiding deity in Nalayira Divya Prabandam. The temple is also mentioned in 108 Tirupathi Anthathi by Divya Kavi Pillai Perumal Aiyangar. A work by T.S. Rajagopalan on Thirukannapuram glorifies the features of the temple.

Pancha Kannan Temples
Loganatha Perumal Temple	Thirukannangudi
Gajendra Varadha Temple	Kabisthalam
Neelamegha Perumal Temple	Thirukannapuram
Bhaktavatsala Perumal Temple	Thirukannamangai
Ulagalantha Perumal Temple	Thirukkovilur

This temple is one of the Panchakanna (Krishnaranya) Kshetrams and considered the foremost among the five temples. Kannan refers to Krishna, the avatar of Vishnu, while pancha means five and Kshetrams refers to holy places. Four of the five temples are situated in Chola Nadu, in modern times, in the region surrounding Kumbakonam and Nagapattinam and one of them in Nadu Nadu. There are five similar temples located in North India, called Pancha-dvarakas. Krishna is not the presiding deity in any of the temples. The processional deity, Krishna, led to the derivation of the names of these places. Sage Kanva is believed to have worshiped the presiding deity.

Thirukannapuram is one among the eight temples including Tirupathi, Srirangam, Srimushnam, Naguneri, Saligram, Pushkar and Padarikashram that are considered the eight holy centres of salvation in Vaishanavism. They are believed to stand for the Ashtakshara mantra of "Om Namo Narayanaya", with each centre representing a letter each. The temple is the place where Vishnu is believed to have represented himself in all the eight forms, the combination of all the eight temples. The temple is also called Bhuloka Vaikuntham.

== Festivals and religious practices ==
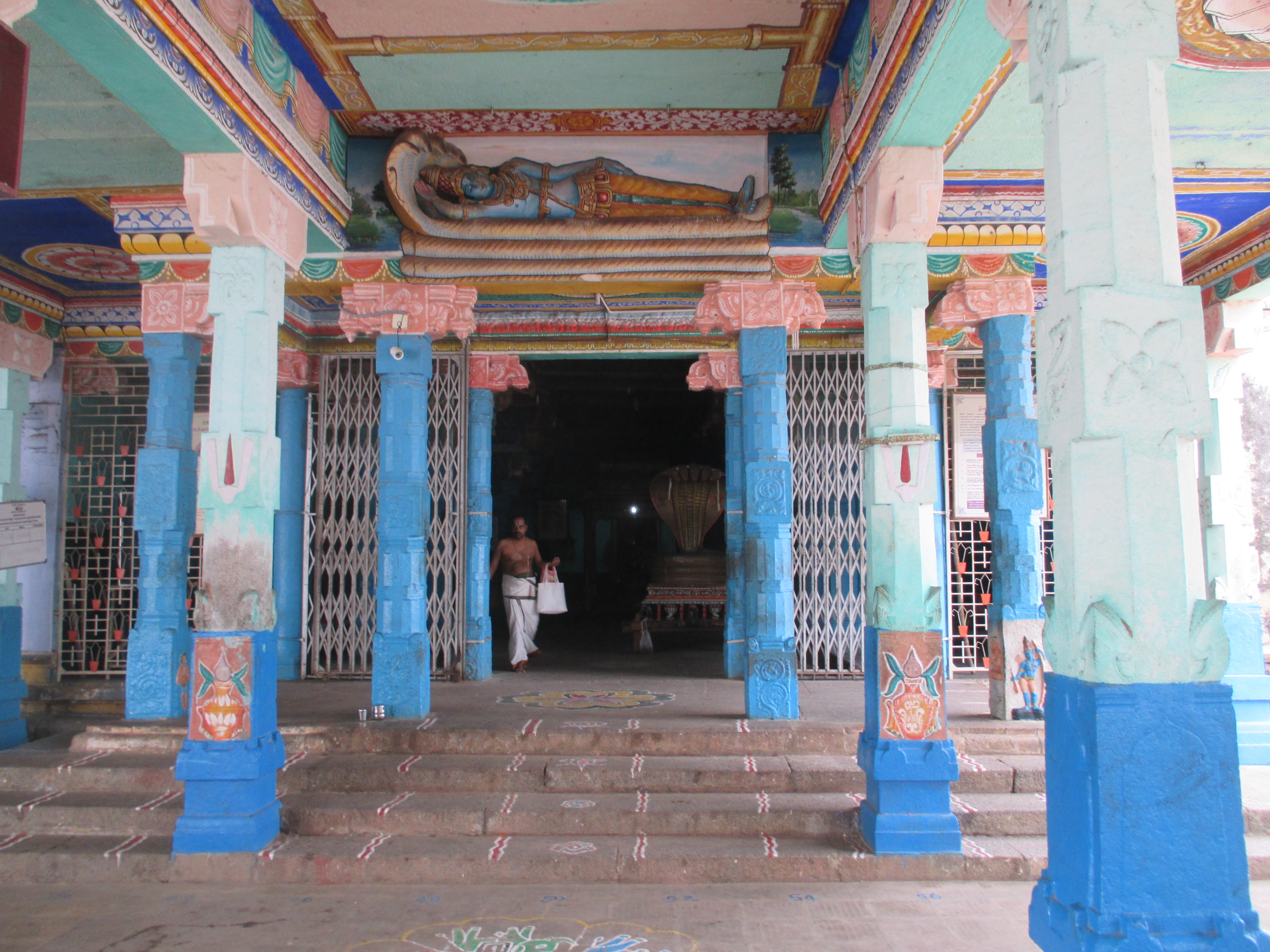
Image of pillared hall

The temple priests perform the pooja (rituals) during festivals and on a daily basis based on Vaiksana Agama. As at other Vishnu temples of Tamil Nadu, the priests belong to the Vaishnavaite community, a Brahmin sub-caste. The temple rituals are performed six times a day: Ushathkalam at 7 a.m., Kalasanthi at 8:00 a.m., Uchikalam at 12:00 p.m., Sayarakshai at 6:00 p.m., Irandamkalam at 7:00 p.m. and Ardha Jamam at 10:00 p.m. Each ritual has three steps: alangaram (decoration), neivethanam (food offering) and deepa aradanai (waving of lamps) for both Neelamegha Perumal and Tirukannapura Nayagi. During the last step of worship, nagaswaram (pipe instrument) and tavil (percussion instrument) are played, religious instructions in the Vedas (sacred text) are recited by priests, and worshippers prostrate themselves in front of the temple mast. There are weekly, fortnightly, and monthly rituals performed in the temple.

The major festival, the twelve-day Brahmotsavam is celebrated during the Tamil month of Vaikasi (April - May). Masi Mahotsavam is another ten-day festival during the Tamil month of Masi (February - March). During these festivals the legend of marriage of Padmasini with Sowrirarjan is enacted. As per the legend, Uparasiravasu, the ruler of fisherman community was trying to remove grains from a storehouse, when a watchman intercepted. Later during the day, the same watchman appeared as Vishnu to the ruler. He was pleased and got his daughter Padmasini married to Vishnu. The festive idol is so depicted to render a hand to his consort. During the festival, sacred water used during the ablution of the festive deities is distributed to devotees. There are religious discourses, musical performances and floats organized during the festival. The other Vaishnavite festivals like Krishna Janmashtami, Karthigai, Tamil New Year, Margali ten-day festival, Sankranti, Panguni Uttiram and Rohini Utsavam are celebrated.

== Food offering ==
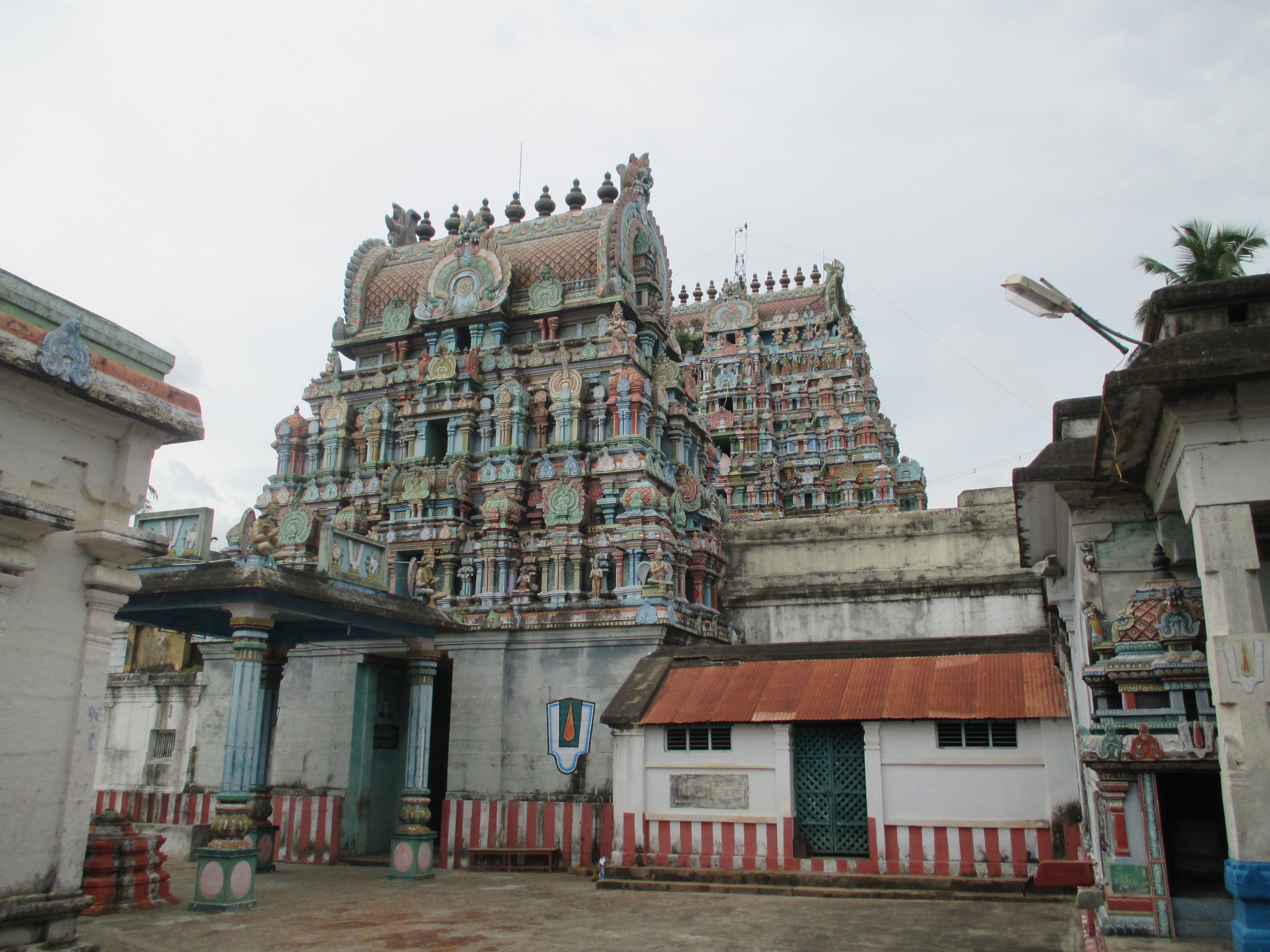
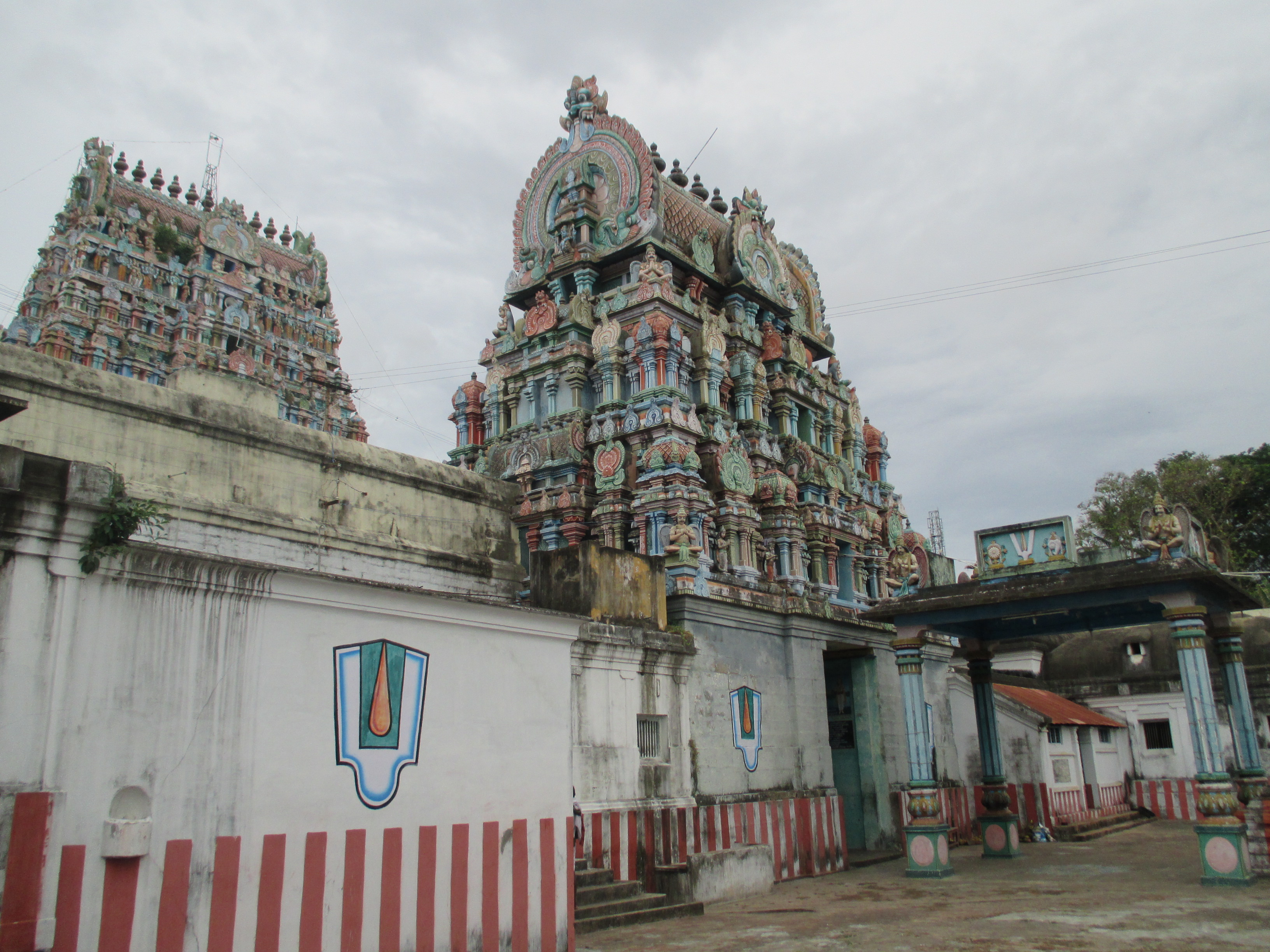
Gopurams inside the temple

Muna Yodhran Pongal is a traditional food offered to the deity every night during the last Pooja. There are two legends associated with it. According to one of them, a devotee by name Munayodharan offered the dish made of rice, lentil and ghee to Vishnu everyday in the temple. During one night, he could not offer and he felt for it. Vishnu was pleased by his devotion and appeared to him in his house during the night. Bells were ringing, lights were glowing and a path was defined from his house to the temple where smell of his offering was appearing all the way. According to another legend, Muniyodharan Pillai, a Chola feudatory was bestowed with the responsibility of collecting taxes in the region. He was a great devotee of Vishnu and stayed in Thirukannapuram. During the torrential flood, he spent all the amount collected for the welfare of the people. The king was displeased and he arrested Muniyodharan. Viraghadibhogam was a maiden that held Muniyodharan in high esteem and she pleaded with god Vishnu. Vishnu appeared in the dreams of the king and ordered him to release Muniyodharan. It is believed Viraghadibhogam offered Pongal to Vishnu and hence it came to be known as Muniyodharan Pongal.

== See also ==
- Divya Desams

== Photogallery ==
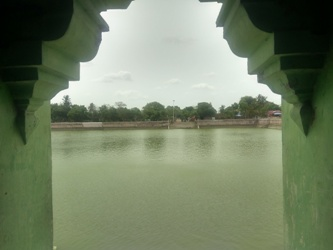
Temple tank

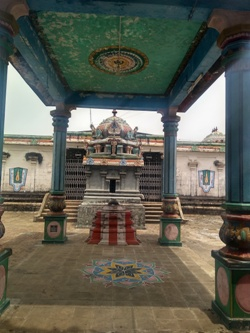
Front mandapa

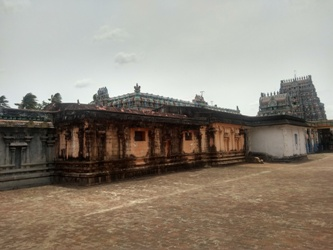
Prakara

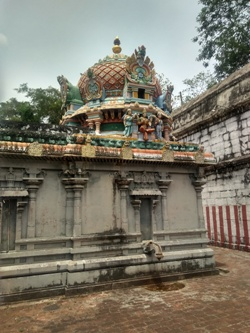
Vimana of goddess

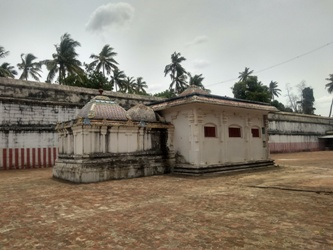
Prakara

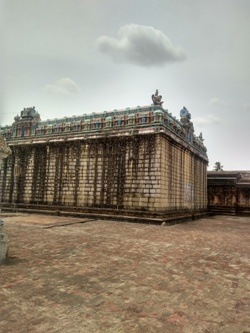
Prakara

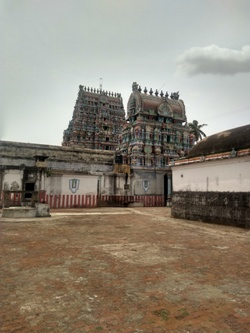
gopuras
