= Gajendra Varadha Temple =

Hindu temple in Thanjavur

Gajendra Varadha Perumal Temple
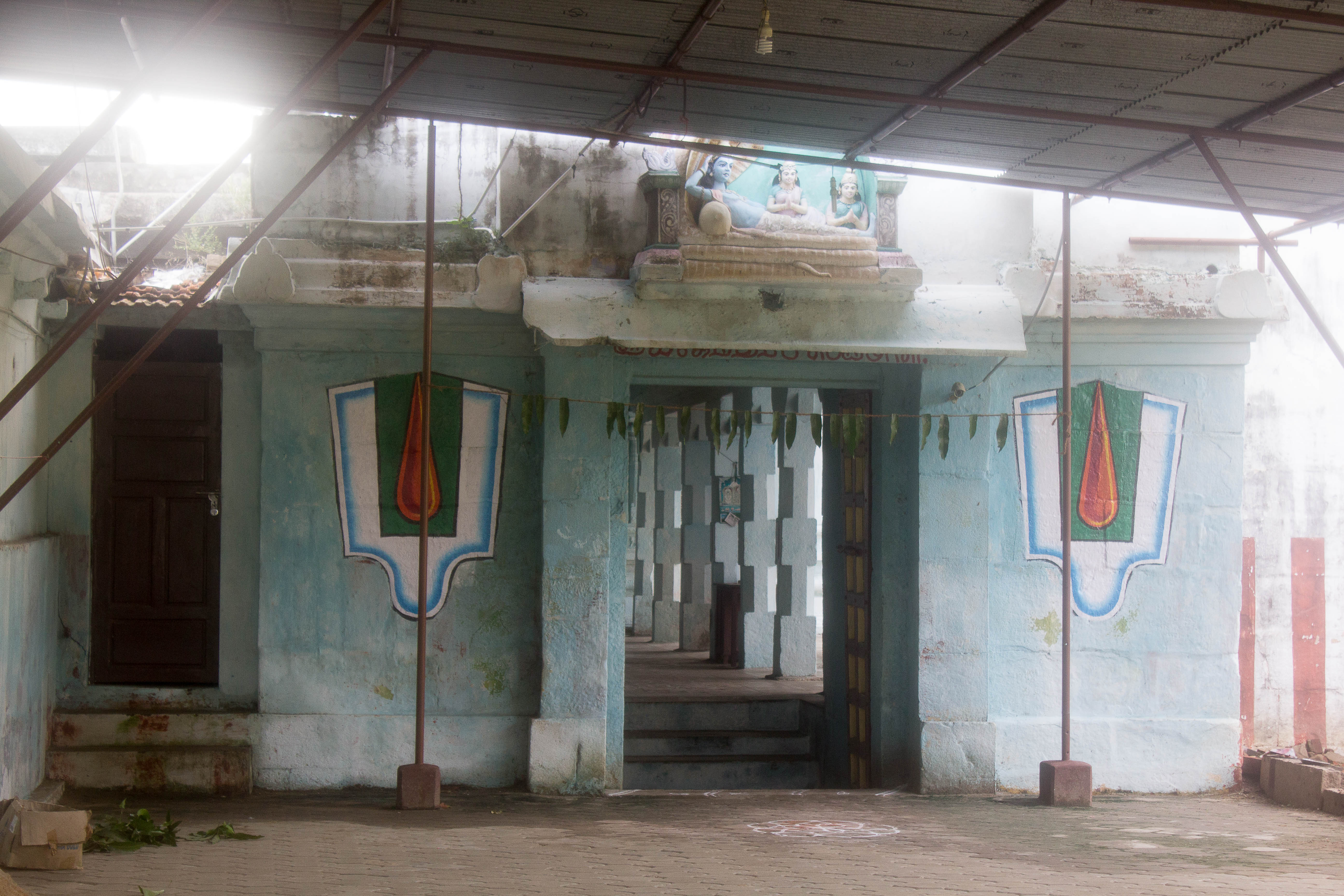

- Location in Tamil Nadu

Religion
- Affiliation: Hinduism
- District: Thanjavur
- Deity: Gajendra Varadha Perumal (Vishnu); Ramamanivalli Thayar (Lakshmi)
- Features: Tower: Gajanakriti; Temple tank: Gajendra, Kapila

Location
- Location: Kabisthalam
- State: Tamil Nadu
- Country: India
- Interactive map of Gajendra Varadha Perumal Temple
- Coordinates: 10°56′43″N 79°16′31″E

Architecture
- Type: Dravidian architecture

The Gajendra Varadha Perumal Temple in Thirukkavithalam, a village in the outskirts of Papanasam in the South Indian state of Tamil Nadu, is dedicated to the Hindu god Vishnu. Constructed in the Dravidian style of architecture, the temple is glorified in the Nalayira Divya Prabandham, the early medieval Tamil canon of the Alvar saints from the 6th–9th centuries CE. It is one of the 108 Divya Desams dedicated to Vishnu, who is worshipped as Gajendra Varadha Perumal and his consort Lakshmi as Ramamanivalli. The temple is one of the five Pancha-Kannan temples, where Krishna, an avatar of Vishnu is given prominence over the presiding deity.

The temple is believed to have been built by the Medieval Cholas of the late 9th century CE, with later contributions from Vijayanagara kings and Madurai Nayaks. A granite wall surrounds the temple, enclosing all its shrines and its bodies of water.

Gajendra Varada is believed to have appeared to Gajendra the elephant also called Indrajumnan, the crocodile called Kuhu, Sage Parasara, and Anjaneya. Six daily rituals and four yearly festivals are held at the temple, of which the Gajendra Moksha Lila, celebrated during the Tamil month of Aadi (July–August), is the most prominent. The temple is maintained and administered by the Hindu Religious and Endowment Board of the Government of Tamil Nadu.

== Legend ==
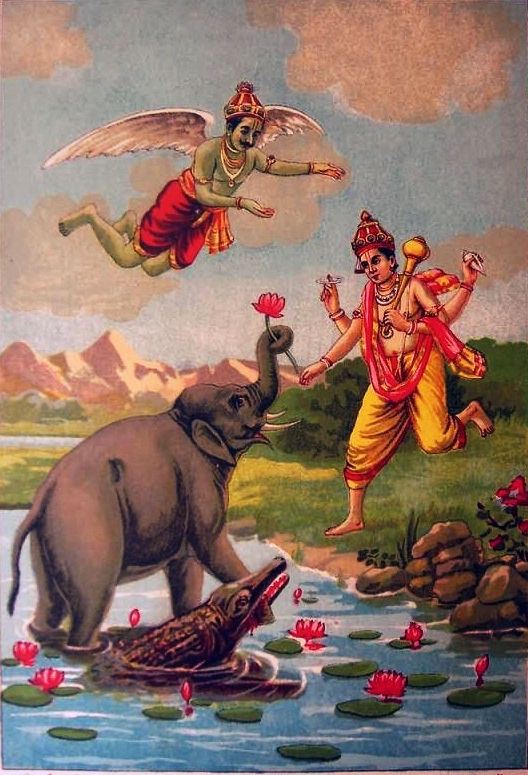
Image indicating Gajendra Moksha

As per Hindu legend, King Indrajuman, who immersed himself in the worship of Vishnu, failed to strengthen his army and lost his kingdom. While doing worship, he also did not observe the sage Durvasa (some sources claim it as Agastya) who went along his way. The sage got irritated and cursed the king to be born as an elephant in his next birth. The king apologized to the sage for his negligence, and moved by his innocence, the sage wished that he would continue to be a Vishnu devotee as an elephant and that Vishnu would bestow him goodwill. There was a gandharva by the name of Kuhu in the temple tank at this place, who troubled all who bathed in the tank, he was cursed by a sage to be born as a crocodile in this birth. The elephant Gajendra continued as a Vishnu devotee and while drinking water from the temple tank, his leg was grabbed by the crocodile. The elephant cried in rescue calling the name "Adimulam" and Vishnu sent his discus to fend off the crocodile. Both the elephant and crocodile returned to their human form by the grace of Vishnu. Since Vishnu heard the calling of his devotee he appeared to save the elephant Gajendra, he came to be known as Gajendara Varadar. Hanuman, the vanara lieutenant of Rama, (avatar of Vishnu) also worshiped Vishnu at this place and hence the place came to be known as Kabisthalam (kabi in Tamil indicated monkey).

== Temple ==
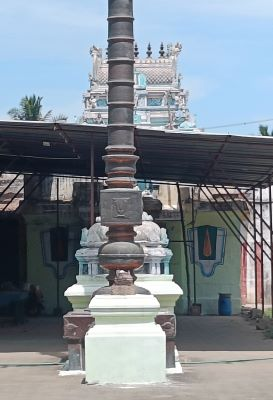
Gopura

The temple is located in Kabisthalam, a village situated 3 km (1.9 mi) away from Papanasam and around 20 km (12 mi) away from Kumbakonam and Thanjavur, towns in the South Indian state of Tamil Nadu. The village is located in between the two rivers Kaveri and Kollidam. The temple is believed to have been built by the Medieval Cholas of the late 8th century CE, with later contributions from Vijayanagar kings and Madurai Nayaks. A brick wall surrounds the temple, enclosing all its shrines and bodies of water. The temple has a five-tier rajagopuram and a single precinct. The prime deity, Gajendra Varadar is enshrined in the sanctum, in a reclining posture, called Bhujanga sayanam. The vimana (roof above the sanctum) is called Ganganakrutha Vimanam. There is a separate shrine for Ramanavalli, located to the right of the sanctum. There are separate shrines for Yoga Narasimhar, Sudarsana, Garuda and the Alvars in the first sanctum. The main temple tank is Gajendra Pushkarani and there is another tank called Kapila Theertham, located inside the temple complex.

== Festivals and religious practices ==
The temple priests perform the pooja (rituals) during festivals and on a daily basis. As at other Vishnu temples of Tamil Nadu, the priests belong to the Vaishnavaite community, from the Brahmin varna. The temple rituals are performed six times a day: Ushathkalam at 7 a.m., Kalasanthi at 8:00 a.m., Uchikalam at 12:00 p.m., Sayarakshai at 6:00 p.m., Irandamkalam at 7:00 p.m. and Ardha Jamam at 8:00 p.m. Each ritual has three steps: alangaram (decoration), neivethanam (food offering) and deepa aradanai (waving of lamps) for both Gajendra Varadhan and Ramanavalli. During the last step of worship, nadasvaram (pipe instrument) and tavil (percussion instrument) are played, religious instructions in the Vedas (sacred text) are recited by priests, and worshippers prostrate themselves in front of the temple mast. There are weekly, monthly and fortnightly rituals performed in the temple. The Gajendra Moksha Leela celebrated in the Tamil month of Adi (July–August), Chariot festival during the Tamil month of Vaikasi (May–June) on Visakam star and Brahmmotsavam are the major festivals celebrated in the temple, along with all Vishnu related festivals.

== Religious Significance ==
Pancha Kannan Temples
Loganatha Perumal Temple	Thirukannangudi
Gajendra Varadha Temple	Kabisthalam
Neelamegha Perumal Temple	Thirukannapuram
Bhaktavatsala Perumal Temple	Thirukannamangai
Ulagalantha Perumal Temple	Thirukkovilur

The temple is revered in Nalayira Divya Prabandham, the 7th–9th century Vaishnava canon, by Tirumalisai Alvar in one hymn. The temple is classified as a Divya Desams, one of the 108 Vishnu temples that are mentioned in the book. Since there is only a passing mention about the place in the verse, it was earlier not clear on whether the verse refers to the temple. But it has been concluded that the verse "Aatrankarai Kidakkum Kannan" meaning the Lord on the banks of the river refers to Gajendra Varadar in this place. Religious scholars consider this place is a unique Vishnu temple as he descended to rescue to an animal, while he appeared in all other places to rescue sages, celestial bodies or demons.

This temple is one of the Panchakanna (Krishnaranya) Kshetrams. Kannan refers to Krishna, the avatar of Vishnu, while pancha means five and Kshetrams refers to holy places. Four of the five temples are situated in Chola Nadu, in modern times, in the region surrounding Kumbakonam and Nagapattinam and one of them in Nadu Nadu. There are five similar temples located in North India, called Pancha-dvarakas. Krishna is not the presiding deity in any of the temples. The processional deity, Krishna, led to the derivation of the names of these places. In Kabisthalam, Kannan is referred as "reclining Lord in the river banks".
