= Ramanathaswami Temple, Tiruvarur =

Shiva temple in Tiruvarur district in Tamil Nadu

- Ramanathaswamy Temple, Thirukannapuram, Tiruvarur, Tamil Nadu

Religion
- Affiliation: Hinduism
- District: Tiruvarur
- Deity: Ramanathaswamy
- Festival: Maha Shivaratri

Location
- Location: Thirukannapuram
- State: Tamil Nadu
- Country: India
- Coordinates: 10°52′11.3″N 79°42′30.2″E

Architecture
- Type: Dravidian architecture

Specifications
- Temple: One
- Inscriptions: available
- Elevation: 30.21 m (99 ft)

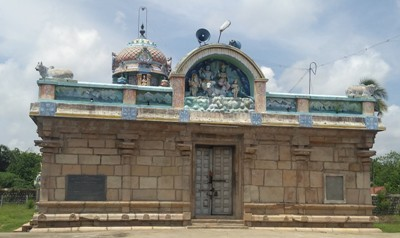
Ramanathaswami Temple

Ramanathaswami Temple (Tamil: திருக்கண்ணபுரம் இராமனதீசுவரர் கோயில்) is a Hindu temple located at Thirukannapuram in the Tiruvarur district of Tamil Nadu, India. Dedicated to Shiva, the temple is located in the village of Tirukannapuram between Tiruvarur and Mayiladuthurai. The historical name of the place is Ramanatheeswaram. The presiding deity is Shiva. He is called as Ramanathaswami. His consort is known as Sarivarkuzhali.

== Significance ==
The temple is associated with Rama who is believed to have worshipped Shiva at Tirukannapuram along with Rameswaram to absolve him of the sin of killing Ravana.

The temple has been praised by Sambandar in the Thevaram. The temple is frequented by people seeking relief from sins committed by them.

It is one of the shrines of the 275 Paadal Petra Sthalams - Shiva Sthalams.

== Gallery ==
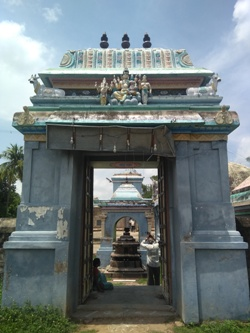
Entrance

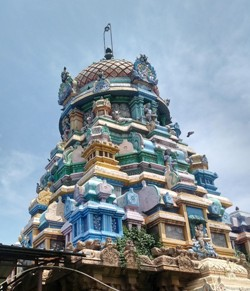
Vimana of the presiding deity

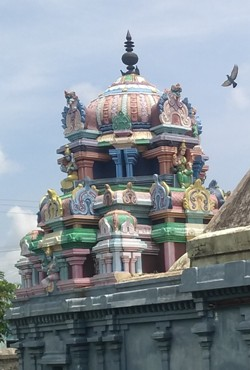
Vimana of the Goddess
