= Thirukannapuram =

- Village
- Thirukannapuram, Nagapattinam, (Tamil Nadu) Thirukannapuram (India)
- Coordinates: 10°52′07.0″N 79°42′14.8″E
- Country: India
- State: Tamil Nadu
- District: Nagattinam
- Elevation: 32.7 m (107 ft)

Language
  - Official: Tamil
- Time zone: UTC+5:30 (IST)

Thirukannapuram is a village in the Indian state of Tamil Nadu, Nagapattinam District. A popular Perumal temple (Neelamegha Perumal temple) is there. During the Tamil month of Masi (mid of February to March) 'Masi magam' festival is conducted greatly.

== Temples ==
- Neelamegha Perumal Temple (Divya Desams)
- Ramanadheeswarar Temple (Paadal Petra Sthalam)
