= Kabisthalam =

Village in Tamil Nadu, India

Kapisthalam
- Village
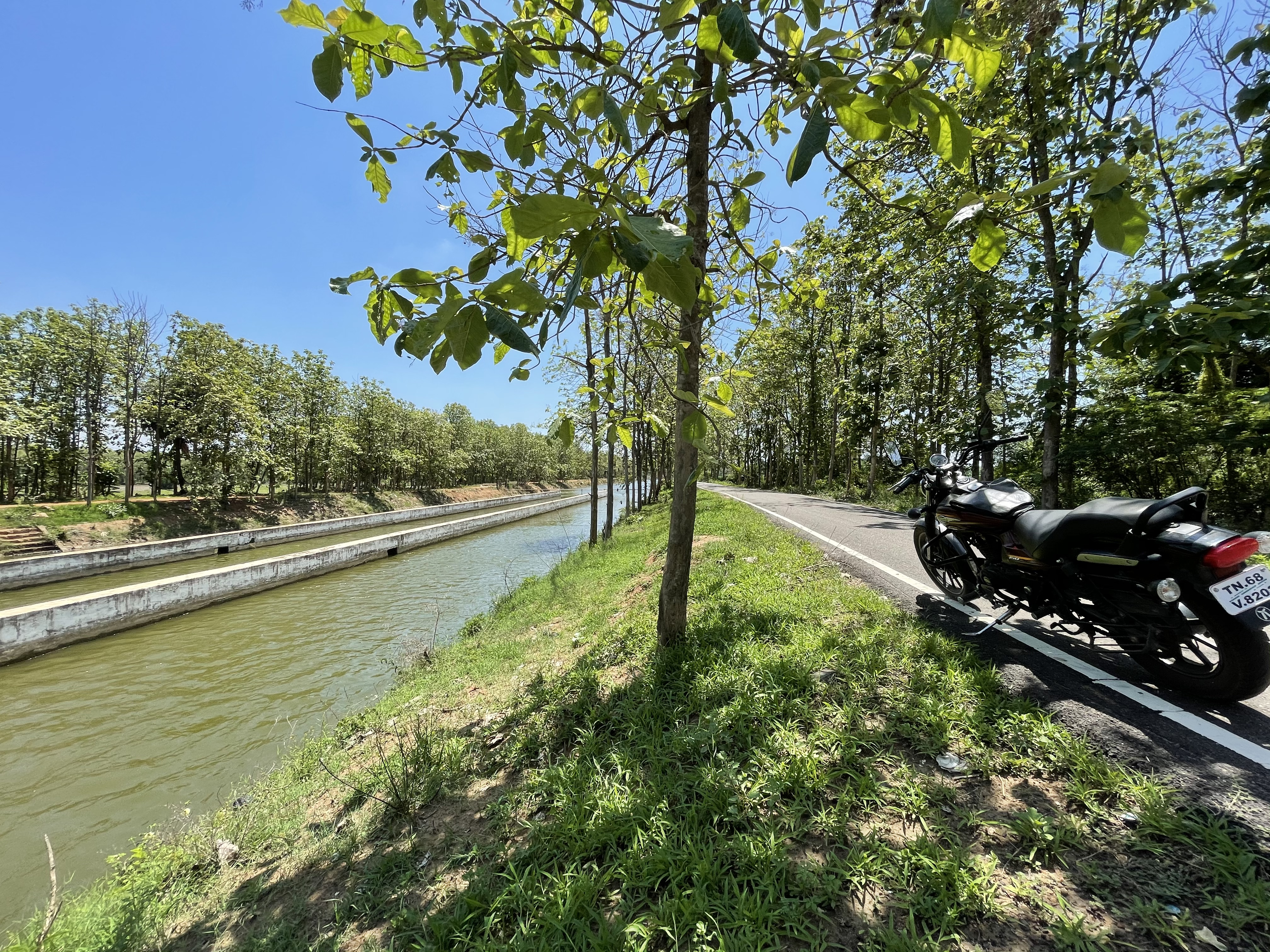
- River kaveri distributaries
- Interactive map of Kapisthalam
- Coordinates: 10.9486°N 79.2645°E\
- Country: India
- State: Tamil Nadu
- District: Thanjavur

Population
  - Total: 7,300

Languages
  - Official: Tamil
- Time zone: UTC+5:30 (IST)
- Postal code: 614203
- Telephone code: 91-4374

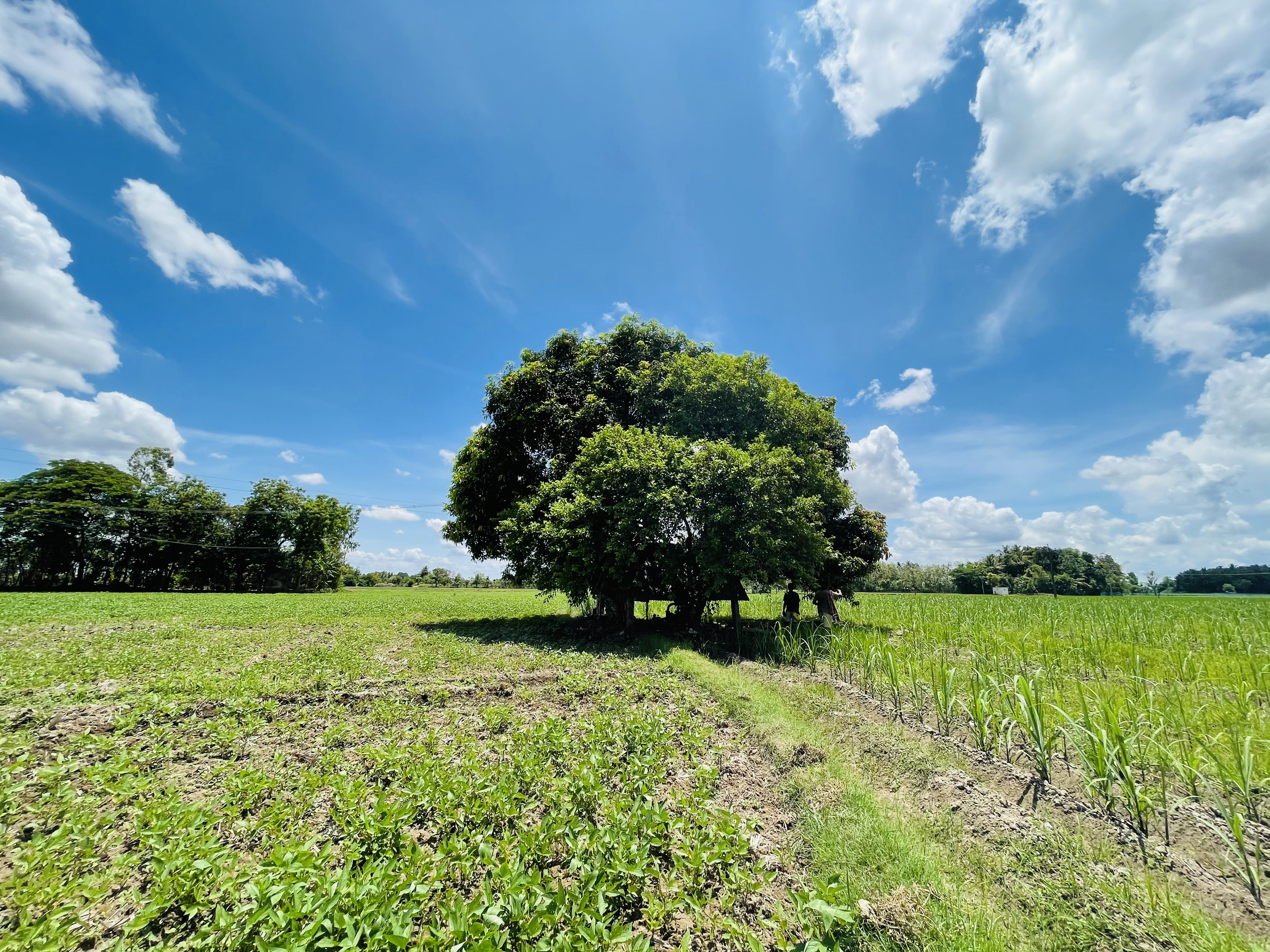
Paddy fields in Kabisthalam

Kabisthalam is a village under Papanasam taluk in Thanjavur district in Tamil Nadu. Tracing out the Vedic history Thiru Kavithalam was the original name for the place. However, the name changed to Kabisthalam during medieval ages. It is located on the bank of river Cauvery, 14 kilometres (8.7 mi) from Kumbakonam, 2 kilometres (1.2 mi) from Papanasam and 17 kilometres (11 mi) from Thiruvaiyaru. It is the birthplace of Indian National Congress leader G. K. Moopanar.

Agriculture is the main occupation in this village. The main crops are rice, sugarcane, and vegetables. The village derives its name from the Gajendra Varadha Temple located in it. It is located in between Kallanai Poombhuhar state highway. Gajendra Varadha temple is one of the pilgrimage sites (38th Divyasthala).
