= Vaseeswarar Temple =

- Thirupasoor Temple
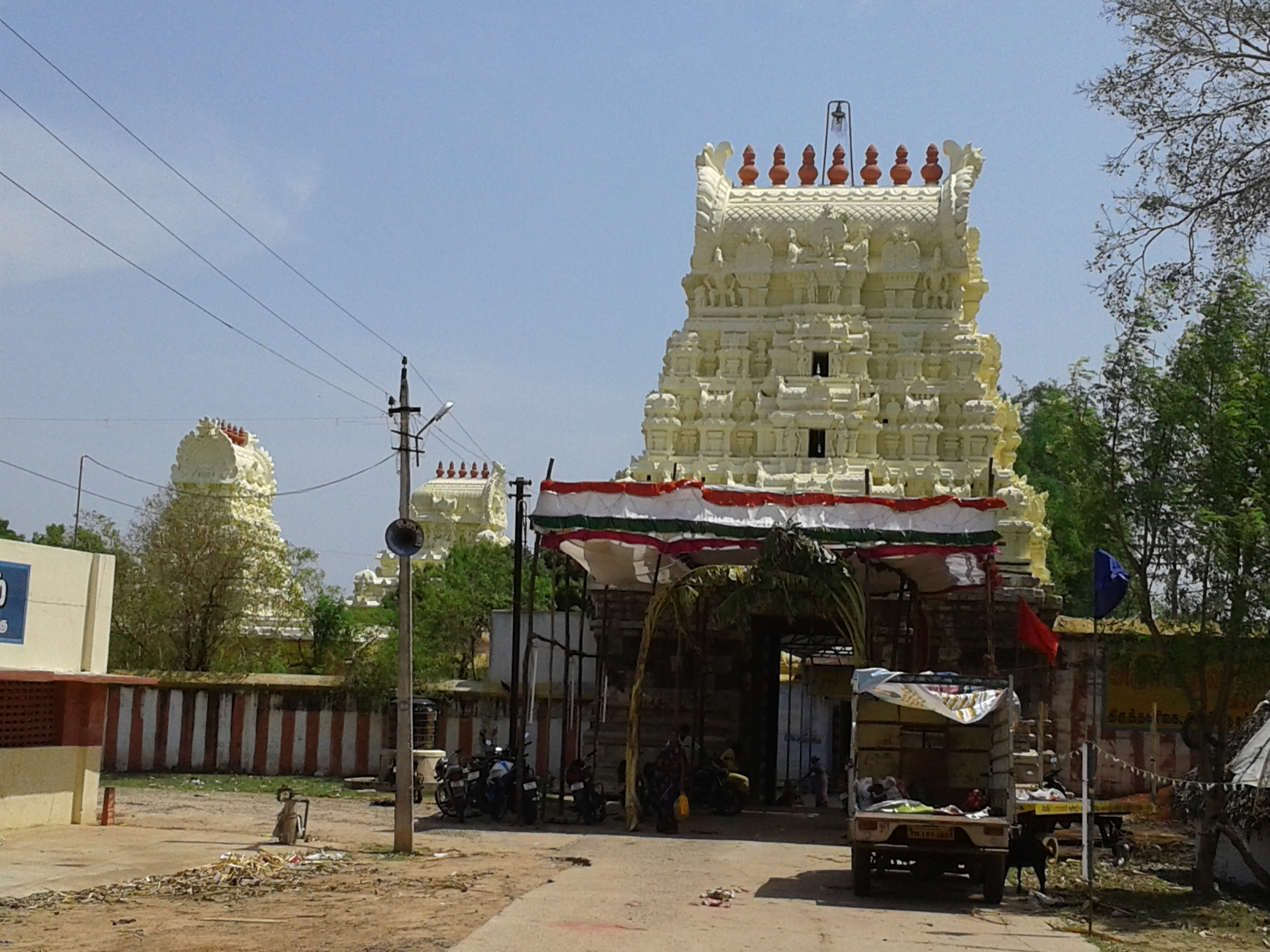

- Location in Tamil Nadu

Religion
- Affiliation: Hinduism
- District: Tiruvallur
- Deity: Vaseeswarar (Shiva)

Location
- State: Tamil Nadu
- Country: India
- Coordinates: 13°08′27″N 79°52′34″E

Architecture
- Type: Chola architecture

Vaseeswarar Temple (also called Pasoornathar Temple, Thirupasoor temple) is a Hindu temple to the deity Shiva in Thirupasoor, a village in Tiruvallur district in the Indian state of Tamil Nadu. Shiva is worshiped as Vaseeswarar, and is represented by the lingam. His consort Parvati is depicted as Pasupathinayagi. The temple is on the southern bank of Poondi reservoir on the Thiruvallur - Thiruthani road, 5 km (3.1 mi) away from the town. The presiding deity is mentioned in the 7th-century CE Tamil Saiva canonical work, the Tevaram, and is classified as Paadal Petra Sthalam.

The temple complex covers an area of one acre and all its shrines are enclosed with concentric rectangular walls. The temple has a number of shrines, with those of Vaseeswarar, his consort Pasupathi Nayaki and that of Murugan being the most prominent.

The original complex is believed to have been built by Cholas, while the present masonry structure was built during the 16th century. In modern times, the temple is maintained and administered by the Hindu Religious and Charitable Endowments Department of the Government of Tamil Nadu.

== Legend ==
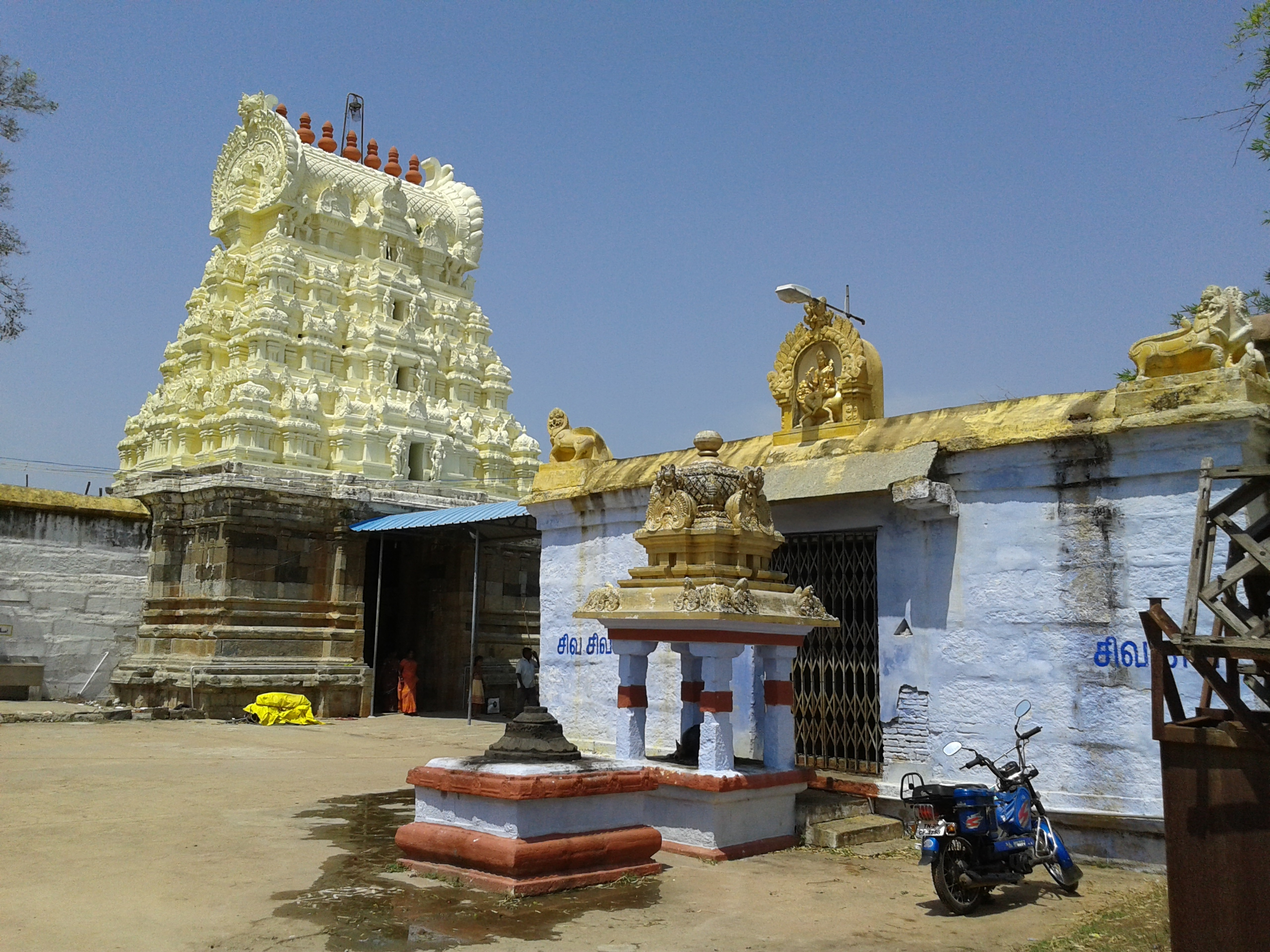
The main entrance as viewed from the first precinct

As per Hindu legend, the place was once a bamboo forest. A cow at this place was pouring it milk on a mound in an elevated place. The shepherd informed the king about the event and the king dug the place with a tool called Vasi. Blood was oozing out of the place and the king and the troops were taken aback. The enemies left a pot of snakes and a snake charmer came and rescued the king. Shiva appeared in the dreams of the king that night and informed him that the snake charmer was none other than Shiva himself. The king was much pleased and built a temple housing the Linga found in the place. The tilted feature of the image in the temple is believed to have been caused by the tool Vasi.

Another legend is that once, while Vishnu and Brahma contested for superiority, Shiva appeared as a flame, and challenged them to find his source. Brahma took the form of a swan, and flew to the sky to see the top of the flame, while Vishnu became the boar Varaha, and sought its base. The scene is called lingothbava, and is represented in the western wall at the sanctum of most Shiva temples. Neither Brahma nor Vishnu could find the source, and while Vishnu conceded his defeat, Brahma lied and said he had found the pinnacle. In punishment, Shiva ordained that Brahma would never have temples on earth in his worship. Thazhambu, the flower which was helping Brahma, was also punished for lying about Shiva. The flower was cursed that it won't be used during the worship of Shiva, but an exception was given during Shivaratri festival in the temple.

== History ==
The original complex is believed to have been built by Cholas, while the present masonry structure was built during the 16th century. There are inscriptions from later Chola emperors like Rajaraja Chola I (985–1014 CE), Kulothunga Chola I (1070–1120 CE) and Rajendra Chola III (1246–1279 CE). The first among the five inscriptions is the one on the northern wall of the sanctum indicating an agreement between Rajadhirajadeva and the temple priest with regards to the temple service. The second one is a broken inscription on the Western wall indicating grant of paddy to the temple by a private party during the third regnal year of Kulothunga Chola I (1070-1122 CE). Another inscription on the same wall indicates a gift during his fourth regnal year. The third recorded inscription on the same wall is during the reign of Raja Raja Chola I (985-1014 CE). The last inscription on the Western wall of the temple accounts the grants made for the perpetual lighting of the temple made during the reign of Sri Kulothunga Chola Deva, which could have been done during either of the Kulothunga Cholas.

== Architecture ==
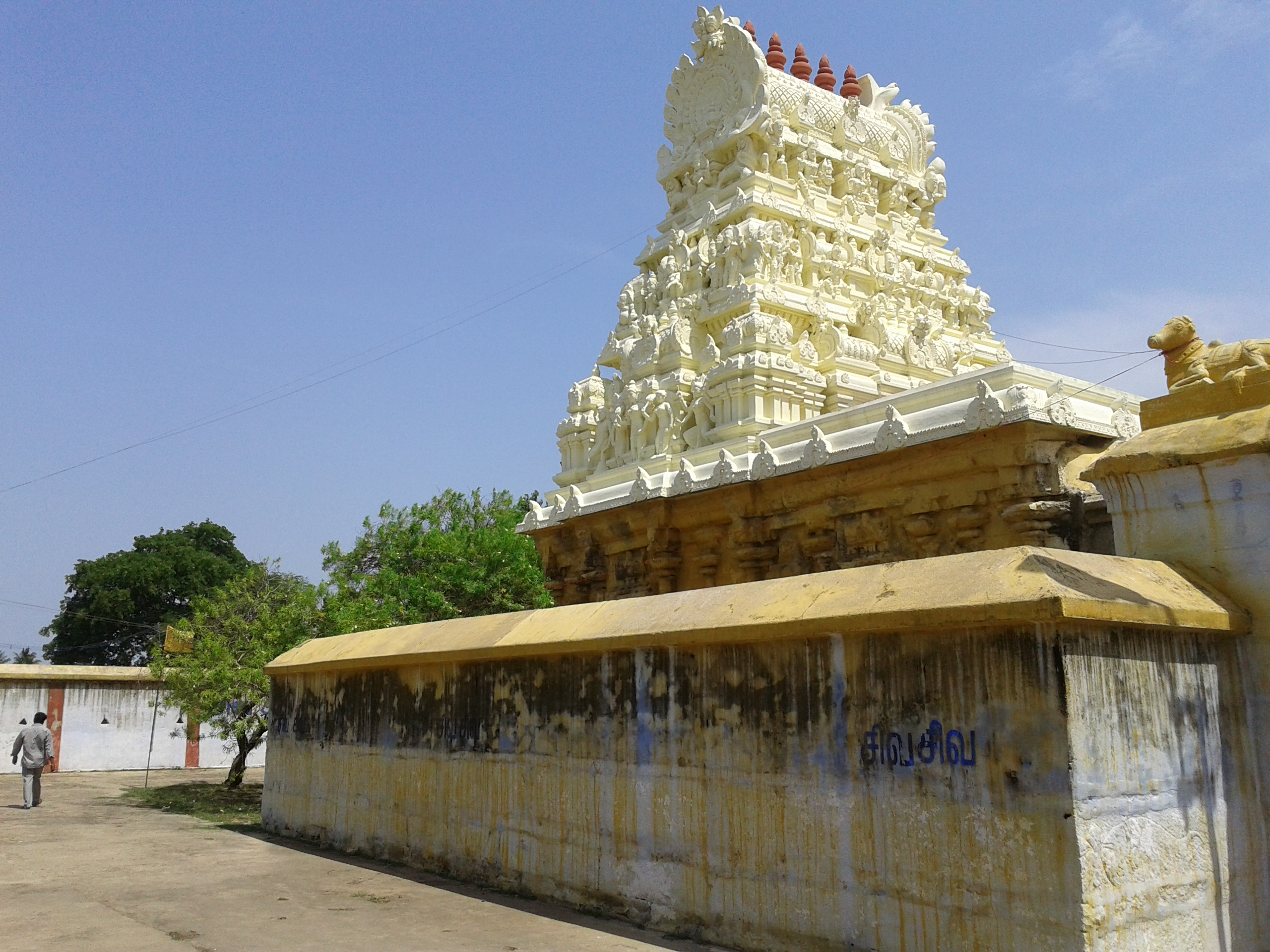
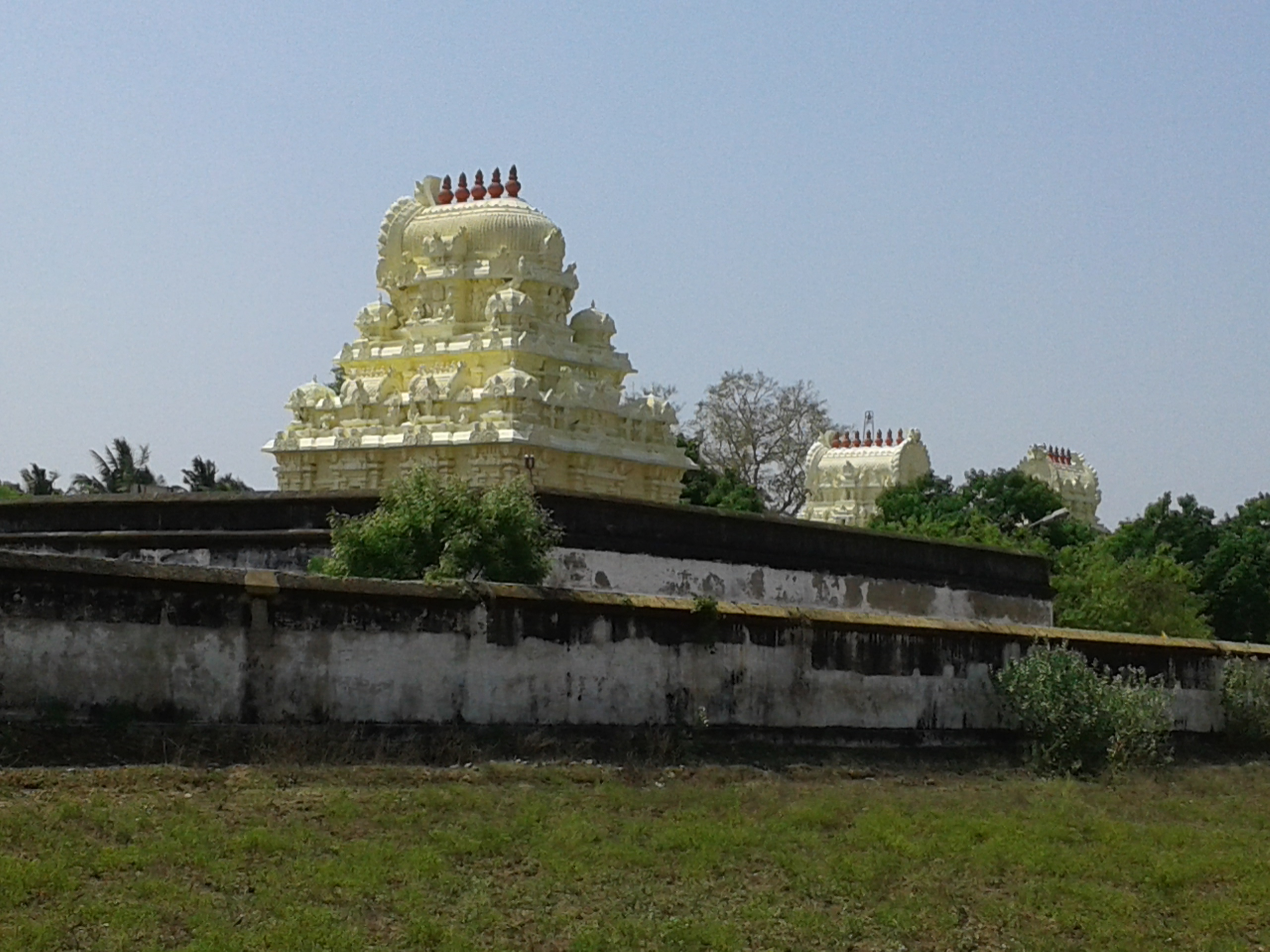
The roof of the Parvathi and Shiva shrines in the temple

Vaseeswarar temple is located in a village called Thirupasoor, around 5 km (3.1 mi) from Thiruvallur on the Thiruvallur - Thiruthani road. The temple has a five-tiered gopuram facing South, the gateway tower and all the shrines of the temple are enclosed in concentric rectangular granite walls. The central shrine is approached through the side doors facing South axial to the gateway tower through Parvathi, Murugan and Vinayaka shrines, all of which are parallel to the Shiva shrine. The central shrine facing East houses the image of Vaseeswarar in the form of Lingam. The image has a mark of tool attack and is tilted towards left. The vimana, the roof over the sanctum is Gajabrusta in design (like that of an elephant's seated posture). The shrine of Pasupathi Nayagi (also called Mohanambal), facing East has a gopuram type roof. The central shrine is approached through a Mahamandapam and Arthamandapam. As in other Shiva temples in Tamil Nadu, the shrines of Vinayaka, Murugan, Navagraha, Chandekeswara and Durga are located around the precinct of the main shrine. The second precinct has a four pillared hall and garden around the periphery of the compound wall. There are image of Saptamatrika and Srichakra consecrated by Adi Shankara in the temple.

== Religious importance and festivals ==
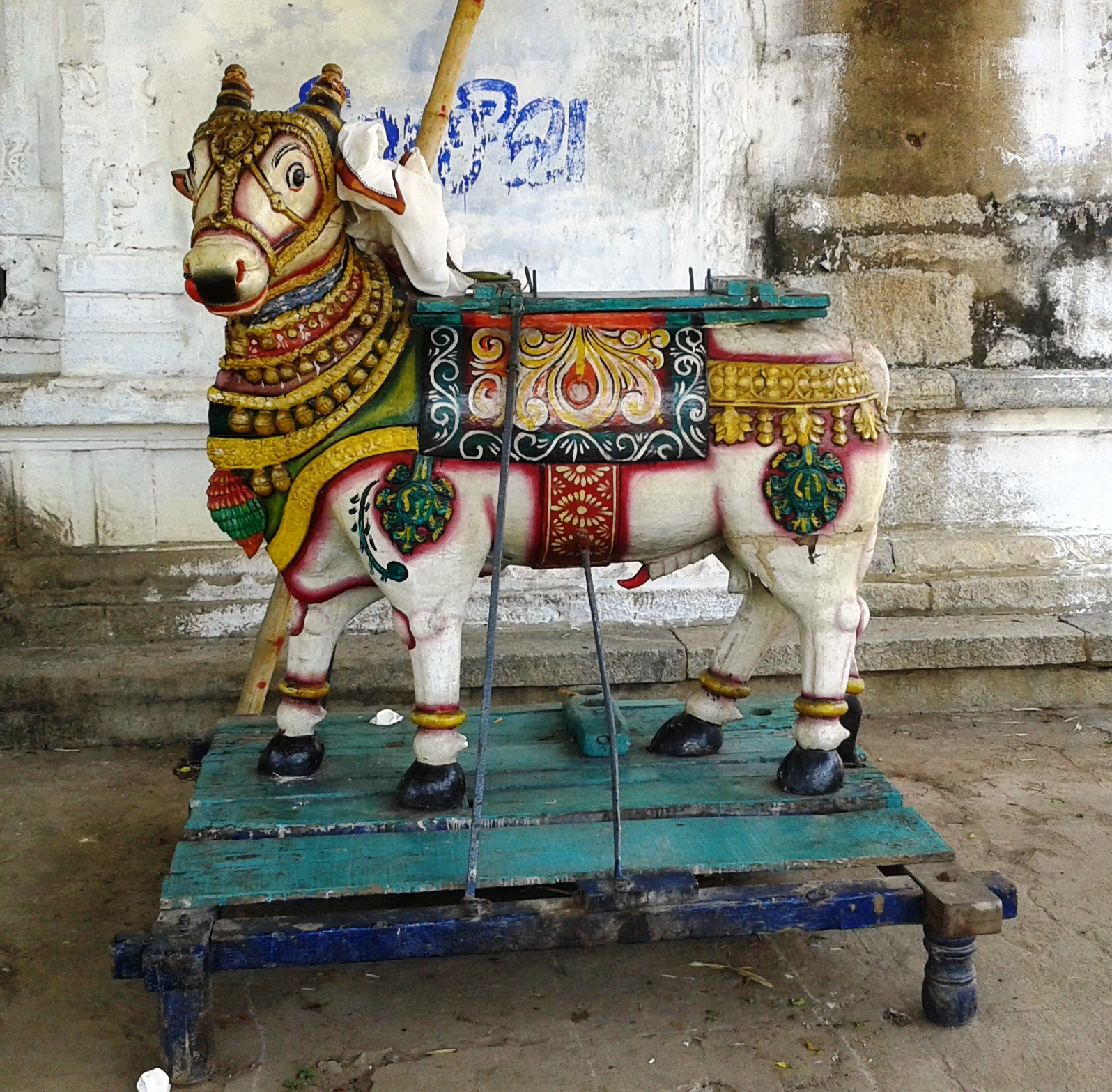
Vrishaba vehicle used during procession

Tirugnana Sambandar, a 7th-century Tamil Saivite poet, venerated Vaseeswarar in ten verses in Tevaram, compiled as the First Tirumurai. Appar, an 8th-century nayanmar, also venerated Idaiyatreeswarar in 10 verses in Tevaram, compiled as the Third Tirumurai. As the temple is revered in Tevaram, it is classified as Paadal Petra Sthalam, one of the 275 temples that find mention in the Saiva canon.

== See also ==
- Veeraraghava Perumal Temple
- Oondreswarar Temple
