= Poondi, Tiruvallur district =

Poondi
- village
- Location in Tamil Nadu, India Poondi (India)
- Coordinates: 13°12′35″N 79°52′44″E
- Country: India
- State: Tamil Nadu
- District: Tiruvallur

Government
  - Body: Poondi Panchayat Union

Population (2001)
  - Total: 4,090

Languages
  - Official: Tamil
- Time zone: UTC+5:30 (IST)
- Vehicle registration: TN-20
- Coastline: 0 kilometres (0 mi)
- Nearest city: Tiruvallur
- Sex ratio: 1163 ♂/♀
- Literacy: 69.82%
- Lok Sabha constituency: Tiruvallur
- Civic agency: Poondi Panchayat Union

Poondi is a village in the Thiruvallur taluk of Tiruvallur district, Tamil Nadu, India. It has a fresh water lake to cater the daily needs of water for Chennai City. The place is also known for Oondreswarar Temple, which was displaced to its current location to ease the construction of the reservoir.

== Demographics ==
As per the 2001 census, Poondi had a total population of 4090 with 1891 males and 2199 females.
