= Oondreswarar Temple =

Hindu temple of Shiva in Poondi, India

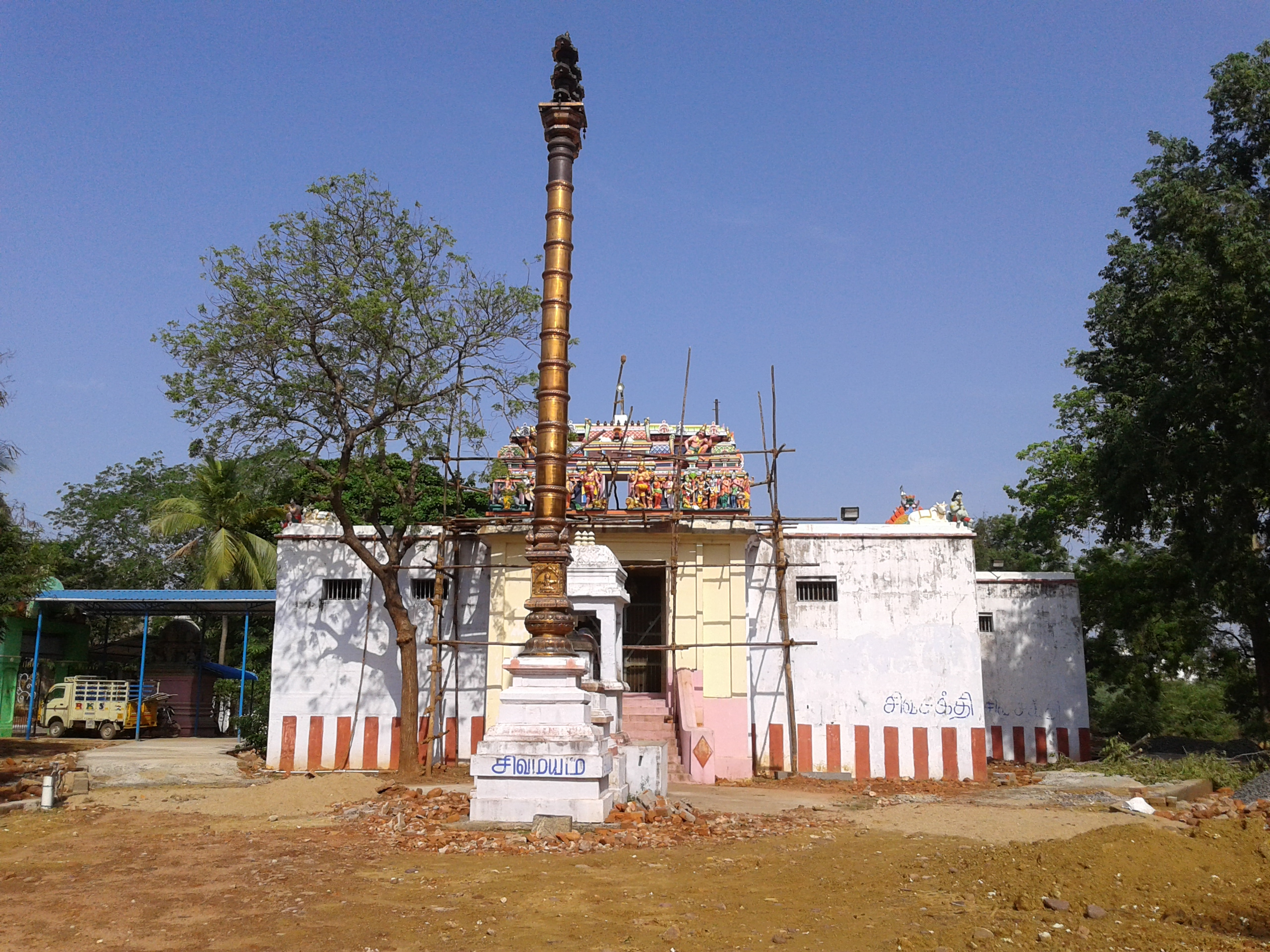

- Location in Tamil Nadu

Religion
- Affiliation: Hinduism
- District: Tiruvallur
- Deity: Oondreswarar(Shiva)

Location
- State: Tamil Nadu
- Country: India
- Coordinates: 13°12′29″N 79°52′43″E

Architecture
- Type: Dravidian architecture

Oondreswarar Temple (ஊன்றீஸ்வரர் கோயில் ) (also called Poondi Temple) is a Hindu temple dedicated to the deity Shiva, located in Poondi, a village in Tiruvallur district in the South Indian state of Tamil Nadu. Shiva is worshiped as Oondreswarar, and is represented by the lingam. His consort Parvati is depicted as Minnoli Amman. The temple is located on the Northern banks of Poondi reservoir on the Thiruvallur - Thiruthani road, 11 km (6.8 mi) away from the town. The presiding deity is revered in the 7th-century CE Tamil Saiva canonical work, the Tevaram, written by Tamil saint poets known as the Nayanmars and classified as Paadal Petra Sthalam.

The temple complex covers an area of one acre and all its shrines are enclosed with concentric rectangular walls. The temple has a number of shrines, with those of Oondreswarar and his consort Minnoli Amman being the most prominent.

The temple has three daily rituals at various times from 6:00 a.m. to 8:30 p.m., and four yearly festivals on its calendar. Brahmotsavam festival during the Tamil month of Vaikasi (May - June) is the most prominent festival celebrated in the temple.

The original complex is believed to have been built by Cholas, while the present masonry structure was built during the 16th century. The temple was moved to the current location in 1942 to ease the construction of Poondi reservoir. In modern times, the temple is maintained and administered by the Hindu Religious and Charitable Endowments Department of the Government of Tamil Nadu.

== Legend and history ==
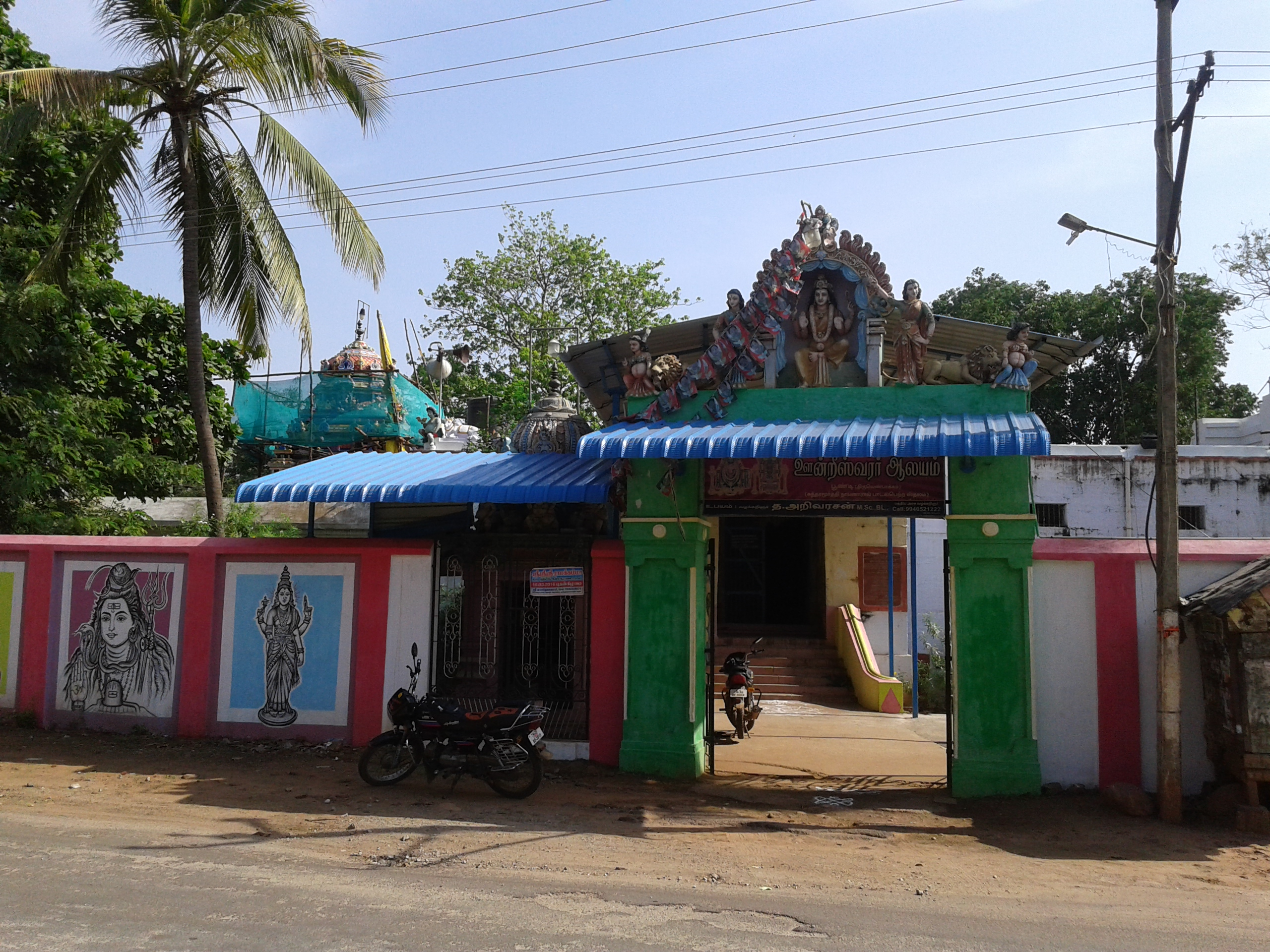
The main entrance as viewed from outside

According to Hindu Sthalapurana, Sundarar, the Nayanmar saint lost his vision while arriving at this place. Pleased with his devotion, Shiva gave him a club (meaning oondr in Tamil), he came to be known as Oondreeswarar. Sundarar was unaware of the person giving him the club and threw it away in disgust. It is believed to have broken the horn of Nandi of the temple, which is indicated in the Nandi facing Shiva. While Sundarar was on his way to Kanchipuram from this place, Parvati appeared as a lightning in front of him, giving the name of Minnoli Nayagi (minnoli indicated lightning in Tamil).

The original complex is believed to have been built by Cholas, while the present masonry structure was built during the 16th century. There are inscriptions from later Chola emperors like Rajaraja Chola I (985–1014 CE), Kulothunga Chola I (1070–1120 CE) and Rajendra Chola III (1246–1279 CE). The temple was moved to the current location in 1942 to ease the construction of Poondi reservoir by the then Mayor of Madras Sathyamurthy. Also there are several donars who had been there in the original place of reservoir having several acres of lands. They had donated lands for the reservoir and one of those is the Venpakkam Zamindars.

== Architecture ==
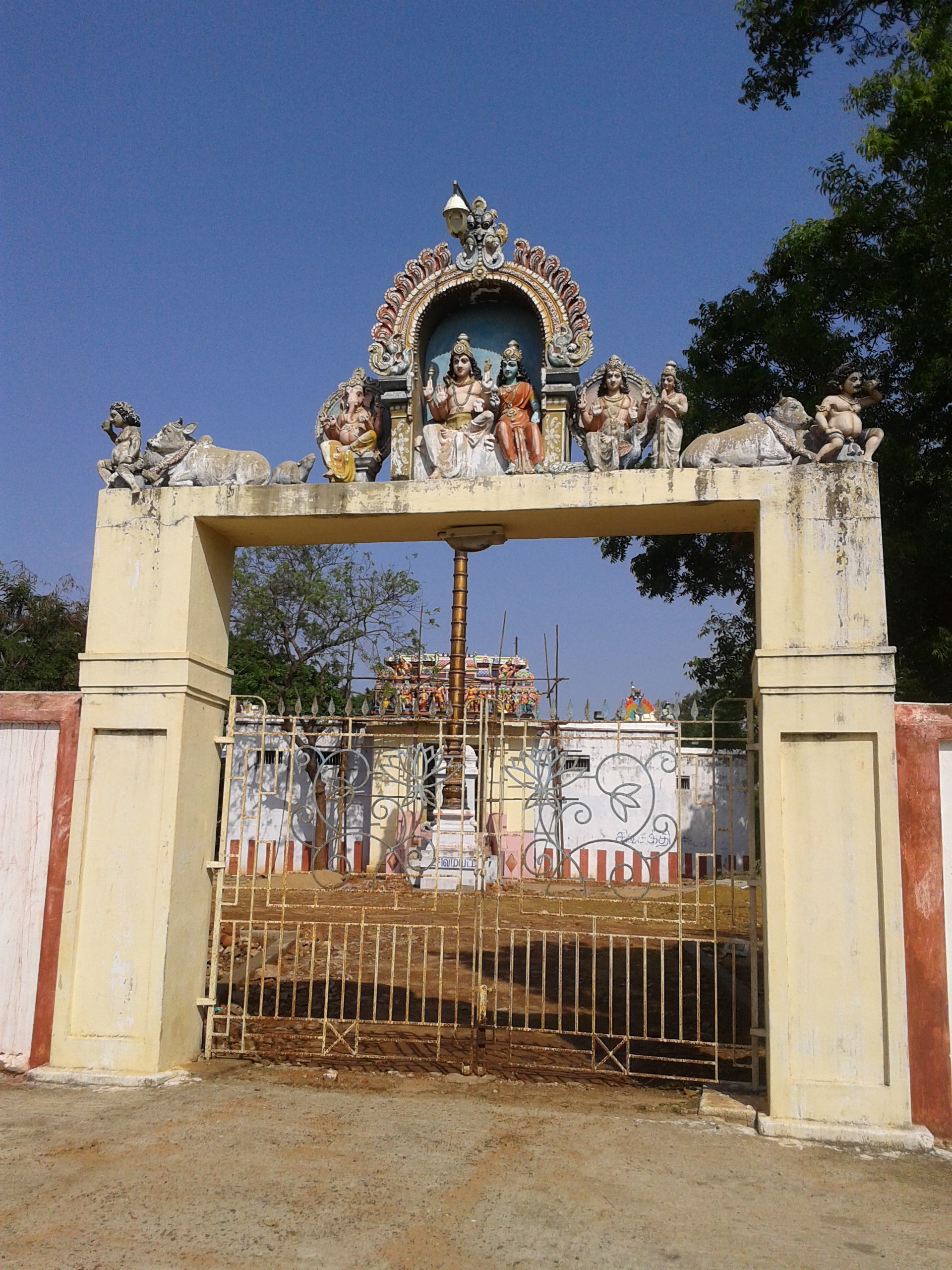
East facing entrance arch

Oondreswarar temple is located in a village called Poondi, around 11 km (6.8 mi) from Thiruvallur on the Thiruvallur - Uthukottai road. The temple has a flat entrance tower facing South, and all the shrines of the temple are enclosed in concentric rectangular granite walls. The central shrine is approached through the side doors facing North axial to the gateway tower to the Minnoli Amman shrine. The central shrine facing East houses the image of Oondreswarar in the form of Lingam. The shrine of Minnoli Amman, facing South has a gopuram type roof. The central shrine is approached through a Mahamandapam and Arthamandapam. As in other Shiva temples in Tamil Nadu, the shrines of Vinayaka, Murugan, Navagraha, Chandekeswara and Durga are located around the precinct of the main shrine. The second precinct has a shrine of Vinayaka and a garden around the periphery of the compound wall.

== See also ==
- Veeraraghava Perumal Temple
