= List of Hindu temples in Tamil Nadu =

Tamil Nadu (red) in India (gray)

This is a list of temples in the Indian state of Tamil Nadu. Tamil Nadu is the state with the highest amount of temples in India. According to the Tamil Nadu Hindu Endowments Board, there are 390,615 Hindu temples in the state. Many of these temples are over 800 years old and are spread across the state. These temples were built over centuries by the rulers of various dynasties.

The state holds some of the largest Hindu temples. Historical records for the temple date back to at least 3,000 years ago. In Indian and Tamil culture, temples are not only considered as a place for spirituality but also shows the way of living, art, culture, knowledge, and sacrifice of people's life to protect the temples from invaders. Many temples contain inscriptions detailing the democratic rule of kings, which later inspired India's modern voting system.

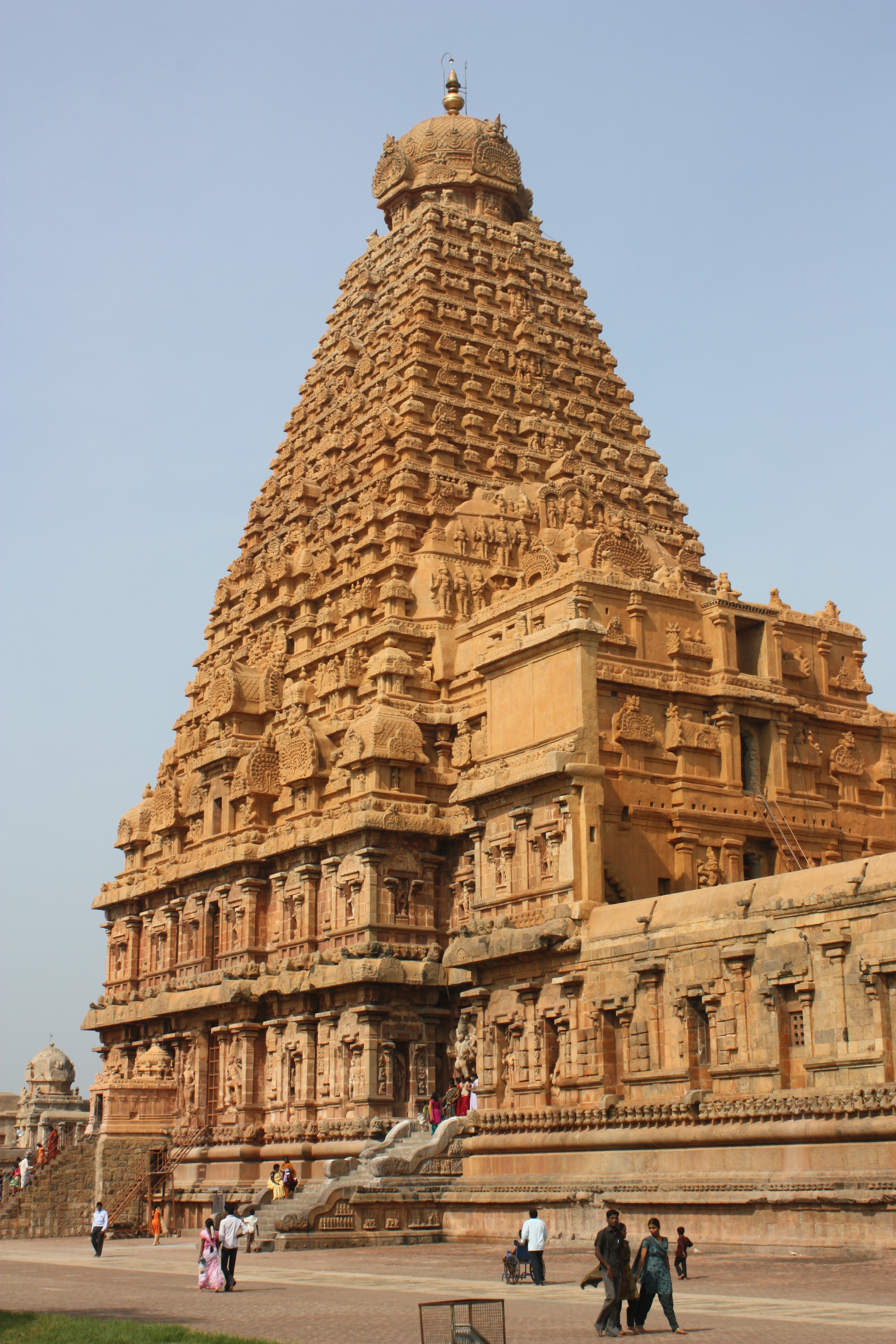
Rajarajeswaram, also known as Brihadeshwara temple built by Chola emperor Rajaraja-I at Thanjavur dedicated to Lord Shiva.

Sri Ranganathaswamy Temple, dedicated to Maha Vishnu, is located in Srirangam. It is the largest temple compound in India and one of the largest religious complexes in the world. Some of these structures have been renovated, expanded and rebuilt over the centuries as a living temple. The latest addition is the outer tower that is approximately 73 metres (240 ft) tall and was completed in 1987. The temple is an active Hindu house of worship and follows the Tenkalai tradition of Sri Vaishnavism. The temple is one of the oldest temples in the world, which consists of inscriptions dating around 100 BCE. The annual 21-day festival conducted during the Tamil month of Margali (December–January) attracts at least one million visitors every year. The temple complex has been nominated as an UNESCO World Heritage Site and is in UNESCO's tentative list.

Other temples like Madurai's Kallalagar temple — which has high Gopuram towers ornamented with colourful figures — and the Meenakshi Temple, which has high colourful towers and great long halls, are also of note. On Pamban Island, Ramanathaswamy Temple is a pilgrimage site. The town of Kanyakumari, at India's southernmost tip, is the site of ritual sunrises.

The state also abounds with temple tanks. The state has 2,359 temple tanks located in 1,586 temples. The government has identified 1,068 tanks for renovation.

== Temples of Ganesha ==
S.No	Name of Temple	Name of Deity	Location (Travel Base)	Built around	Notes/Beliefs
1	Karpaka Vinayakar Temple	Karpaka Vinayakar	Pillayarpatti (Karaikkudi)	7th century CE	One of only two temples in the world that show Ganesha with two arms. The other is in Afghanistan.
2	Ucchi Pillayar Temple	Uchhi Pillayar	Tiruchirappalli	700-900 CE	Ganesha is shown with a small bump on his head, which was caused when Vibhishana knuckled him on his head.
3	Manakula Vinayagar Temple	Manakula Vinayagar	Pondicherry (Puducherry)	1688 CE	Named as Bhuvaneshar Ganapathy, now called as Manakula Vinayagar. In Tamil 'Manal' means sand and 'Kulam' means pond near the sea, meaning God near the pond of sand.
4	Uchchhishta Ganapathy Temple	Uchchhishta Ganapati	Tirunelveli	1000 CE	The only big ancient temple more than 1000 years ago for Uchishtta Ganapathy is situated in Manimoortheeswaram on the banks of River Thamirabarani in Tirunelveli, Tamil Nadu, India.
5	Sri Poyyamozhi Vinayagar Temple	Sri Poyyamozhi Swayambu Vinayagar	Theevanur (NH 66 (Krishnagiri-Pondicherry National Highway), Tindivanam, Tamil Nadu)	1100 CE	Swayambu Vinayaka temple with a Ganesha that looks like Siva Lingam. Very Powerful deity that cures all diseases, gives boon for power and position
6	Meenakshi Temple	Mukkuruni Vinayakar	Madurai	1600 CE	This popular Ganesha shrine is located inside the Madurai Meenakshi Temple.
7	Adi vinayagar Temple	Adi vinayagar	Poonthottam (Thiruvarur)	700 CE	The name Thilatharpanapuri comes from two words thil meaning Gingely and tharpana is the Hindu ritual of performing pithru karmas (ritual of paying tribute to ancestors) to one's ancestors. It is also known as Sethalapathy. There are 7 sthalams for performing these rituals viz. Kasi, Rameswaram, Srivanchiyam, Thiruvenkadu, Gaya, Triveni Sangamam & Thilatharpanapuri.
8	Abhishtavaradha Ganapathi Temple	Abhishtavaradha Ganapathi	Thiruvaiyaru (Tanjavur)	-	Agastya attained his dwarf form at this abode.
9	Naramuga Vinayakar Temple	Naramuga Vinayakar	Chidambaram (Cuddalore)	-	The Ganesha idol is human-faced in this temple.
10	Ganapatheeswarar Temple	Vatapi Ganapathi	Tiruchenkattankudi (Tanjavur)	700 CE	The Ganesha idol was brought here from Vatapi by the Pallavas.
11	Khabartheesar Karpaga Nathar Temple	Sweta Vinayakar	Tiruvalanchuzhi (Tanjavur)	-	The deity represents the white image of Ganesha that was formed when the Devas churned the holy milky ocean
12	Eachanari Vinayagar Temple	Ganesan	Eachanari (Coimbatore)	1500 CE	The deity was brought here from Madurai by the Nayaks, originally meant for Perur Temple.
13	Puliakulam Vinayakar Temple	Munthi Vinayakar	Puliakulam (Coimbatore)	1993 CE	The idol of the chief deity here is supposed to be one of the largest in South Asia.
14	Sree Vigneswarar Temple	Sree Vigneswar	Mela Kolappadi-Andimadam (Ariyalur district)	1997 CE	The idol of the chief deity here is supposed to be one of the largest in South Asia.
15	Periya Uchipillaiyar Temple	Uchhi Pillayar	Periya Uchipillaiyar Temple (Kumbakonam)	1000 CE	The temple is in the city centre of Kumbakonam.
16	Sri Maha Ganapathi Temple	Ganapathi Agraharam	Sri Maha Ganapathi Temple near Kumbakonam	1000 years	The temple is 25 km from Kumbakonam on Thiruvaiyaru bus route. The Vinayagar was actually installed at this temple by Agasthiyar (Ancient Hindu priest) more than 1000 years ago. He had done this with a holy intention of protecting the globe against of massive starvation. The Ganapathi idol has its own look, where this cannot be seen anywhere else.
17	Arulmigu Prasanna Vinayagar Temple	Sri Prasanna Vinayagar	Arulmigu Prasanna Vinayagar Temple, Ganapathy Pudur Coimbatore	1937 CE	The temple kumababishekam held on 1937 ganapathypudur in Coimbatore district Website:https://temple.dinamalar.com/New.php?id=2187
18	Jambhulinga Vinayagar Temple	Sri Jambhulinga Vinayagar	Jambhulinga Vinayagar Temple, Thathankuppam, Chennai	1940 CE	The temple is known for a court case in which a statue responded to identify among the many were stolen
19	Panchamuga Vinayagar Temple	Sri Panchamuga Vinayagar	Panchamuga Vinayagar Temple, Paramathi Velur Namakkal		The temple where you will find 4 sides of face and on top of that one face of Vinayagar

== Temples of Murugan ==
=== Six Abodes of Murugan ===
S.No.	Name of Temple	Name of Deity	Location (Travel Base)	Built around	Notes/Beliefs
1	Tiruavinankudi Temple	Dandayudhapani Swami	Pazhani (Dindigul)	-	This temple is the third among the six Holy Abodes. The Murugan idol was made by Bogar from an amalgam of nine toxic substances (Navabaashaanam)
2	Arulmigu Subramanya Swami Temple	Senthil Andavar	Tiruchendur (Thoothukkudi)	100 CE	This is the second among the six abodes and the only seashore Murugan temple. It is here that Surasamharam takes place, as this temple was Murugan's battle camp against the asura Surapadman who was being hosted at Vira Mahendram, a mid-ocean fortress.
3	Swamimalai Murugan Temple	Swaminatha Swamy	Swamimalai (Thanjavur)	-	This temple is the fourth among the six Holy Abodes. Murugan explained the meaning of Omkaram to his father Shiva here.
4	Tirupparankunram Murugan Temple	Subramanya Swami	Tirupparankunram (Madurai)	-	Murugan married Deivanai at this abode, also is the fourth among the Six Holy Abodes of Murugan
5	Tiruttanikai Murugan Temple	Tanikesan	Tiruttani (Tiruvallur)	-	Murugan married Valli at this abode. This temple is the fifth among the six Holy Abodes. Murugan imparted the knowledge of Tamil to Sage Agathiyar here
6	Pazhamudhircholai Temple	Malaikkizhavon	Pazhamudhircholai (Madurai)	-	This temple is the last one of the six Holy Abodes. Murugan tested Avvaiyar's knowledge under a tree here

=== Other major Murugan temples ===
- Six Abodes of Murugan, the six sacred mountains of Tamil Nadu.

S.No	Name of Temple	Name of Deity	Location (Travel Base)	Built around	Notes/Beliefs
1	Balasubraminiya Swamy Temple	Murugan	Thiruvidakazhi, Mayiladuthurai	25 CE	It is a 2000-year-old Murugan temple believed that Lord Murugan worshipped Lord Shiva here, making the temple a sacred site for absolving sins and removing obstacles to marriage.
2	Kuzhanthai Velappar Temple	Murugan	Poombarai (Kodaikanal)	1000 CE	The Kuzhanthai Velappar Temple (Kulandai Velayudha Swami Tirukkovil)[6] has three thousand years of history and was consecrated by Bhogar. The idol is made of Navaphasanam(Dasabashanam) . As per inscriptions in the temple which temple has built by king of Chera dynasty during 10/12 Century.There is a song-poem(Poombarai Velan) by Aruna giri nathar who lived during the 15th century
3	Sri Navaneethaswara Swamy Temple	Singaravelavar	Sikkal (Tanjavur)	-	Murugan received his weapon, the Velayudham, from his mother Parvathi and used it to perform the Surasamharam at Tiruchendur.
4	Marudamalai Subramanya Swamy Temple	Dandayudhapani Swamy	Marudamalai (Coimbatore)	1200 CE	It's here that The Devas approach Murugan to seek his help in destroying Surapadman.
5	Kumarakkottam Subramanya Swamy Temple	Brahmasaastha	Kumarakkottam (Kanchipuram)	-	Kachiappa Sivachariar wrote the sacred Kanda Puraanam at this temple. Also, Murugan assumed the role of the Creator here, after imprisoning Brahma for his ignorance of the meaning of the Pranava manthiram.
6	Valliyur Subramanya Swamy Temple	Aanantha Kalyana Subramanyar thirumalai kovil, shencottai	Valliyur (Tirunelveli)	-	The Subramanyar Temple at Valliyur in Tirunelveli District is a rock-cut sanctum carved out of a hill. The Saravanappoigai in this temple was created by Murugan at the request of Valli, his consort.
7	Vallakkottai Murugan Temple	Kodaiyandavar	Vallakkottai (Chennai)	-	The Murugan idol in this temple is the tallest in Tamil Nadu, at 7 ft.
8	Kandaswamy Temple	Kandaswamy	Tirupporur (Chennai)	1000 CE	After killing Surapadman at Tiruchendur, Murugan killed the rest of the asuras here, at Tirupporur (literally, 'place of the sacred war')
9	Sri Subramaniya Swamy Temple	Kumara Vayalur	Tiruchirappalli	1200 years	Muruga blessed the saint-poet Arunagiri Nāthar at Vayalur by writing OM in his tongue and initiated him to compose Tiruppugal. Arunagirināthar wrote 18 verses (910–927) on Vayalur in the Tiruppukal. Nataraja is in the Sadura Danda pose in this Temple.
10	Shanmuganathan Temple	Aarumaga Swamy	Viralimalai (Tiruchirappalli)	-	Sage Vasishtar and his wife Arundhathi pray Murugan here to ward off their curses. The temple is also known for its peacocks.
11	Mayilam Murugan Temple	Aarumaga Swamy.	Mayilam (Villupuram)	-	At the end of Surasamharam, one half of Surapadman assumed the form of the peacock here.
12	Pazhani Aandavar Temple	Pazhani Andavar	Vadapalani, Chennai	1875 CE	One of the temples built in the modern era, this temple had extensive patronage from the renowned devotee of Murugan Arulmigu Kribanandha Variyar..
13	Sri Vetri Velayudhaswami Temple	Kaithamalai	Uttukuli	Not Known but Reconstructed in 1999	Vetri Velyadhaswami appeared in front the great Tamil saint Agastiyar and helped him to perform his pooja Agastiyar.
14	Thindal Murugan Temple	Thindalmalai	Erode	-	Velyadhaswami temple is a model of Birla Mandir, with Golden Temple Car.
15	Arulmigu Subramanyaswamy Thirukovil	Sivanmalai, Kangayam,	Tirupur	-	One of the well known myths associated with Siva is his conquest of Tripuram – the three celestial cities which the Asuras (demons) had taken over, and wreaked havoc over them. The Devas (celestial gods) appealed to Siva for help and asked him to save them from the demons. Siva made mount Meru his bow, and Vasuki the serpent his bow-string and prepared to wage war against the Asuras.
16	Pachaimalai Subramanya Swamy Temple	Pachaimalai	Gobichettipalayam	-	One of the two hill temples for Murugan in Gobi, the other one being Pavazhamalai which is only 2 km away from Pachaimalai. Though this temple is very old, the structure has been built starting 1967.
17	Pavalamalai Muthukumara Swamy Temple	Pavalamalai	Gobichettipalayam	-	The second hill temple for Murugan in Gobi.
18	Siragiri Dandayudhapani	Chennimalai	Erode	-	This hill is also called Sigaragiri, Pushpagiri and Siragiri and is located between Kangeyam and Perundurai. It is one of the better known temples of Murugan in Coimbatore district where Arunagirinathar was blessed with "Padikasu", wealth of coins. This is where a miracle took place in the year 1984 on 12 February. On that eventful day two bullocks of their own accord pulled a bullock cart up the 1320 steps. Saravana Munivar wrote the most popular Chennimalai Sthalapuranam 700 years ago. Milk and curds are used as special offerings to Murugan in Chennimalai and it is the general belief that curds do not become sour here.
19	Velayudhasamy Thirukoil	Pugazhi malai	Karur	2000CE	The temple is located on a hillock. This place is called Aarunattar malai which is considered as one of the oldest Hill rock of the south.
20	Balasubramaniya Murugan Temple	Vennai malai	Karur	1800CE	The temple was worshiped by Brahma and Kamadhenu. This ancient temple dedicated to Muruga has the distinction of being visited by the Saiva saint Arunagirinathar once. This hill temple enshrines the images of Murugan.
21	Arulmigu Balamurugan Temple	Rathnagiri	Thirumanikundram, Vellore	1500CE	Rathinagiri Bala Murugan Temple was built around the 14th century. Over the passage of time an ordinary sand structure was converted into a stone shrine. The 14th Century poet Arunagirinathar' has sung about this temple as Rathinakiri Vazh Murukane Ilaya Vaaramarar Perumaley, which means 'Murugan, the God of Devas resides in Rathinagiri'
22	Rajendra Chozheewarar Temple	Balasubramaniyan	Periyakulam, Theni	-	-
23	Sri Kolanjiappar Temple	Kolanjiappar	Manavalanallur 2 km from Vriddhachalam	1000 years old	The benevolent Shiva so as to liberate the entire living being has incarnated himself in many holy Shrines in the so-called Middle Country. (Nadu Naadu). Vriddhachalam (means age old holy hill) is the best among such holy shrines. Two Mile west of this, there is a small village namely Manavalanallur. Where there is abundance of flowery trees bristling with humming of birds and insects. It is known as Manavalanallur because Murugan, the Manavalan (Eternal Bridegroom) has embodied himself here. In the words of Arunagirinathar. "He is the Manavalan residing in the monkeys inhabited hill"
24	Uthanda Velayudhaswamy temple, Uthiyur	Velayudhasamy	Uthiyur Hills, Kangeyam, Tiruppur district	9th century CE	Uthanda Velayudhasamy Temple is the main shrine dedicated turugan after a flight of 100 steps in Uthiyur hills from the ground. It built in dravidian architecture with a huge water-well as well and the little path with few rocky steps beside the temple lead to the base of a hillock and the steps ended there as well. In this shrine, Velayudhaswamy appears with his spear and Peacock. There are many sculptures here and also some ancient era hero-stones.
25	Balasubramaniyar Temple, Siruvaapuri	Balasubramaniyar	Chinnambedu, Siruvaapuri, Tiruvallur	14th century CE	Siruvaapuri is connected to the epic Ramayanam and is the place where the sons' of Rama, Lava and Kusha lived. Since they fought with Rama here it is called "Siruvar Por Puri", which latter became "Siruvaapuri". However, the village is now called as Chinnambedu. Arunagirinathar the Tamil Saint of 14th century CE has visited this temple and has composed Tiruppukal songs on the Murugan in this temple. He is standing facing the deity. The special feature of this temple is the presence of emarald peacock. The village is located 40 km from Chennai and can be reached by a detour before reaching Puduvoyal near Kavarapettai, before Gummidipoondi in Chennai - Kolkatta NH.

== Temples of Vishnu ==
கரிகிருஷ்ணா பெருமாள் கோவில் பொன்னேரி.

- Ranganathaswamy Temple, Srirangam
- Andal Temple, Srivilliputtur
- Namagiri Thayar Sametha Narasimhaswamy perumal temple, Namakkal
- Gunaseelam Prasana Venkatachalapathy Perumal Temple
- Chakrapani Temple, Kumbakonam
- Sarangapani temple, Kumbakonam
- Ulagalantha Perumal Temple, Kanchipuram
- Parthasarathy Temple, Triplicane
- Bhu Varaha Swamy temple
- Adi Srinivasa perumal temple
- Varadharaja Perumal Temple, Kanchipuram
- Ashtabujakaram
- Adikesava Perumal Temple, Kanyakumari
- Pandava Thoothar Perumal Temple
- Rajagopalaswamy Temple, Mannargudi
- Ulagalantha Perumal Temple, Tirukoyilur
- Mudikondan Kothandaramar Temple
- Thirupullabhoothangudi Temple
- Kola Valvill Ramar Temple, Tiruvelliyangudi
- Vijayaraghava Perumal temple
- Kattu Narasimhaperumal Temple, Srirangam
- Sundaravarada Perumal temple
- Ramaswamy Temple, Kumbakonam
- Vaikunda Perumal Temple, Uthiramerur
- Tiruparamechura Vinnagaram - Sri Vaikunda Perumal Temple, Kanchipuram
- Tirupavalavannam - Sri Pavala Vanar Temple, Kanchipuram
- Tirupaadagam - Sri Pandava Thoodar Temple, Kanchipuram
- Tirunilaaththingalthundam - Sri Nilathingal Thundathan Perumal Temple, Kanchipuram
- Tirupputkuzhi - Sri Vijaya Raghava Perumal Temple, Kanchipuram
- Tirivikrama Perumal Temple
- Appakkudathaan Perumal Temple
- Thanjai Mamani Koil, Thanjavur
- Parimala Ranganatha Perumal temple, Mayiladuthurai
- Devaadi Raja Perumal temple, Therazhundur, Mayiladuthurai
- Azhagiyasingar Temple, Thiruvali, Mayiladuthurai
- Azhagiya Manavala Perumal Temple
- Sundararaja Perumal temple
- Srinivasa Perumal Temple, Tirukulandhai
- Varadaraja Perumal Temple, Shoolagiri
- Vedanarayana perumal temple, Thirunarayanapuram
- Sri Venkatesa Perumal Temple (Melathiruppathi) – Mondipalayam
- Ranganatha Temple, Thiruneermalai
- Veeraraghava Swamy Temple, Tiruvallur
- Sri Kalyana Ramaswamy temple
- Loganatha Perumal Temple
- Neelamegha Perumal temple
- Soundararajaperumal temple, Nagapattinam
- Vanamamalai Perumal temple
- Ranganathaswamy temple, Karamadai, Coimbatore
- Varadharaja Perumal Temple, Puducherry
- Sri Yoga Rama Temple, Nedungunam Chettupattu
- Yoga Narasimhaswamy Temple Sholingur
- Devanathaswamy temple, Thiruvanthipuram
- Oppiliappan temple
- Bhaktavatsala Perumal temple, Tirukannamangai
- Krishnapuram Venkatachalapathy temple
- Soundararajaperumal temple, Thadikombu
- Santana Srinivasa Temple at Mogappair
- Saranatha Perumal Temple
- Nithyakalyana Perumal temple at Tiruvidanthai, Chennai
- Srivaikuntanathan Perumal temple
- Abaya Hastha Swayambu Sri Lakshmi Narasimha Swamy Temple, Agaram Village, Hosur
- Adhirangam Ranganathaswamy temple
- Adikesava Perumal temple, Mylapore
- Adikesava Perumal Temple, Paramandur
- Adikesava Perumal temple, Sriperumpudur
- Andalukkum Aiyan Temple
- Arulmigu Prasanna Venkatesa Perumal Temple
- Sri Kodandaramaswamy temple, Ayoyhyapatinam, Salem
- Betrayaswamy temple
- Eri-Katha Ramar Temple
- Jakath Rakshaka Perumal temple, Thirukkoodaloor
- Jagannatha Perumal temple
- Adi Jagannatha Perumal Temple
- Varadharajaperumal temple, Thirubuvanai
- Chenraya Perumal Temple
- Senji Singavaram Ranganatha Temple
- Gingee Venkataramana Temple
- Ranganatha Perumal Temple at Erode Fort
- Magudeswarar Temple, Kodumudi, Erode
- Kongu Tirupati at Erode
- Sri Viswaroopha Lakshmi Nrusimha Temple at Kattavakkam, Kancheepuram District, Near Thenneri
- The LakshmiNarasimhar Temple at Tindivanam
- The Lakshmi Narayan Temple at Pulikkundram near Thirukazhukundram
- The Kesavaperumal Temple at Chennai
- The Lakshmi Narasimhar Temple at Chennai
- Sri Mayakoothar Devasthanams, Perungulam, Tuticorin [Thoothukudi]
- Arulmegu sattur perumal swamy temple, Solavampalayam, Kinathukadavu, Pollachi, Coimbatore
- Sri Adivaraha Temple Kallidaikurichi Tamlinadu
- Sri Veeraragava perumal Temple, Dharapuram, Tirupur
- Adi Narayana Perumal Temple, Pariyur, Gobichettipalayam
- Kalyana venkatramanaswamy Temple, Thannthondri Malai, Karur
- Shree Abayapradhana Ranganathar Temple, Karur
- Vasantha perumal Temple, Kadavur, Karur
- Neelameegha perumal Temple, Kulithalai, Karur
- Kripasamudra Perumal (Arulmakadal) Temple at Mayiladuthurai
- Varadharaja Perumal Temple, Nainamalai
- Narasimha Temple at Tindivanam
- Yoga Narasimha Temple at Velachery, Chennai
- Sri Srinivaasa Perumal, Thirumaleeswarar Temple, Arakonam
- Sri Lakshmi Narayanan Kovil, Sathyamangalam
- Pulikundram Sri Lakshmi Narayana Temple, Pulikkundram, Mahabalipuram, Tirukalukundram
- Lakshmi Narasimha Swamy Temple, Vellore
- Ranganathaswamy Temple, Bethur
- Mannarakrishna temple, Ramiyananhalli
- Seetha devi sametha Kodandaramaswamy temple, Ramiyanahalli

=== See also ===
- Divyadesam
- Abhimana Kshethram
- Pancharanga Kshetrams
- Nava Tirupati Kshethrams
- Pancha Kshethram
- Pancha Ramachandra Kshethram

== Temples of Shiva ==
- Mayuranathaswami Temple, Mayiladuthurai
- Koorainadu Punukeeswarar Temple, Mayiladuthurai
- Tiruppukkozhiyur Avinashi lingeshwarar temple, Tirupur
- Perur Pateeswarar Temple, Coimbatore
- Sarva Sitheshwarar Shiva temple, Madipakkam, Chennai
- Agatheeshwarar temple, Ponneri.
- Thirumaleeswarar Temple, Thirumathalampakkam, Arakonam Tk, Vellore Dt.
- Shivan temple, Thiru kundachappai village, Ooty, The Nilgiris Dt.
- Chenchadainathar Karunakadakshi Temple, Thirumal Ugandan kotai ( TM Kotai ), Ramanathapuram dist, Tamil Nadu, India
- Arulmigu Amarasundreashwarar Temple, Singalandapuram, Thuraiyur taluk, Tiruchirappalli district
- Surayanarayanar Temple, Gnairu, Ponneri
- Madurai Meenakshi Sundareswarar Temple, Madurai
- Nellaiappar Temple, Tirunelveli
- Kasivisavanathar Gnanaambaigai Temple, Uthamapalayam
- Sankaranayinarkoil or Sankaranaraya swamy temple, Sankarankovil
- Chintamani nathar temple, vasudevanallur
- Brihadeeswarar Temple at Thanjavur
- Vaitheeshwaran Temple near Mayiladuthurai
- Jalakandeswarar Temple, inside the Vellore Fort, Vellore
- Kapaleeshwarar Temple at Mylapore, Chennai
- Dandeeswarar Koil, Velachery, Chennai
- Ramanathaswamy Temple at Rameshwaram
- Jambukeswarar Temple, Thiruvanaikaval at Tirucharapalli
- Arunachaleshwarar Temple at Thiruvannamalai
- Thillai Nataraja Temple at Chidambaram
- Vedapureeswarar Temple at Pondicherry
- Thyagaraja Temple at Thiruvarur
- Ekambaranathar Temple(Kachi Egambam) at Kancheepuram
- Thirumagaraleeswarar Temple at Kancheepuram
- Kailasanathar Temple, Kanchipuram
- Karchapeswarar Temple, Kanchipuram
- Vazhakarutheeswarar Temple, Kanchipuram
- Sathyanatheswarar Temple ( Kachi Nerikkaaraikkadu), Kanchipuram
- Metraleeswar Temple(Kachi Metrali), Kanchipuram
- Iravatanesvara Temple, Kanchipuram
- Muktheeswarar Temple, Kanchipuram
- Ona Kantheeswarar Temple (Onakanthan Thali)
- Anekadhangavadeswarar Temple (Kachi Anekatangapadam)
- Kalyana Pasupatheeswarar Temple (Thiru Aanilai), Karur
- Kalyanasundareswarar Temple, Thirumanancheri, Mayiladuthurai
- Magudeeswarar Temple, Kodumudi, Erode
- Virdhgiriswarar Temple at Vriddhachalam
- Sree Pasupatheeswarar Temple, Pandanainallur
- Thenupuriswarar Temple at Pattiswaram, Kumbakonam
- Nageeswarar Temple, Kumbakonam
- Amarapaneeswarar Temple at Pariyur, Gobichettipalayam
- Arudra Kabaleeswarar Temple at Erode
- Vigirtheeswarar Temple, Venjamangudalur, Karur
- Rathinagireeshwarar Temple, Iyermalai, Karur
- Sangameswarar Temple at Bhavani
- Natadreeswarar Temple inside Cauvery, Erode
- Emaneswarar Temple, Emaneswaram at Paramakudi.
- Agneeswarar Koil, Thirukkaattuppalli
- Sattainathar Temple, Sirkazhi
- Thaayumaanavar Koil, Tiruchy
- Poongundra Nathar Temple, Mahibalanpatti (sivagangai)
- Veerattaaneswarar Koil, Korukkai
- Koenaeswarar Koil, Kudavaasal
- Seshapureeswarar Koil, Thiruppaamburam
- Ligusaranyeswarar Koil, Ponnur
- Amirthakalasanaathar Koil, Sakkottai
- Hayavandheeswarar Koil, Seeyaaththamangai
- Maanikkavannar Koil, Thirumarugal
- Sookshmapureeswarar Koil, Sirukudi
- Uthraapatheeswarar Koil, Thiruchchengaattaangudi
- Panchanadheeswarar Koil, Thiruvaiyaru
- Pasupatheeswarar Koil, Aavoor
- Kasi Vishwanathar Temple, Darapuram
- Thiruaavinankudi Temple, Palani
- Agastheeswarar Koil, Agasthiyampalli
- AmudhaGataeswarar Koil, Kodikkarai
- Suguvaneshwarar Temple, Salem
- Kailashnathar Temple, Tharamangalam, Salem
- Theerthagirieswarar Temple, Theerthamalai, Dharmapuri
- Chandra Choodeswarar Temple, Hosur
- Sri Ramalinga Sowdambikai Amman Temple at Raja street, Coimbatore.
- Sri Manneaswarar Kovil, Annur, Coimbatore
- Old Someaswarar Kovil at Annaimalai, Pollachi.
- Shree Sadhasiva Bhrameendhraal Temple, Nerur, Karur
- Sivapurishwarar Temple, Shivayam, Karur
- Brahmapureeswarar Temple, Thirupattur, Tiruchirappalli
- Sangameswarar Temple, Bhavani, Erode
- Kadambavananathar Temple, Kulithalai, Karur
- Ardhanaareeswarar Temple, Tiruchengodu, Namakkal
- Arapaleeswarar Temple, Kolli Hills, Namakkal
- Viratteeswarar Temple, Pillur, Namakkal
- Arulmigu Vedapurishwarar Temple, Thiruvothur, CHEYYAR.
- Ekambareswarar Temple, Chettikulam, Perambalur Dt, Tamil Nadu
- Sri Sivashankara Kasiviswanather Temple at Sri Chinna Mariamman Temple Kodaikanal.
- Arulmigu Vedhagiriswarar Temple, Thirukalukundram
- Kondarangi Hills - Malligarjuna Swamy Temple, Konrangi Keeranur, Oddanchatram
- Arulmigu Kulantahivelappar Temple, Oddanchatram
- Agatheeshwarar temple, Dharapuram, Tirupur(https://web.archive.org/web/20160304220842/http://www.agastheeswarartemple.tinfo.in/)
- Arulmigu Sri Sivan Anaindha Pottri Temple, Mamsapuram, Srivilliputhur, Virudhunagar https://temple.dinamalar.com/en/new_en.php?id=2057
- Arulmigu Brihadeeswarar and Mangalambigai temple in Kazhipattur, OMR
- Vedaranyeswarar Temple, Vedaranyam, Nagapattinam Dt.
- Arulmigu Aranganayagi Samatha Agatheeshwarar Temple, Ananthamangalam, Maduranthagam Tk., Chengalpattu Dt.
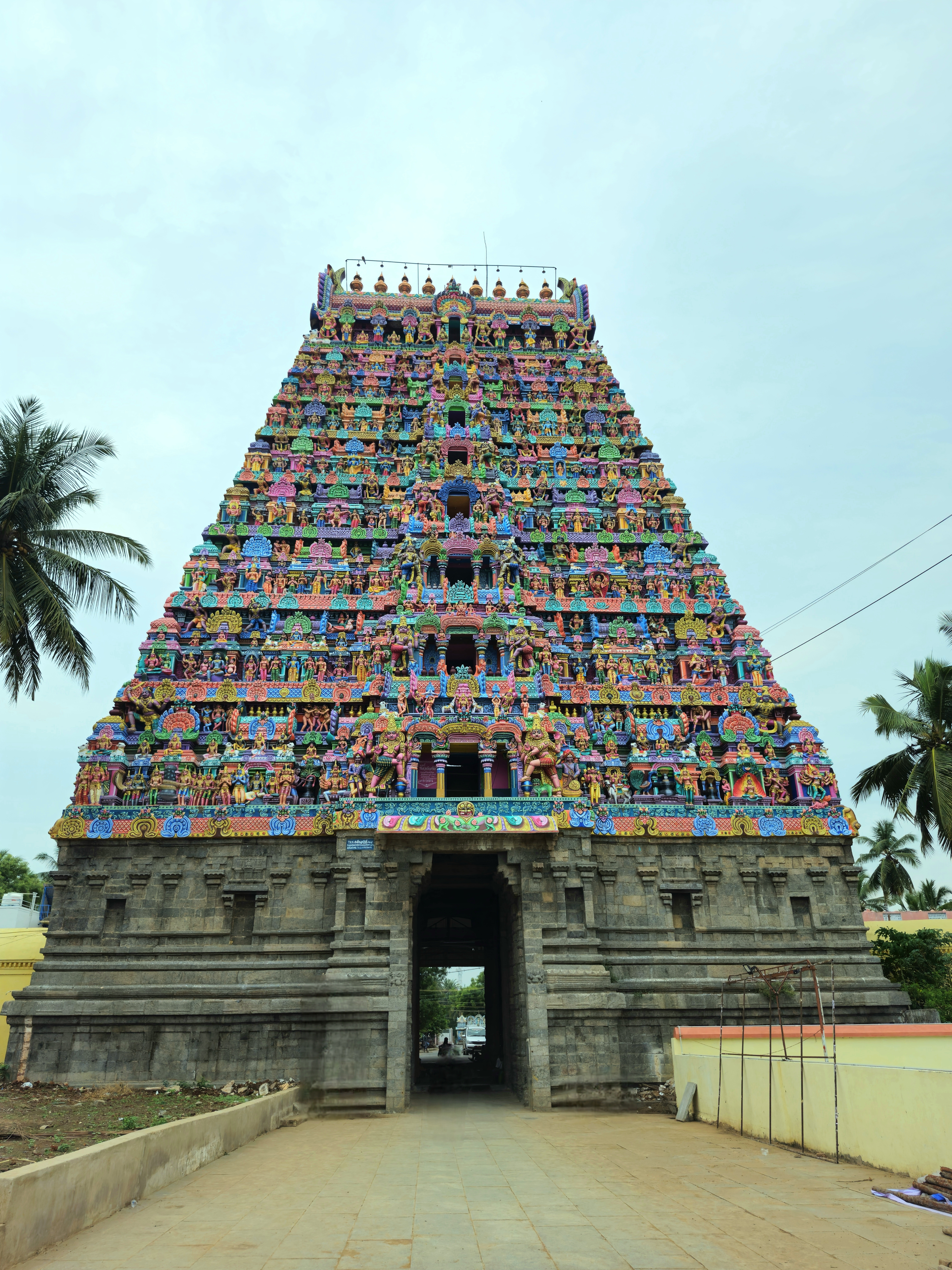
- Mayuranathaswamy Temple, Mayiladuthurai
- Veemeeswarar Temple, Serapanancheri

=== See also ===
- Panchabhootha Sthalangal
- Pancha Sabha Sthalangal
- The Ashta Veeratta shrines

== Temples of Bhairava ==
- Kala Bhairavar Temple, Aathisivan temple, Thandarampattu, Thiruvannamalai.
- Kala Bhairavar, Sattainathar Temple, Sirkali, Mayiladuthurai Dt.
- Bhairavar Temple, Thulla Kattam, Mayiladuthurai
- Yoga Bhairavar Temple, Tiruppathur, Sivagangai Dt.
- Bhairavar Temple, Vairavan Patti, Karaikudi
- Bhairava Moorthi ( Bhairava Natha Moorthi) Temple, Morepalayam, Tiruchengodu
- Bhairaveswarar Temple, Cholapuram, Kumbakonam
- Kalabhairav Temple, Adhiyaman Kottai
- Kala Bhairavar Temple, Achangulam, Pasuvanthanai Taluk
- Sri Bhairavanathaswamy Temple, Thagattur
- Sri kaala bhairavar Temple (Vairavankoil) near Eachangudi Thanjavur Dt
- Astha Bairavar Temple, Aragalur, Attur Tk, Salem Dt.
- Shri Bairavar Rudhra Alayam, Ecchankarunai, Chengalpatu -603003
- Kala Bhairavar Temple, Kshetrapalapuram, Mayiladuthurai
- Swarna Akarshana Bhairavar Temple, Mangaimadam, Mayiladuthurai
- Kala Bhairavar Temple, Kundadam, Tiruppur district
- Bhairavar Temple, Renganathapuram, Bodinayakkanur, Theni dt

== Temples of Hanuman ==
- Anjaneyar Temple, Namakkal- 18 feet single stone sculpture
- Sri Rama Bhaktha Anjaneyar Temple, Ayippettai, Chidamaram
- Anjaneyar Temple, Suchindram, Kanyakumari
- Anjaneyar Temple, Foothills of Nainamalai, Namakkal
- Sri Panchamukha Anjaneyar, Panchavatee, Pondicherry
- Sri Viswaroopa Adhivyadhihara Sri Bhaktha Anjaneya Swamy Temple, Nanganallur, Chennai
- Tirukkatikai Yoga Anjaneyar Temple, Sholingar
- Veera Anjaneya Swami Temple, Mylapore, Chennai
- Sri periya Anjaneyar Temple, Ambur
- Sri Sanjeevi Rayan Temple, Iyengar Kulam, Kanchipuram
- Sri Viswaroopa Panchamukha Anjaneya Swami Temple, Tiruvallur
- Sri Jaya Anjaneya Swami Temple, Karur
- Shri Bhaktha Anjaneyar, Vedasandur, Dindigul
- Sri PunithaPuli Anjaneyar Temple, Paramakudi
- Sri Anuvavi Anjaneya Temple, Coimbatore
- Anjaneyar kovil, Ponneri
- Arulmigu Kadu Hanumatharayar Temple, Dharapuram
- Arulmigu Nava Anjaneyar Temple, Madurai-Dindugul Bye pass, Kulasekarapattinam.
- Sree Moola Anjaneyar Koil, Thanjavur
- Sanjeevirayar Anjaneyar Koil pidampatti Village Mathur post Kulathur tk Puthukkottai dt. near by trichy.
- Shri Rama Baktha Bavya Swaroopa Anjaneyar Temple, BHEL nagar, Medavakkam, Chennai
- Panchamuga Anjaneyar Temple, Gowrivakkam, Chennai
- Sri Guru Hanuman Temple, Vadavalli, Coimbatore

== Temples of Amman ==
- Adhiparasakthi Siddhar Peetam, Melmaruvathur, Kanchipuram
- Koniamman Temple, Coimbatore
- Mariyamman Temple, Kuppuchipalayam, Paramathi Velur, Namakkal
- Angala Parameshwari Temple, Pillur, Namakkal
- Padaivetti Amman Temple, Pillur, Namakkal
- Arulmigu Maha Maariyamman temple, Thenkudi
- Kamakshi Amman Temple, Kanchipuram
- arulmigu sri seethala devi mahasakthi mariamman temple, perumpugalore, thiruvarur.
- Gangai Amman Temple, Gudiyattam |Arulmigu Kodiyidai Nayagi Temple, Thirumullaivoyal]]
- Arulmigu Vanabathrakali Amman Temple, Mettupalayam, Coimbatore
- Adhi Kamakshi Temple, Kanchipuram
- Kamakshi Amman Temple, Mangadu
- Arulmigu Devi Pachaimalai Amman Temple, Thirumullaivoyal
- Arulmigu Vaishnavi Devi Temple, Thirumullaivoyal
- Mandhai Amman Temple, Rayavaram, Pudukkottai
- kalingaiamman, Trichy Kuladevam Kalingaiamman Temple beside Delta Kavery River in front Sriranganathan Temple Srirangam
- Arulmigu Shri Ayirathamman Kovil, Palayamkottai, Tirunelveli
- Shri Anandhavalli sametha Shri Agastheeswarar Temple, Semmangudi, Kudavasal taluk, Tiruvarur district, Tamil Nadu
- Arulmigu Chamundeshwari Amman Temple, Singalandapuram, Thuraiyur taluk, Tiruchirappalli district, Tamil Nadu
- Sri Angalaparameswari Amman Mel Kovil and Kizh Kovil, Kaveripattinam, Krishnagiri Dist. Tamil Nadu
- Shri Anandhavalli sametha Shri Agastheeswarar Temple, Semmangudi, Kudavasal taluk, Tiruvarur district, Tamil Nadu
- Arulmigu Mariamman Temple, Irukkankudi, Virudhunagar Dist, Tamil Nadu.
- Gomathi Amman Temple, Sankarankovil
- Aanangur Ammaicharamman (Mariamman) Temple, Aanangur, Before Pillur, Villupuram, Tamil Nadu.
- Arulmigu Angalaparameswari Aalayam, Chinna Subbarayapillai Street, Pondicherry-1.
- Bannari Mariamman Temple, Bannari, Sathyamangalam
- Chenchadainathar Karunakadakshi Amman Temple, Thirumal Ugandan kotai ( TM Kotai ), Ramanathapuram dist, Tamil Nadu, India
- Arulmigu Masani Amman Temple, Anaimalai (Pollachi)
- Pariyur Kondathu Kaliamman Temple, Gobichettipalayam
- Mariyamman temple, Samayapuram, Tiruchirappalli
- Arulmigu Annai Sri Gowmariamman Temple, Veerapandi, theni Dist, Tamil Nadu.
- PunnaiNallur Mariamman Temple, Thanjavur
- Sholiyamman Temple, Karur
- Golden Temple, Sripuram Sri Laskshmi narayani Temple, vellore District Tamil Nadu
- Arulmigu Gangai Amman Thirukkovil, Santhavasal, Tiruvannamalai District Tamil Nadu
- Arulmigu Devi Karumariamman Temple Thiruverkadu (Chennai)
- Bangaru Kaamaatchiyamman Koil, Thanjavur
- Arulmigu Kottai Mariamman Kovil, Salem
- Sri Ramalinga Sowdambikai Amman Kovil at Raja Street, Coimbatore.
- Kottai Mariamman Kovil, Dindigul
- Sri Poongundra Nayaki Amman Temple, MahibalanPatti(Sivagangai)
- Koppudayamman Koil, Karaikudi
- Kumariamman Koil, Kanyakumari
- Angalaparameswari Koil, Mel Malayanur
- Aathiparashakthi Koil, Mel Maruvathur
- Badrakali Amman Temple, madapuram, Sivagangai District.
- Sree Bhadhrakali Devaswom, Kollencode(Kanniyakumari District)
- Sri Rajarajeshwari Ishakkiamman Trust, Kollemcode (Kanyakumari)
- Mondaicaud Bhagavathi Temple, Mandaicaud (Kanyakumari)
- Muppandal Isakki amman Temple, Muppandal (Kanyakumari)
- Arulmigu Thayamanagalam Muthu Mariamman Kovil, Thayamangalam, Sivagangai District
- Arulmigu kannaparkula peecha vettuva gounder kuladeivam kulavilakkuammankovil, kaalamangalam 'erode ganapathi palayam,
- Arulmigu Mariyamman koil, Alangayam (Vellore)
- Arulmigu Sri Chinna Mariamman Kovil (Kodaikanal) Dindugal District,
- Arulmigu Sri Angalaparameswari Amman kovil, Pappakudi, Near Mukkudal, Tirunelveli Dist. Tamil Nadu
- Arulmigu Sri Mariyamman kovil, திருப்பணிகரிசல்குளம் Thiruppanikarisalkulam, Near Pettai, Tirunelveli Dist, Tamil Nadu .
- Muppidathi Amman kovil, திருப்பணிகரிசல்குளம் Thiruppanikarisalkulam, Near Pettai, Tirunelveli Dist, Tamil Nadu .
- Arulmigu Sri Muttharamman Kovil, Ammandivilai, (Kanyakumari)
- Arulmigu Sri Manathattu Isakkiyamman kovil, Ammandivilai, (kanyakumari)
- Arulmigu Sri Bhavani Amman thriukovil, Preiyapalayam
- Sri Santhanamari amman kovil vickramasingapuram, ambasamudram taluk Tirunelveli
- Ashtalakshmi Kovil, Besant Nagar, Chennai
- Poongavanathamman {Angalaparameswari kovil} Temple, Ramapuram, Putlur, Tiruvallur

== Ayyanarappan Temples ==
- Arunjunai Katha Ayyanar Temple, Melaputhukudi
- Shri Manjaneeswarar Ayyanarappan Temple, Kilputhupattu, Pondicherry.
- Sri Porkilai, Sri Poorani Samedha Kaliyurayan Ayyanarappan Temple, Pillur, Villupuram, Tamil Nadu.
- Sri Ayyanarappan Temple, Kanniakoil, Cuddalore Road, Puducherry.
- Arulmigu Ettimarathumuniappan Temple, Salem.
- Kathukonda Ayyanar Temple, Sundarapandiapuram, Tenkasi, Tamil Nadu
- Arulmigu Siraimeetta Ayyanar Temple, Kottaram, Aavinankudi, Cuddalore.
- Arulmigu Vaagaimarathu Ayyanarappan karuppusamy Temple, Magudanchavadi, Salem.
- Sri vaazl Munishwar Temple, Mannangadu, Thanjavur district.
- Navaladiyan Temple, Mohanur, Namakkal

== Nagarajar Temples ==
- Sangabala Nagarajar Temple, Mohanur, Namakkal

== SaibabaTemples ==
- Mukkan Saibaba Temple, Veeranampalayam, Namakkal
- Saibaba Temple, Thottipatti, Namakkal
- Saibaba temple, Mylapore, Chennai
- Akaraipatti Saibaba Temple, Tenh Shirdi, Trichy

== Chitra Gupta Temples ==
- Chitragupta temple, Kanchipuram
- Chitragupta temple, Chinnandipalayam, Tiruppur

== Cave Temples of Pandiyas ==
- Kandan Kudaivarai - Muruga Temple, Madurai- Period: Pandiya
- Seevaramudaiyar Kudaivarai - Shiva Temple, Pudukkottai- Period: Pandiya
- Pathinen Bhoomi Vinnagaram - Pazhiyili Iswaram - Naarthamalai, Pudukkottai - Period: Pandiya

== Rockcut Monolith Temples of Pallavas ==
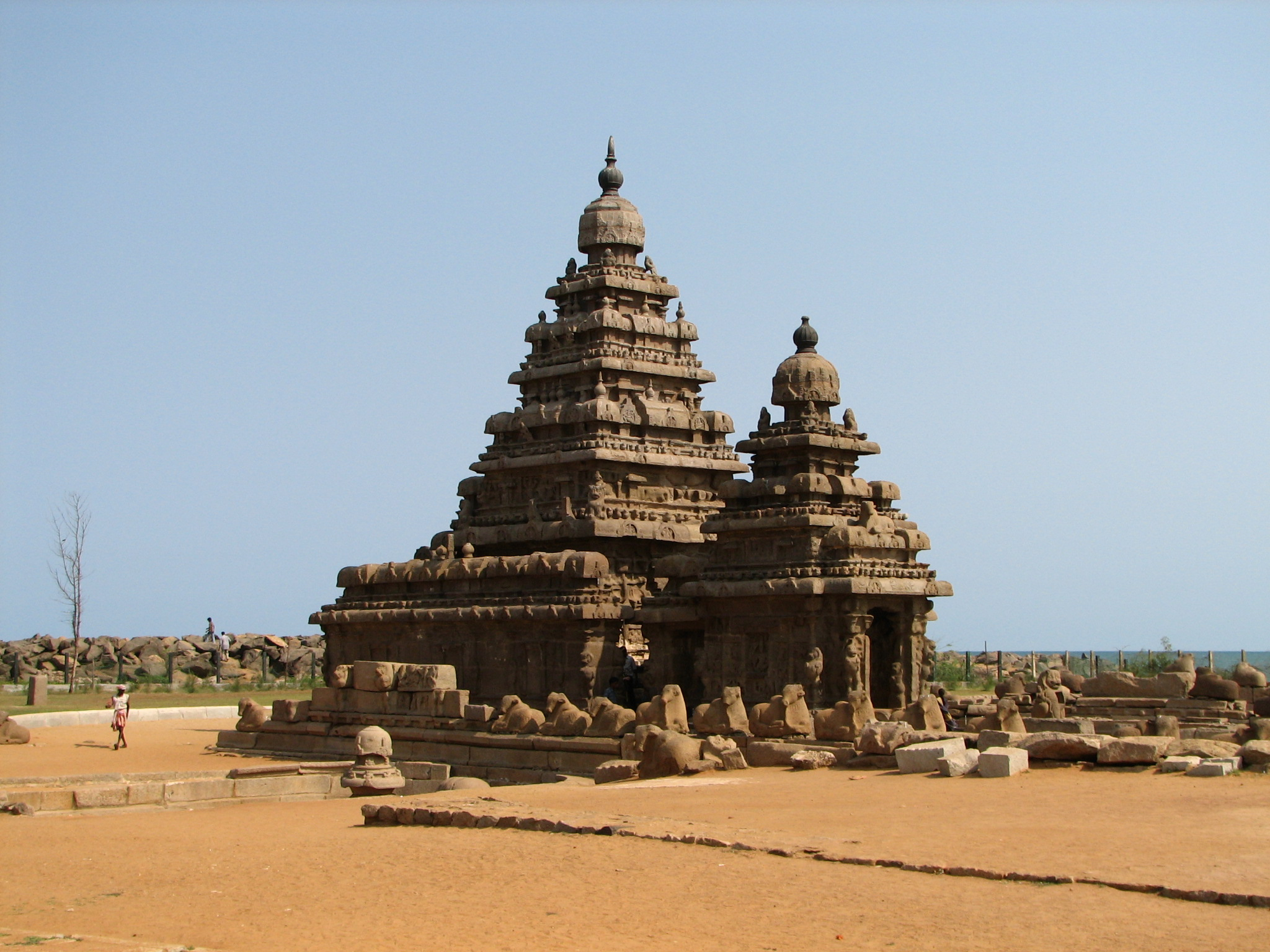
Raajasimmeswaram, Kshatriya Simmeswaram - popularly known as shore temples in Mamallapuram built by Rajasimha Pallava - I. (c. eighth century C.E.)

- Adyantha Kaamam - Dharmaraja Ratha, Mamallapuram - Period: Pallava

== Structural Temples of Pallavas ==
- Kailasanatha Temple - Kancheepuram Dt - Period: Pallava
- Tiruparamechura Vinnagaram - Sri Vaikunda Perumal Temple- Kancheepuram Dt, Period: Pallava
- Iravatanesvara Temple, Kanchipuram
- Raajasimmeswaram / Kshatriya Simmeswaram - Shore Temples, Mamallapuram - Period: Pallava
- Vijayalaya Choleeswaram - Naarthamalai, Pudukkottai - Period: Pallava
- Venkataramana Swamy Temple, Thanthondri malai, Karur - Period: Pallava
- Lakshmi Narashimma swamy Temple, Namakkal - Period: Pallava

== Structural Temples of Vijayanagara ==
- Kanagagiswarar Temple and Sri Periyanayagi Amman Temple- Devikapuram, Tiruvannamalai district - Period: Nayaka
- Sri Neelakanta Pillaiyar Temple-Peravurani, Thanjavur district

== Structural Temples of Chola ==
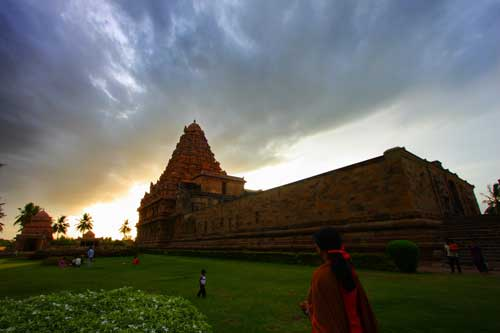
Gangai Konda Cholapuram Temple

- Gangaikonda Cholapuram Temple[Jayankonda cholapuram]ARIYALUR - Period: Chola
- Raajarajeswaram - Peruvudaiyaar kovil or Big Temple, Thanjavur - Period: Chola
- Mayuranathaswami Temple - Mayavaram big Temple, Mayiladuthurai - Period: Chola
- Thayinum Nalla Iswaram - Aaragalur - Period: Chola
- Airavatheeshwarar Temple, Kumbakonam - Period: Chola

== Temples of The Navagrahams ==
The Navagraha temples are a set of nine Hindu temples, each dedicated to one of the nine planetary deities, the Navagraham, in various places around the towns of Mayiladuthurai and Kumbakonam.

S.No	Name of Temple	Name of Deity	Location (Travel Base)	Built around	Notes/Beliefs
1	Suryanaar Temple	Surya (Sun)	Aduthurai (Thanjavur)	1100 CE	This is the only Navagraham temple where the other eight grahams are also present. But, unlike the usual Navagraham arrangement, all other grahams face Surya here
2	Agniswarar Temple	Shukra (Venus)	Kanchanoor (Thanjavur)	600-800 CE	-
3	Kailasanathar Temple	Chandra (Moon)	Tingalur (Thanjavur)		
4	Vaitheeswaran Temple	Mangala (Mars)	Vaitheeswaran kovil (Mayiladuthurai)	600-800 CE	-
5	Tirunageswaram Naganathar Temple	Rahu	Tirunageswaram (Thanjavur)	950 CE	This temple was built by Gandaraditya Chola, son of Parantaka Chola I.
6	Tirunallar Saniswaran Temple	Sani (Saturn)	Tirunallaru (Karaikkal)	-	-
7	Nagannathaswamy Temple	Kethu	Keezhperumpallam (Mayiladuthurai)	-	-
8	Apatsahayesvarar Temple	Guru (Jupiter)	Alangudi (Thiruvarur)	-	-
9	Swetharanyeswarar Temple	Budha (Mercury)	Tiruvenkadu (Mayiladuthurai)	-	-

=== Other Navagraham Temples ===
S.No	Name of Temple	Name of Deity	Location (Travel Base)	Built around	Notes/Beliefs
1	Kuchanuraan Temple, Sri Mayakoothar Devasthanams, Perungulam	Ashtamathu Sani (Saturn)	Kuchanur (Theni)	-	Shani is the main deity in this temple, unlike other temples where he is worshipped either along with other Navagrahams or is worshipped from a shrine that is a part of a bigger temple.
2	Navapasanam Devipattinam Temple	Navagaragam Nine stone	Devipattinam Ramanathapuram(dist)	-	This is one of the Navagaraha temples. This navagaraha are believed to have built by Rama, an avatar of Vishnu.
3	Saneeswarar Tirukkoil	Sani (Saturn)	Tirunaaraiyur a.k.a. Nachiarkoil (Tanjavur)	-	This temple is a part of the Sri Ramanathaswami Temple at Tirunaaraiyur. It is the only temple where Saneeswaran is worshipped along with his two wives Mandhadevi and Jyeshtadevi (also known as Neeladevi) and his two sons, Maandhi and Kuligan.
4	Sri Vasishteswarar Temple	Guru (Jupiter)	Thenkudi Thittai (Tanjavur)	-	Sage Vasishtar is said to have worshipped Shiva in this temple. Brihaspati is worshipped as Guru Bhagavan from a separate shrine here, unlike in Alangudi where he is worshipped as Dakshinamurthi.

== Navagraha Temples of Chennai ==
Chennai has its own set of Navagraha Temples located in and around Kundrathur

- a) Surya - Agastheeswaram at Kolapakkam
- b) Moon - Somanatheeswarar at Somamangalam
- c) Mars - Vaitheeswaran at Poonamalee
- d) Kethu - Neelakanteshwarar at Gerugambakkam
- e) Guru - Ramanadeshwarar at Porur
- f) Sukra - Velleswarar at Mangadu
- g) Budhan - Thirumeyneeswarar at Kovur
- h) Rahu - Thirunageshwaram at Kundrathur
- i) Saneeswarar - Agastheeswaram at Pozhichalur

For detailed write up on these temple refer to page on Kundrathur Ayyanarappan Temples Sri Porkilai, Sri Poorani Samedha Kaliyurayan Ayyanarappan Temple, Pillur, Villupuram, Tamil Nadu. Sri Ayyanarappan Temple, Kanniakoil, Cuddalore Road, Puducherry.

== Sources ==
- Jones, Victoria (2004). Wonders of the World Dot-to-Dot. New York: Sterling Publishing Co., Inc. ISBN 1-4027-1028-3.
- Mittal, Sushil; Thursby, G. R. (2005). The Hindu World. New York: Routelge. ISBN 0-203-67414-6.
- Sircar, D.C. (1979). Some Epigraphical Records of the Medieval Period from Eastern India. Delhi: Shakti Malik. ISBN 9788170170969.
- Vater, Tom (2010). Moon Spotlight Angkor Wat. USA: Perseus Books Group. ISBN 978-1-59880-561-1.
