= Orikkai =

Village in Kanchipuram District, Tamil Nadu, India

Coordinates: 12°48′08″N 79°42′42″E

Orikkai is a village in Kanchipuram district, Tamil Nadu state, India. According to legend it was known in Tamil as Oru Iravu Irikkai, ("overnight stay place") because Vishnu stayed there.

== See also ==
- List of temples in Tamil Nadu
