= Adi Kesava Perumal temple =

Adi Kesava Perumal temple may refer to several places:

- Adikesava Perumal temple, Mylapore, a temple in Chennai, Tamil Nadu, India
- Adikesava Perumal Temple, Paramandur, a temple in Pudukkottai district, Tamil Nadu, India
- Adikesava Perumal temple, Sriperumpudur, a temple in Kanchipuram district, Tamil Nadu, India
- Adikesava Perumal Temple, Thiruvattar, a temple in Kanyakumari district, Tamil Nadu, India
