= Veemeeswarar Temple, Serapanancheri =

Temple in Tamil Nadu, India

Coordinates: 12.87657°N 79.98375°E

Serapanancheri is a small village located near Padappai on the Tambaram-Walajabad road in Kanchipuram district of Tamil Nadu in India. Serapanancheri is famous for its Shiva Temple that dates back to c. 1180 CE and its first inscription starts with Chola King Kulothunga III. The main deity of the temple is lord Veemeeswarar (originally believed to be Lord Vinmeeneswarar) who is the ruler of all 27 star constellations.

Legend has that Lord Surya (The Sun God) worships Shiva at this place regularly. The Veemeeswarar temple is also believed to be visited by numerous sages, and siddhas. Lord veemeeswarar is accompanied by her consort Swarnaambigai. Two nandis serve the lord here, instead of one. Lord Surya (The Sun God) stands behind the nandi, as a worshipper of lord Shiva.

As in all other Shiva temples, Pradhosham and Shiva rathri are celebrated here by the locals regularly. The temple is also surrounded by three theerthas (sacred tanks) - Agni Theertham, Brahma Theertham and Vishnu Theertham. The tanks currently dried up, but may re-appear during rainy seasons.

Veemeeswaram temple architecture is partly destroyed on the outer side, but the inside sanctum, and the deities remain intact. In fact the shiva lingam is much bigger than in many other places, and presents a pleasant view for the bakthas. Goddess Swarnambigai resides next to Lord Veemeswarar, and the goddess too sits inside the main sanctum.

Veemeeswarar sametha Swarnambigai Koil, Serapanancheri is said to be a temple visited by many yoga purushas, and is a place of true divine manifestation.

== See also ==
- List of Hindu temples in Tamil Nadu
