= Andalukkum Aiyan Temple =

Andalukkum Aiyan Temple is a Hindu temple located in the town of Adhanur in the Thanjavur district of Tamil Nadu, India. The temple is dedicated to Vishnu.

== History ==
According to legend, the Vaishnavite saint Thirumangai Alwar had exhausted all his money in the renovation of the Ranganatha Temple, Srirangam. When the workers who constructed the temple demanded their wages, he was unable to pay them. Vishnu, however, appeared to him in a dream and directed him to go to the banks of the Kollidam River. As instructed, Thirumangal Alwar travelled to the banks of the Kollidam and at Adhanur, he was met by a rich merchant who provided the money to pay the workers.

== Significance ==
Thirumangai Alwar had sung praises of the temple in his Mangalasasanam. The temples is one of the 108 Divya Desams.
