= Ratnagiri Murugan Temple =

Temple in Tamil Nadu, India

Coordinates: 12.941196°N 79.244952°E

Arulmigu Ratnagiri Balamurugan temple is a temple dedicated to the Hindu deity Murugan (Kartikeya), in Thirumanikundru, Ratnagiri, Ranipet district, India. It was constructed around the 14th century, and was mentioned by the contemporary poet Arunagirinathar. It is situated on a hilltop, in accordance with ancient Hindu scriptures which say that where there is a hill, there is Murugan.

Devotees believe that the Murugan idol in the shrine and the guru Swami Balamurugan Adimai (born 1941) are manifestations of the deity.

== Days of importance in the calendar year ==
- Tamil New Year Day
- Ādi Krittikai celebrations (Lord Murugan's Birthday)
- Ādi Velli (auspicious Friday in the month of August or September)
- Kanda Shashti celebrations (Six Days)
- Navaratri (Nine Nights of the Goddess Festival)
- Panguni Uttiram
- January 1
- The anniversary of Swamiji Balamurugan Adimai's enlightenment - 20 March
