= Manakula Vinayagar Temple =

Hindu Temple in Tamil Nadu, India

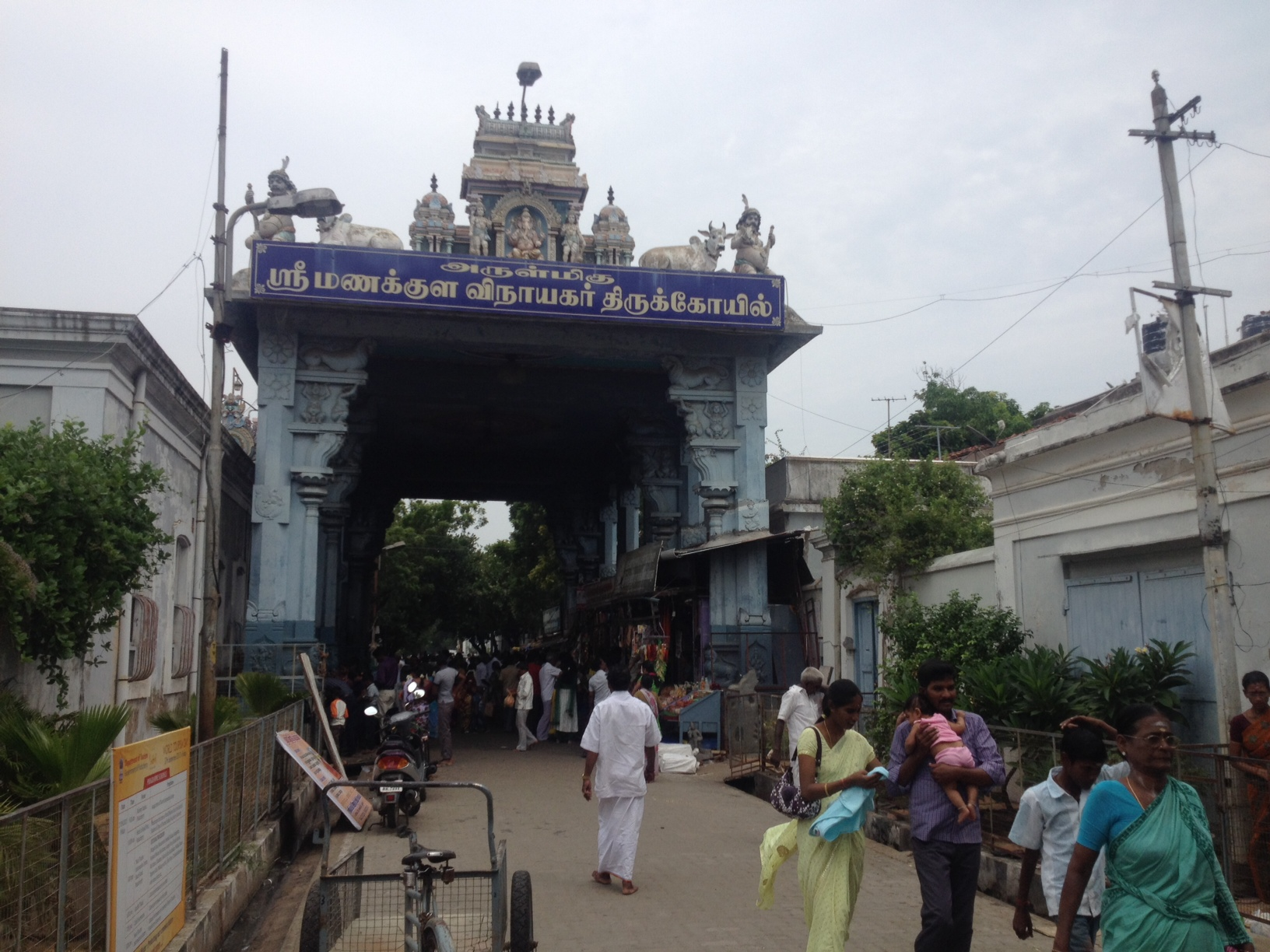
- Manakula Vinayagar temple. North entrance

- Manakkula Vinayagar Temple, Puducherry, India

Religion
- Affiliation: Hinduism
- District: Puducherry
- Deity: Lord Ganesa

Location
- Location: Puducherry
- State: Union Territory of Puducherry
- Country: India
- Interactive map of Manakula Vinayagar Temple
- Coordinates: 11°56′09″N 79°50′01″E

Architecture
- Elevation: 35.38 m (116 ft)

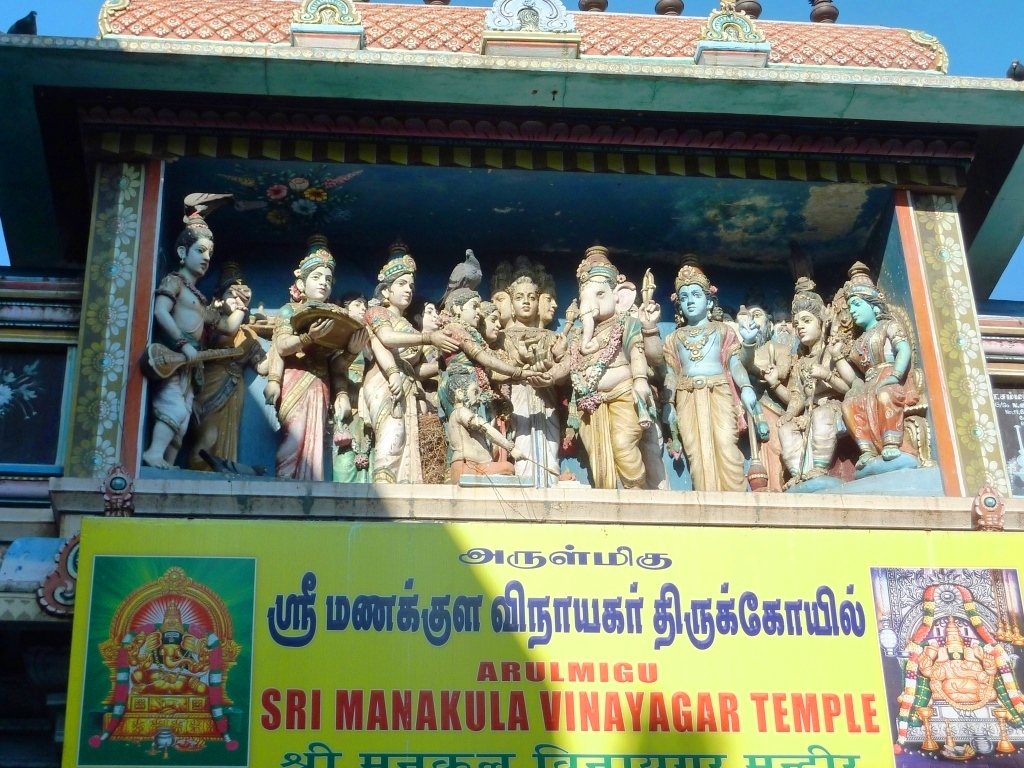
Manakula Vinayagar Temple. Near Pondicherry, 2010

Manakula Vinayagar Temple (French: Temple de Manakula Vinayagar) is a Ganesha temple in the Union Territory of Puducherry, India. Dedicated to the god Ganesa, it is a popular pilgrimage site and tourist destination in Puducherry. The temple is of considerable antiquity and predates French occupation of the territory. During the tenure of Dupleix, there were attempts to destroy the temple, but it was spared owing to strong protests from the Hindu population and the threat of British and Maratha invasion of the territory.

== Location ==
The Manakula Vinayagar Temple is one of the ancient temples in Puducherry, a Union Territory situated in the southern part of the Indian sub-continent. The temple is 400 meters West of the Bay of Bengal, 165 km South of Chennai (Capital of Tamil Nadu State), 23 km of North of Cuddalore and 35 km East of Viluppuram, Tamil Nadu. The main deity of this temple, "Manakula Vinayagar" (Pranavamurthy), is facing east. The temple was once bordered on the east side by Orlean Street (Now Manakula Vinayagar Koil Street), south by Jawaharlal Nehru Street, north by Law-de-Louristhon street and west by a canal running north–south.

Temple was renovated in 2015.

It is highly frequented by tourists, being just 10 minutes walk from the famous beach road facing the Promenade Beach of Pondicherry.

== Specialty ==
The Manakula Vinayagar Temple, in Puducherry, is a temple, dedicated to the Hindu god Ganesha.

== Golden Chariot ==
The golden chariot was made purely on the basis of collection of donations from the devotees. The total weight of the gold used in this chariot is 7.5 kg with the estimate of around Rs.35 lakhs. The height and breadth of the chariot is 10 ft & 6 ft. The chariot was fully made up in teakwood covered by copper plates duly engraved with beautiful art works and the plates duly attached with golden rakes. At first the running of the said Golden Chariot was held on 05-10-2003 in a grand manner. At present most of the devotees are very much interested to fulfill their prayer by pulling the Golden chariot inside the temple on payment of fixed fees. Once in year i.e. on Vijayadhasami day the said Golden Chariot run outside of the temple i.e. only in the maada veedhis.

=== Thollaikkathu Siddar ===
Nearly 300 years before a saint (referred as Siddar in Tamil language) standing 6 ft tall said to have got enlightenment from this deity and attained Samadhi in this temple. From then on people bring their new born here for worship before going to any other temple.

== Scholar works about the temple ==
1. Mahan Vanna Sarabam Dhandapani Swamigal has sung Sthothira Parthigam on Lord Manakula Vinayaga Peruman.
2. Sri V. M. Subramania Iyer has written "Puduvai Manakula Vinayagar Suprapatham."
3. Also some 100 years back Puduvai Mahavidvan Sri P. A. Ponnuswamy has written "Manakula Vinayagar Nanmani Malai" for which Tamil teacher Sri Ellapillai has written a support poem "Vedapuriyil Vilangum Mankulthu Nathan".
4. Puduvai Nellithope Sri G. Ramanuja Chettiar has written and released in "Sri Manakula Vinayagar Parthigam".
5. Subramania Bharathi has sung about Manakula Vinayagar in "Vinayaga Naanmani Maalai"

== Gallery ==
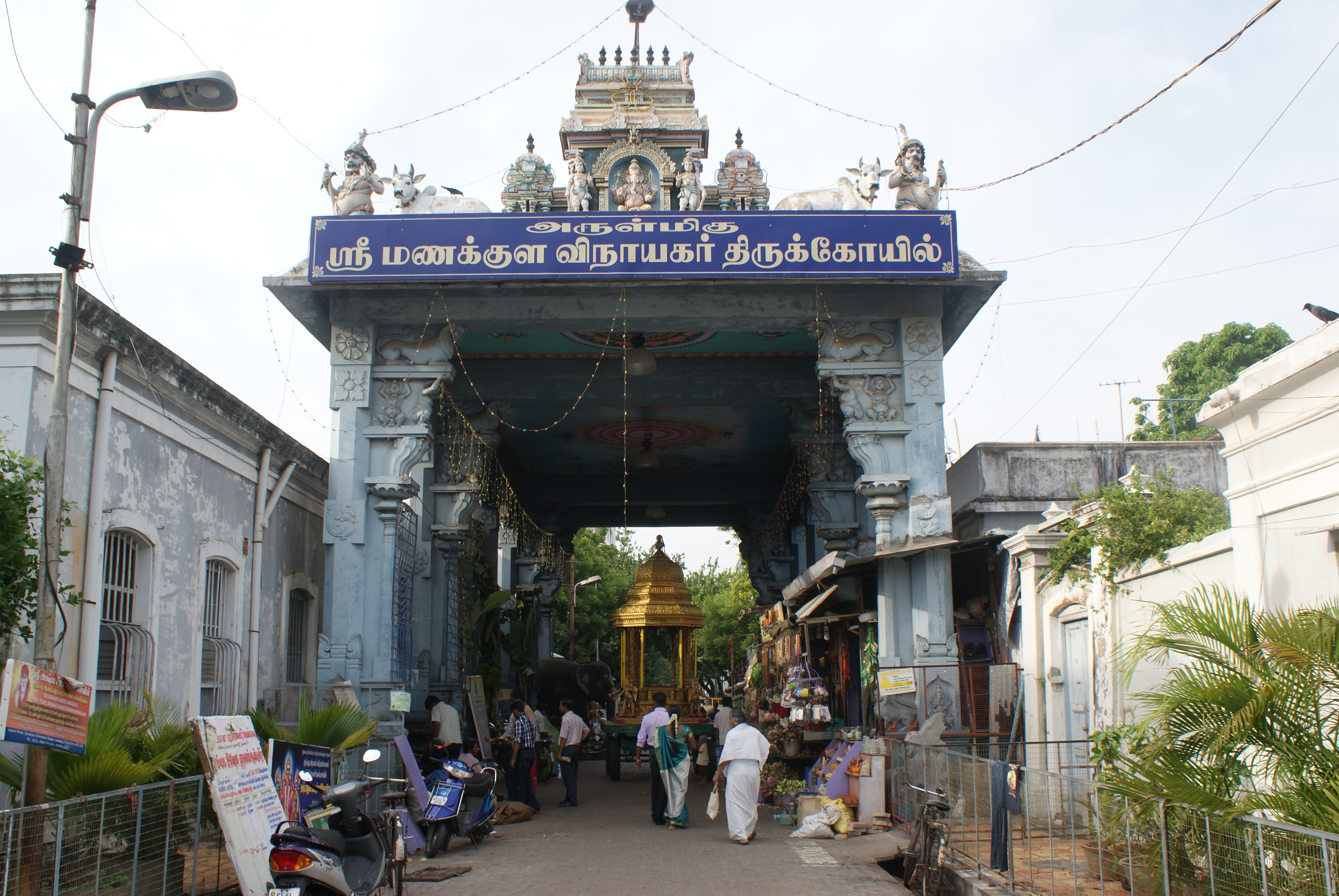
Gate leading into the Temple.

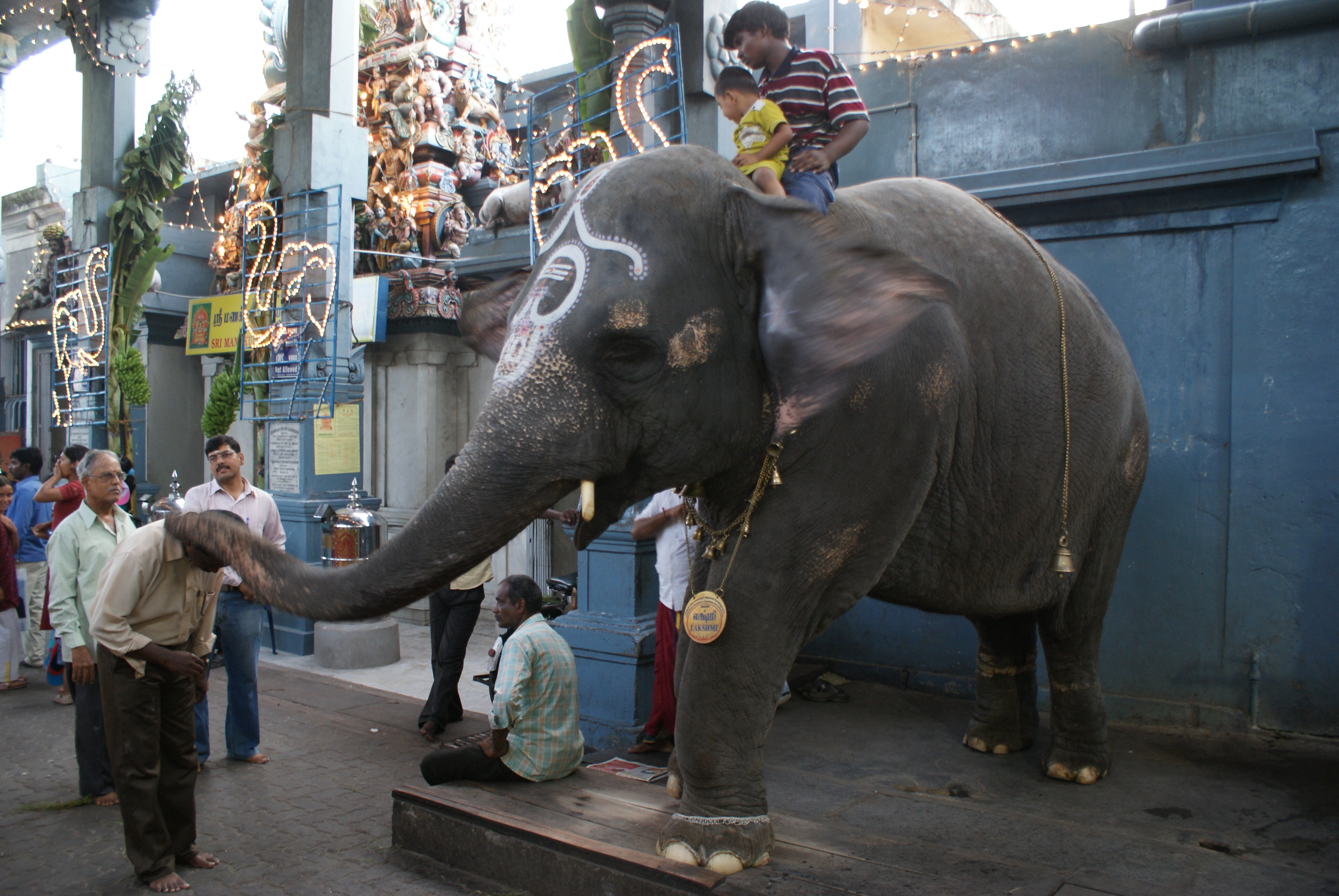
The Temple elephant "Lakshmi", that gives blessings to visitors.

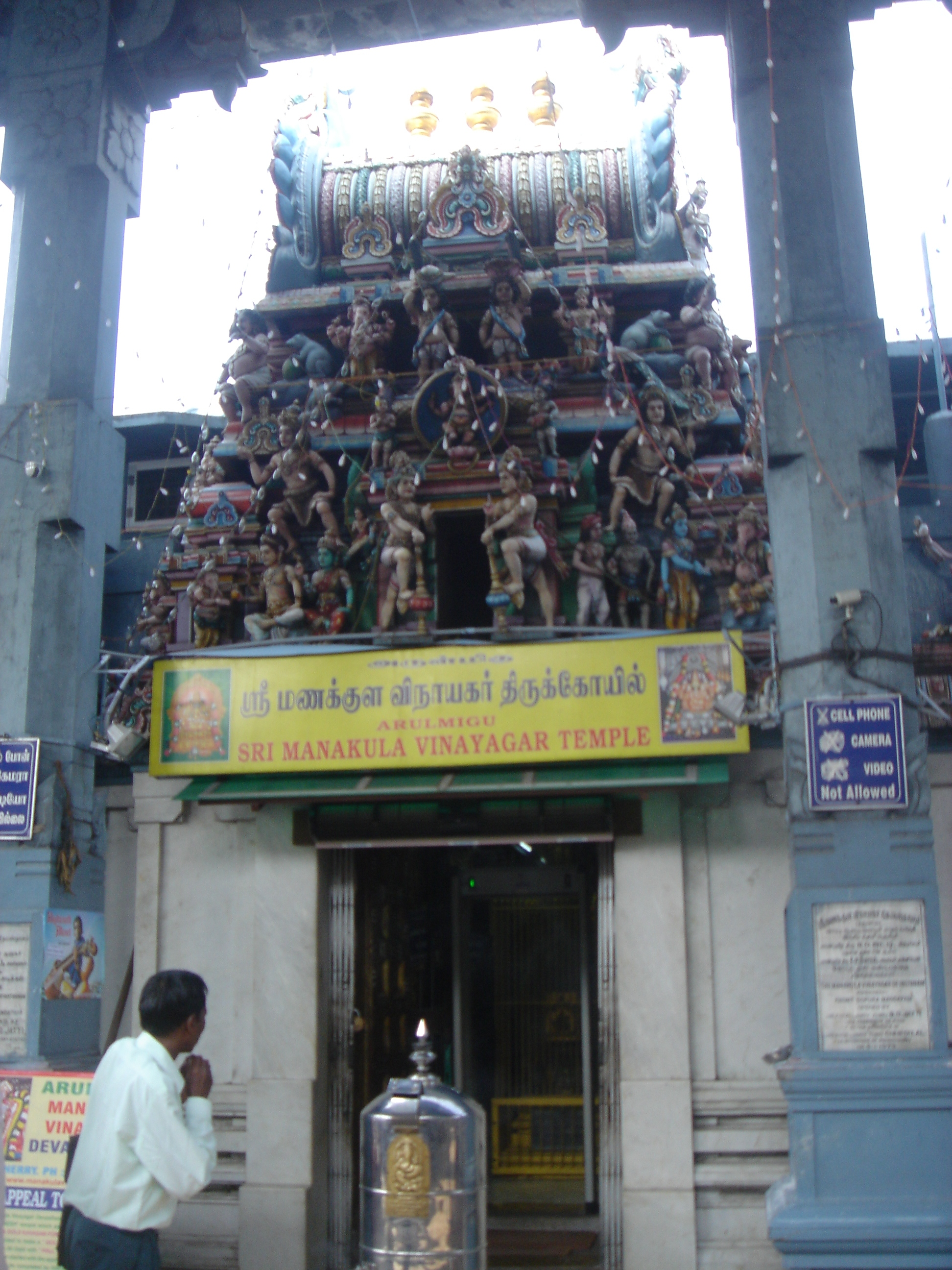
Part of the temple interior, showing many carved figures above a shrine.

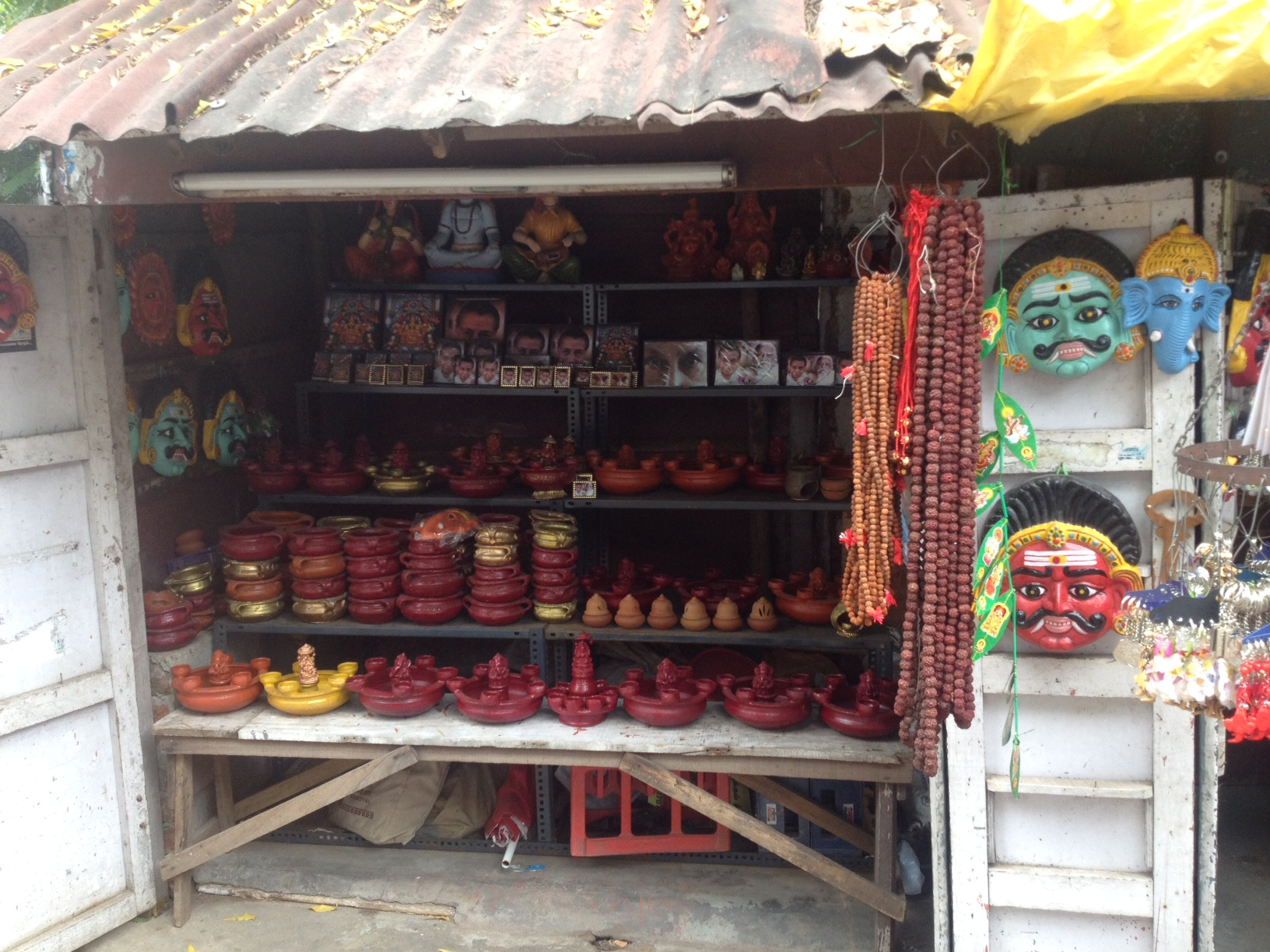
Shops near manakula vinayagar temple

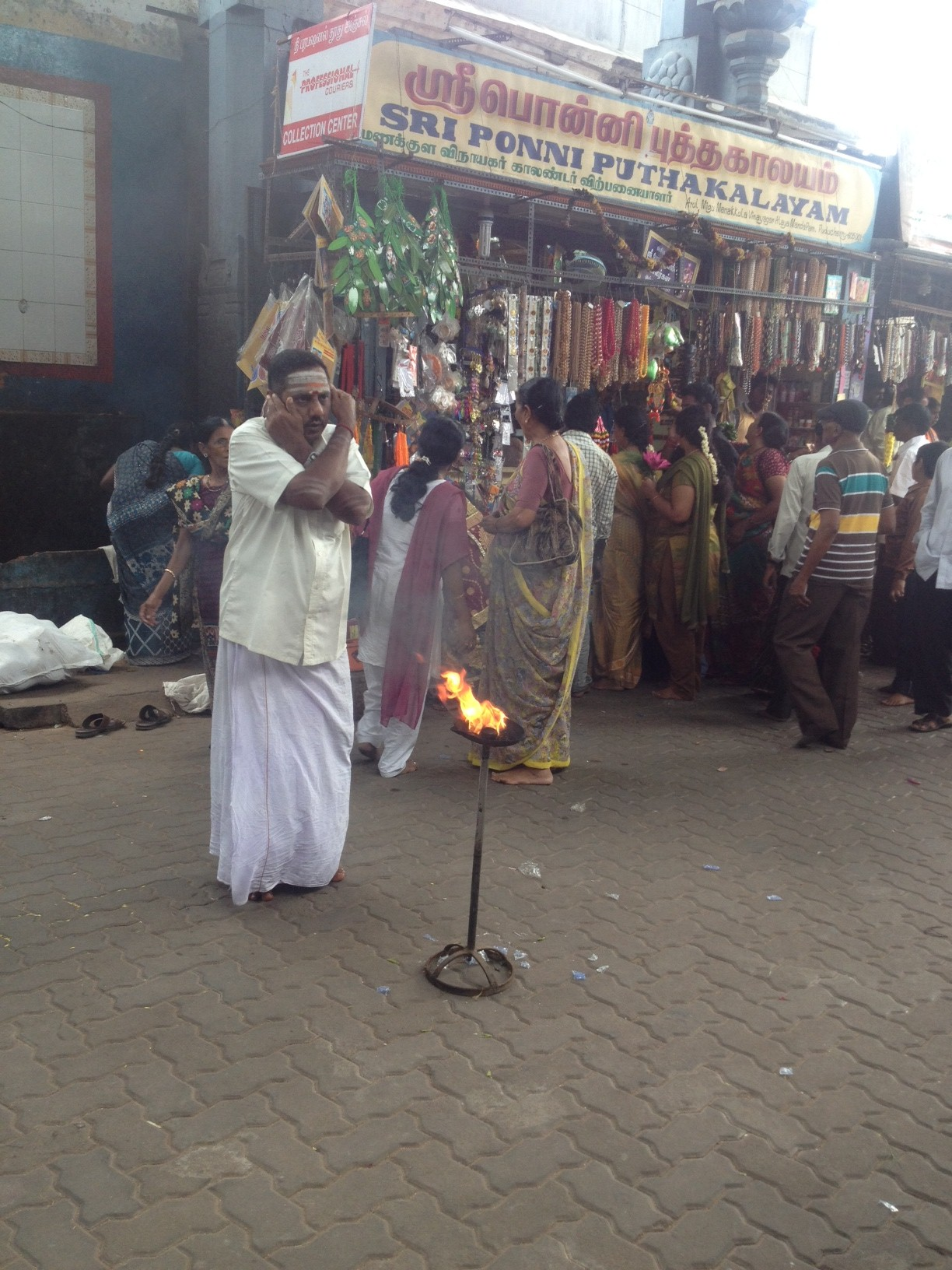
A devotee at manakula vinayagar temple

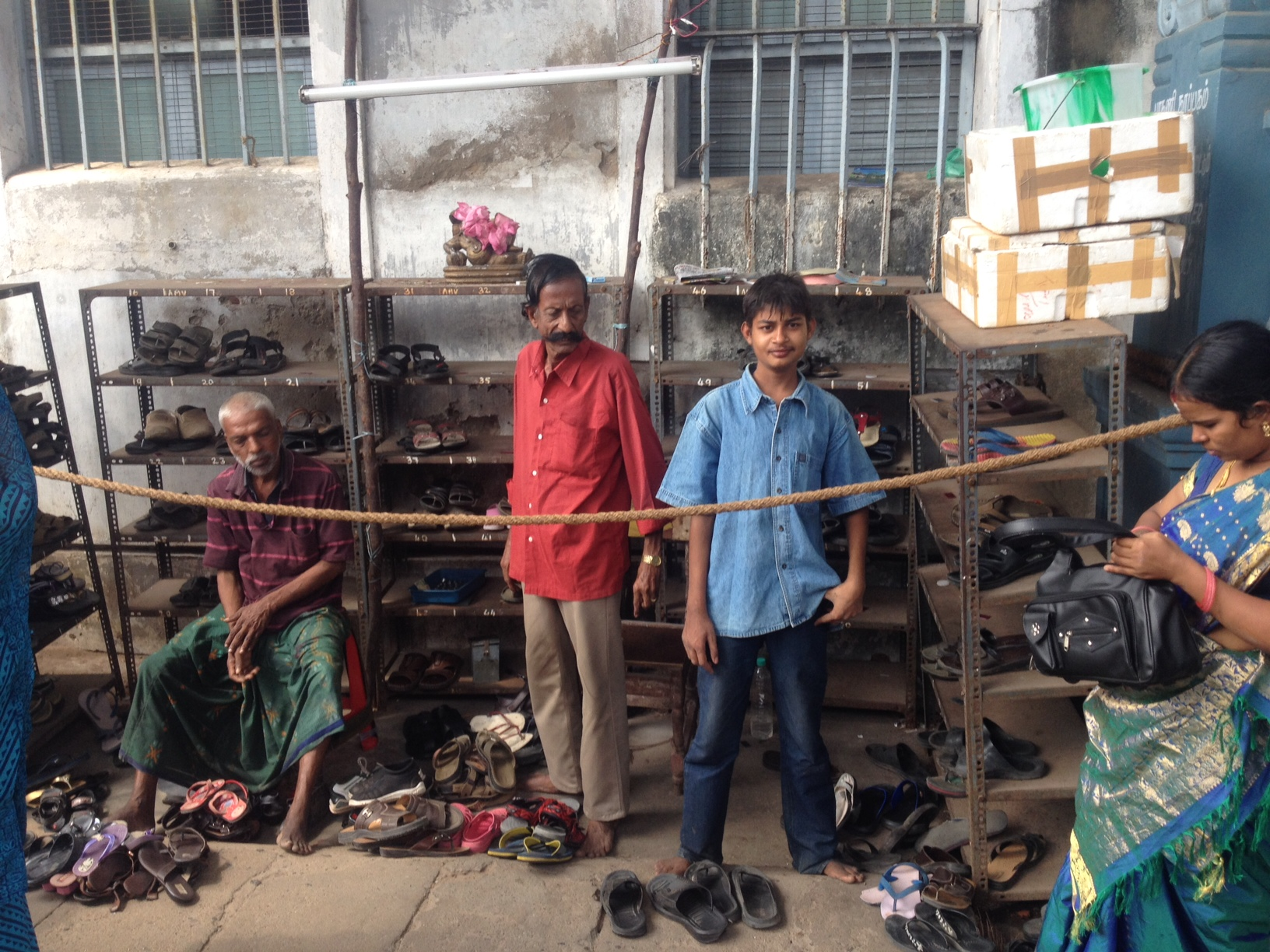
Devotee footwears stands are guarded safely until they complete the rituals in the temple at manakula vinayagar temple

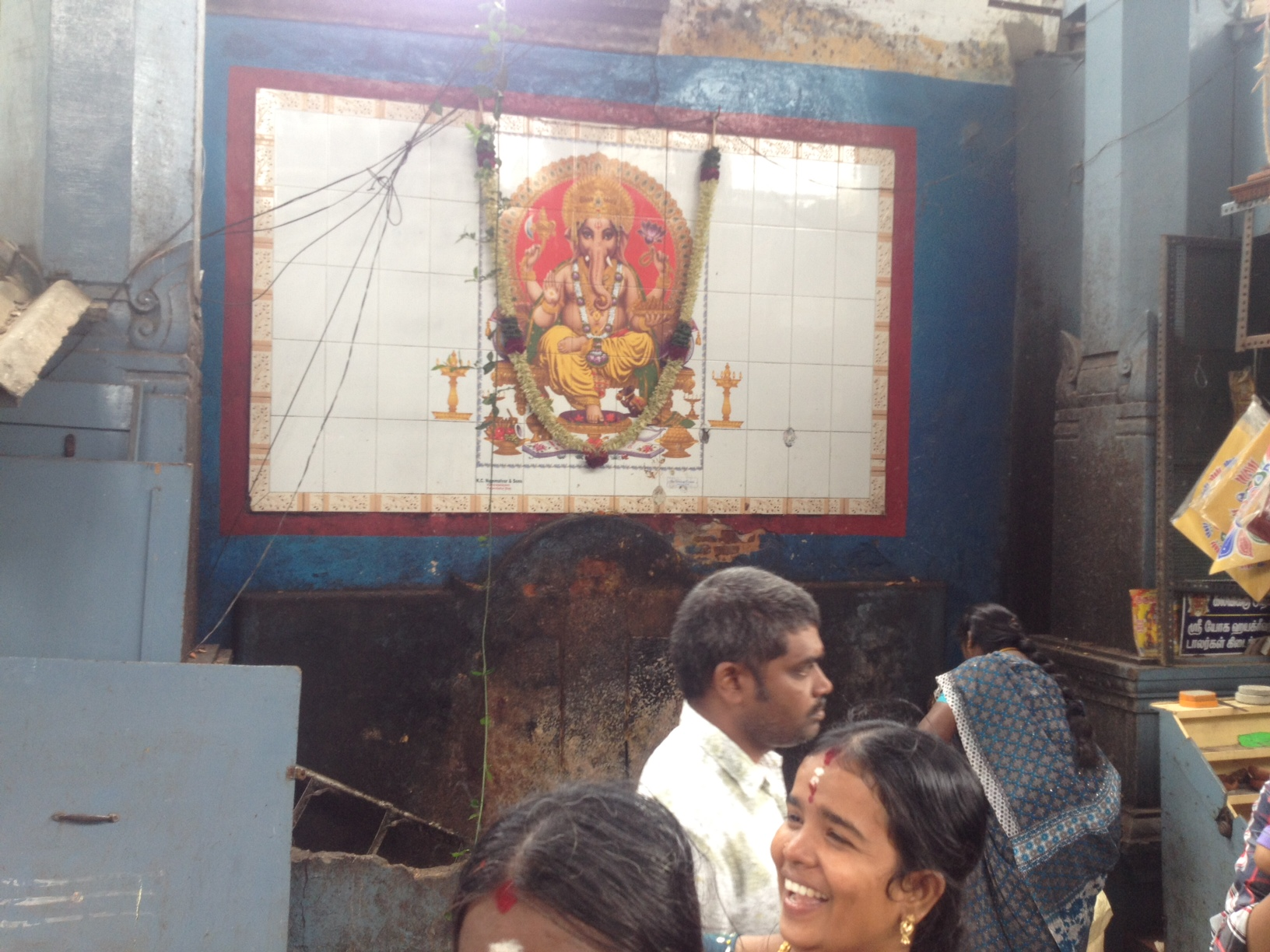
Coconut breaking point at Manakula vinayagar temple

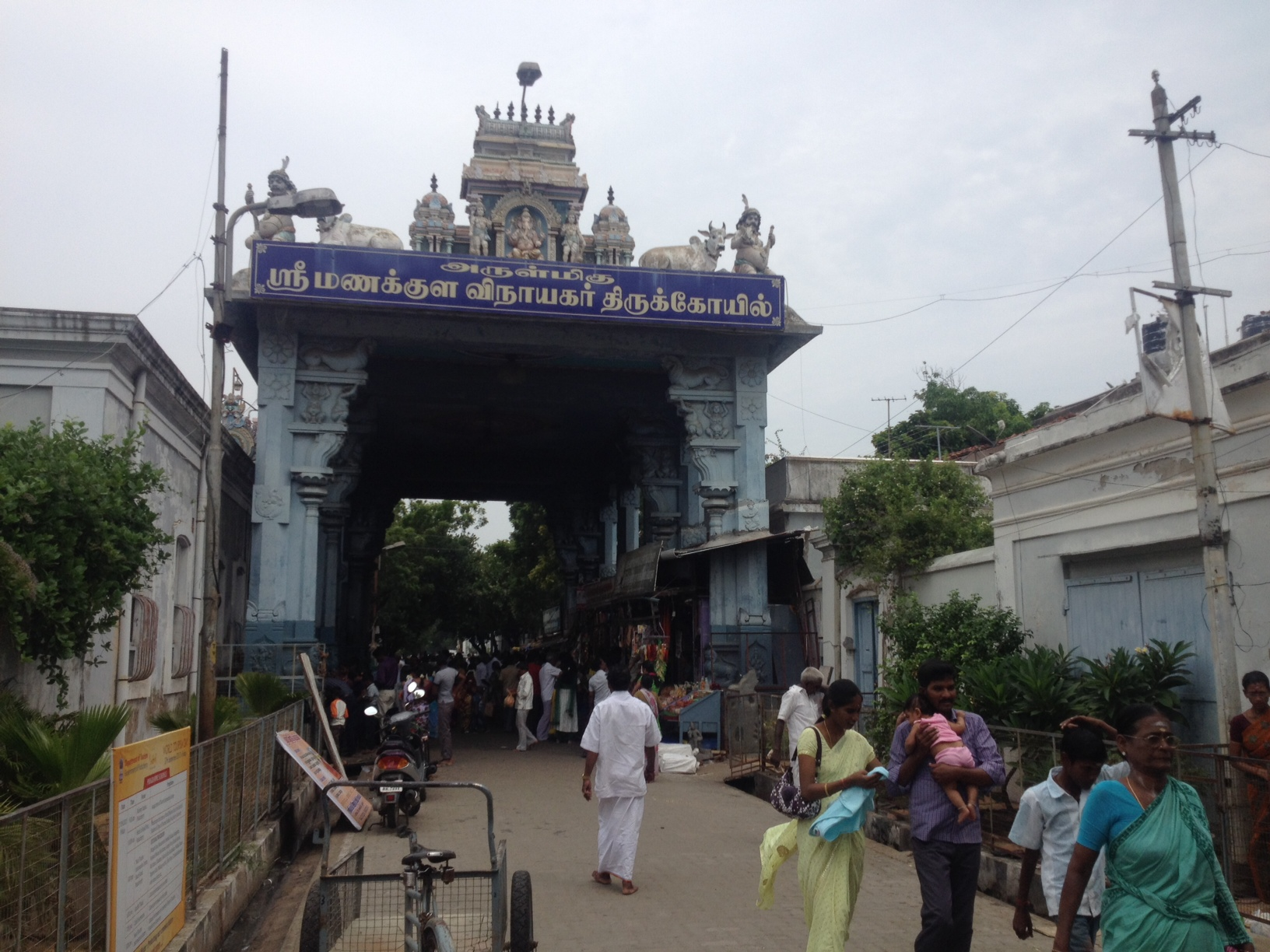
Manakula vinayagar temple north entrance

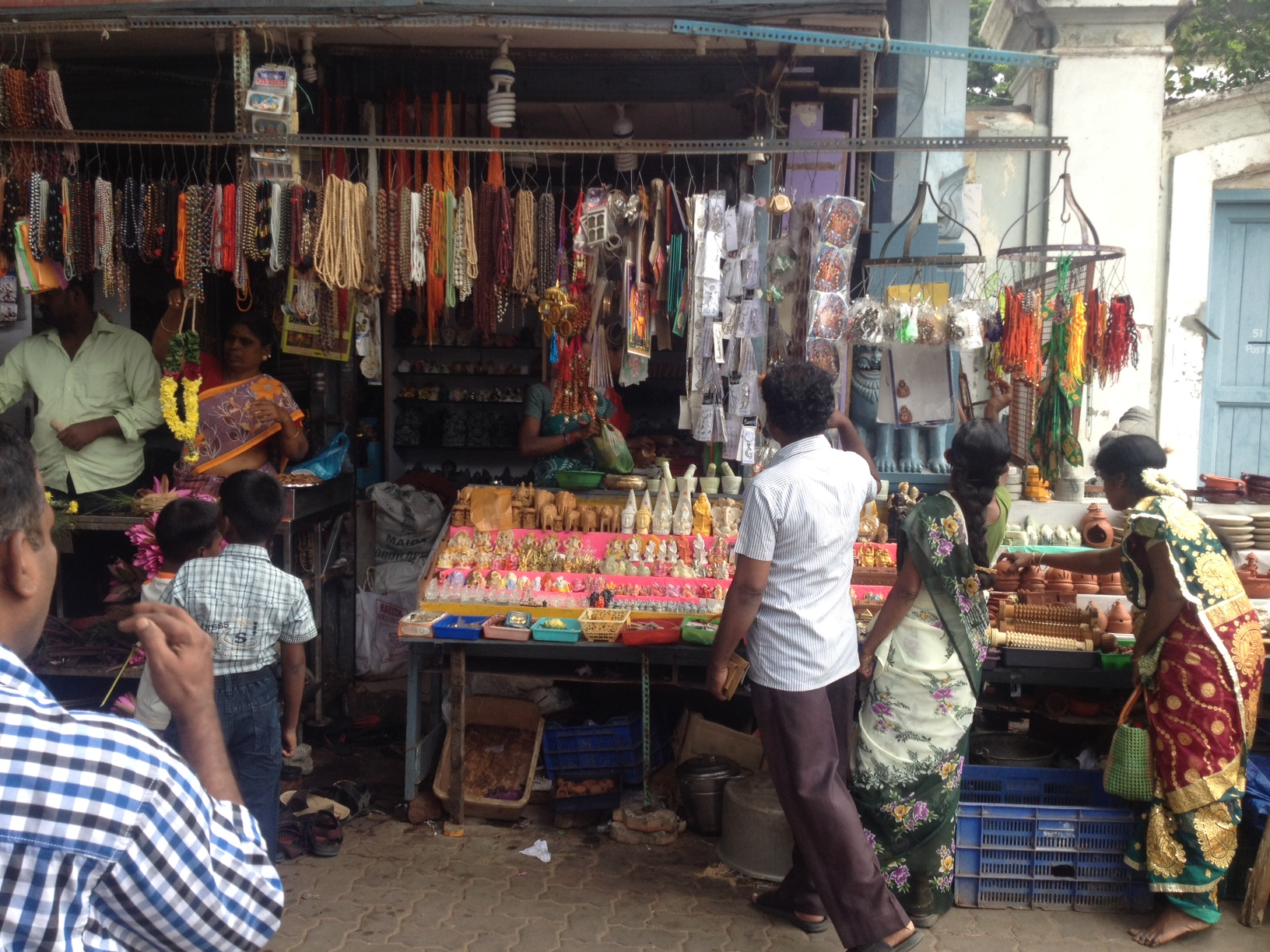
Spiritual shops at Manakula vinayagar temple

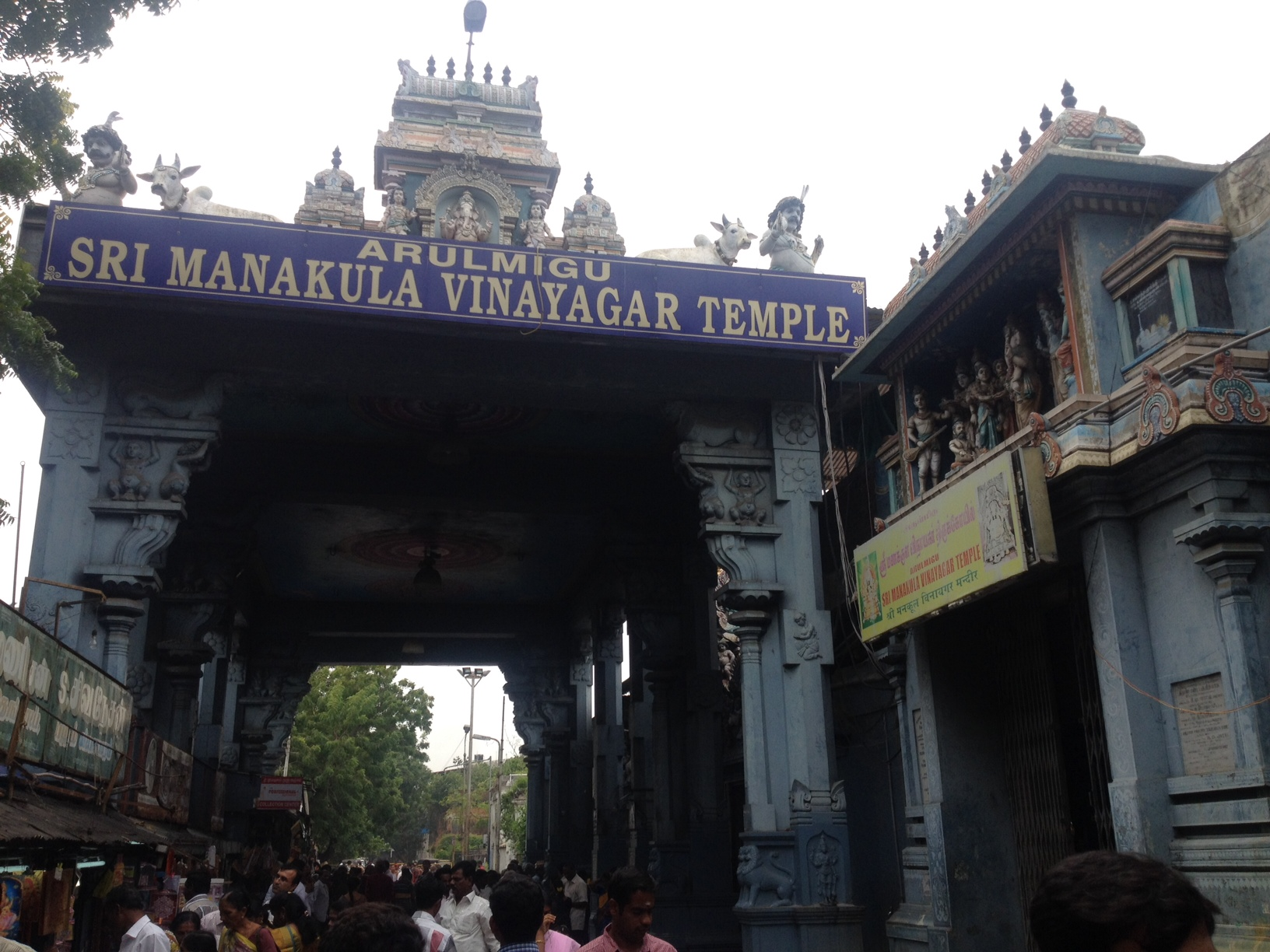
Manakula Vinayagar temple south entrance

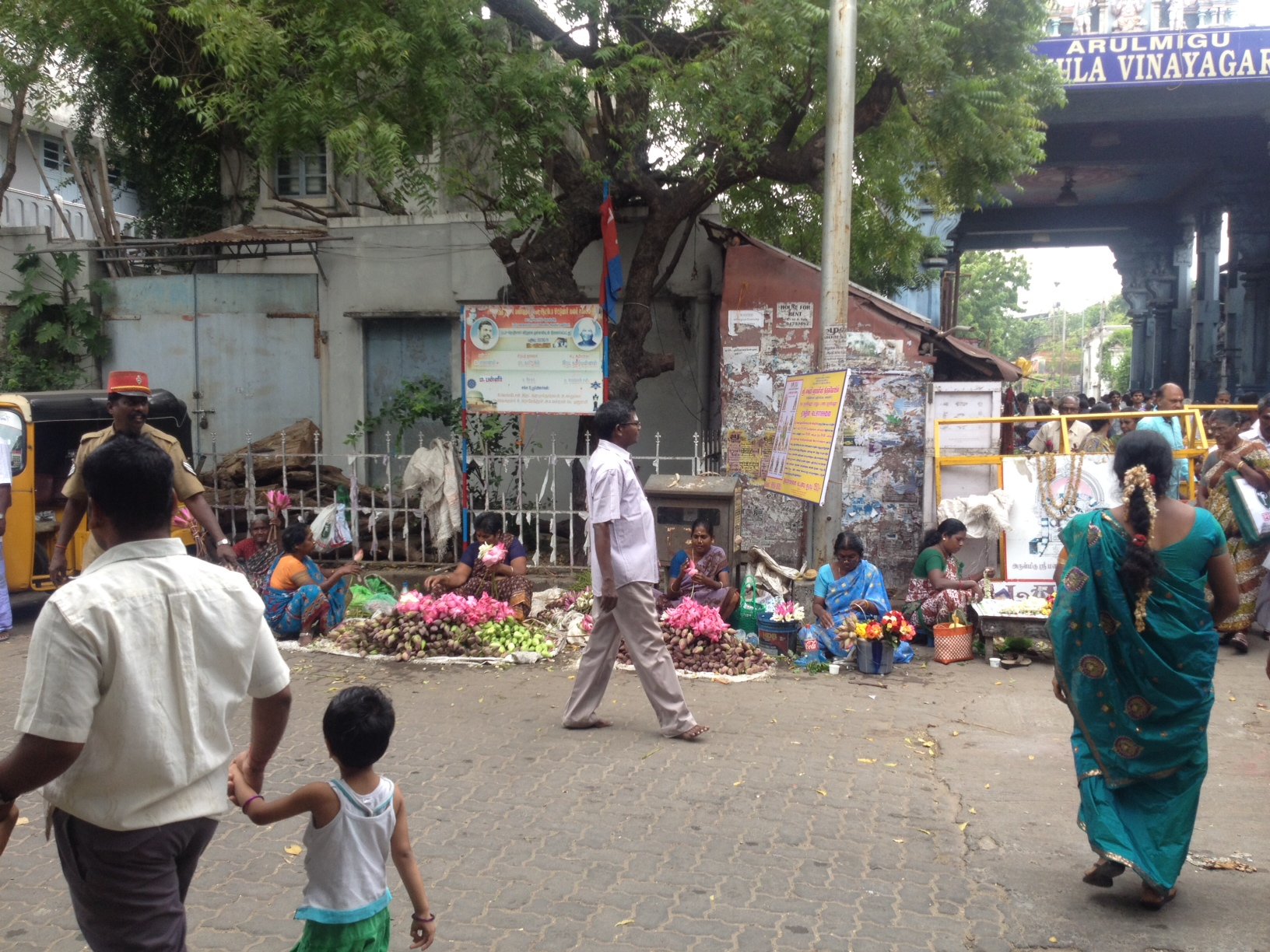
Manakula Vinayagar Temple

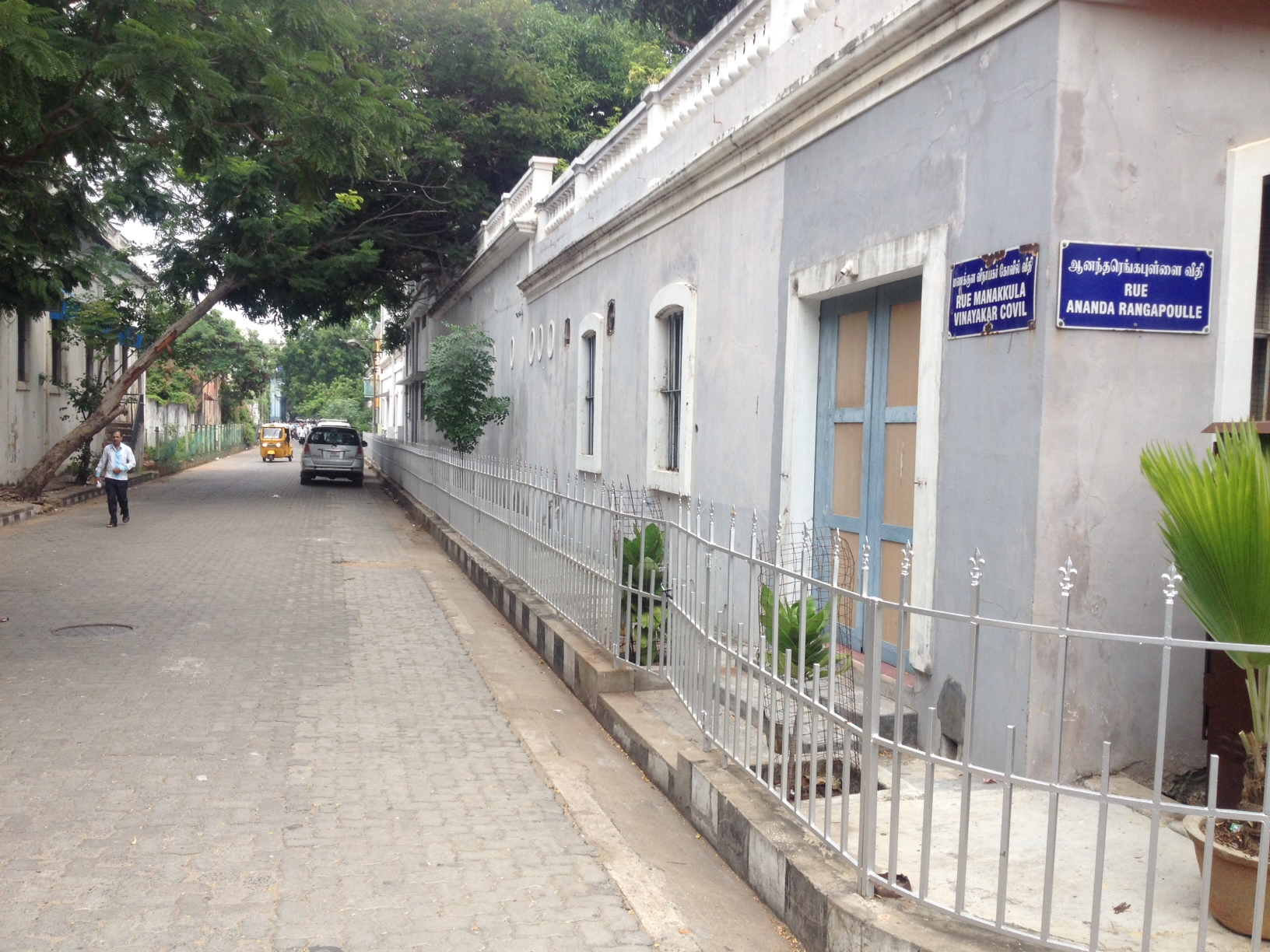
Manakula Vinayagar Temple street name in French and Tamil language

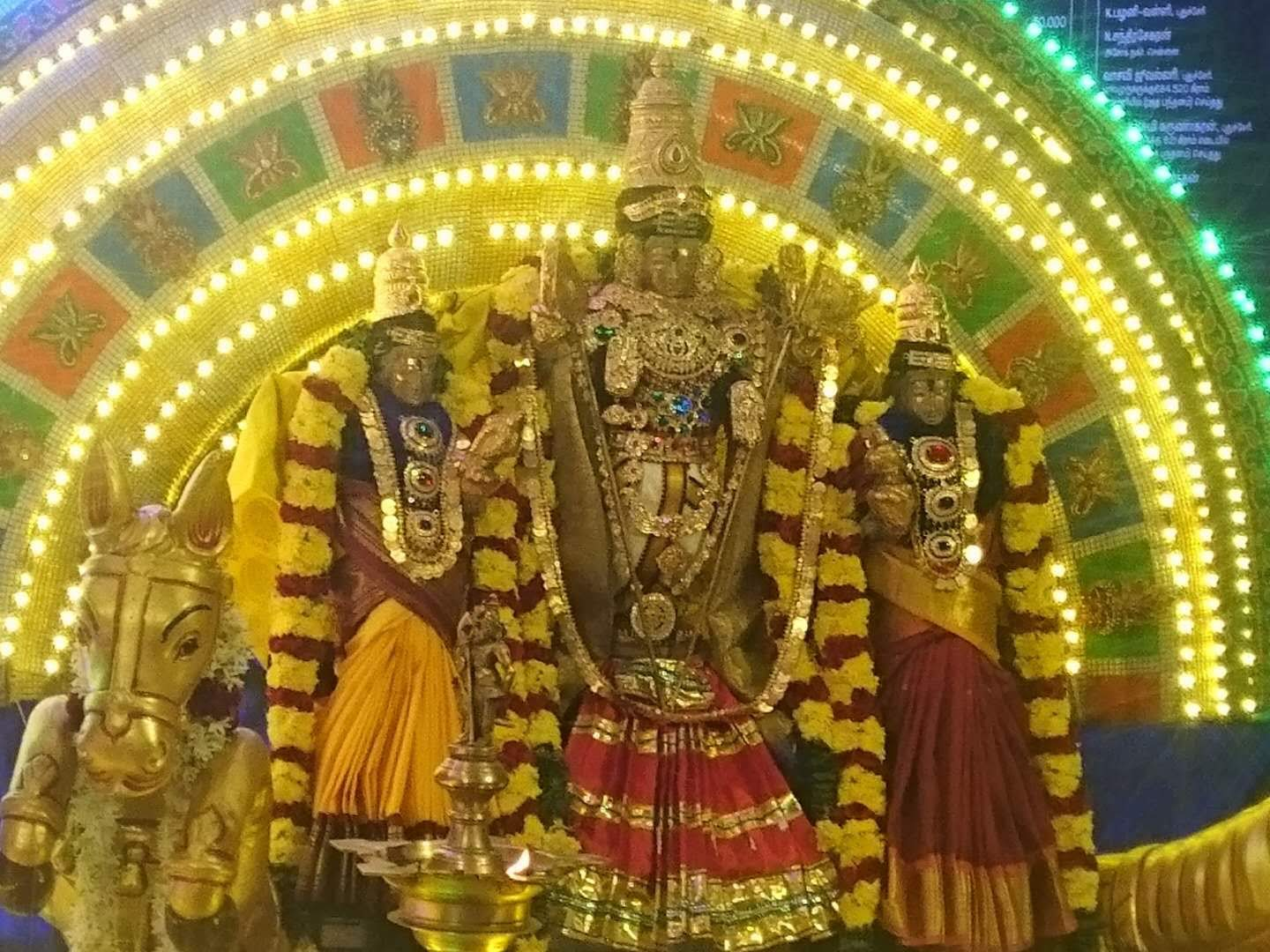
Manakula Vinayagar Temple Urchavar - 1.

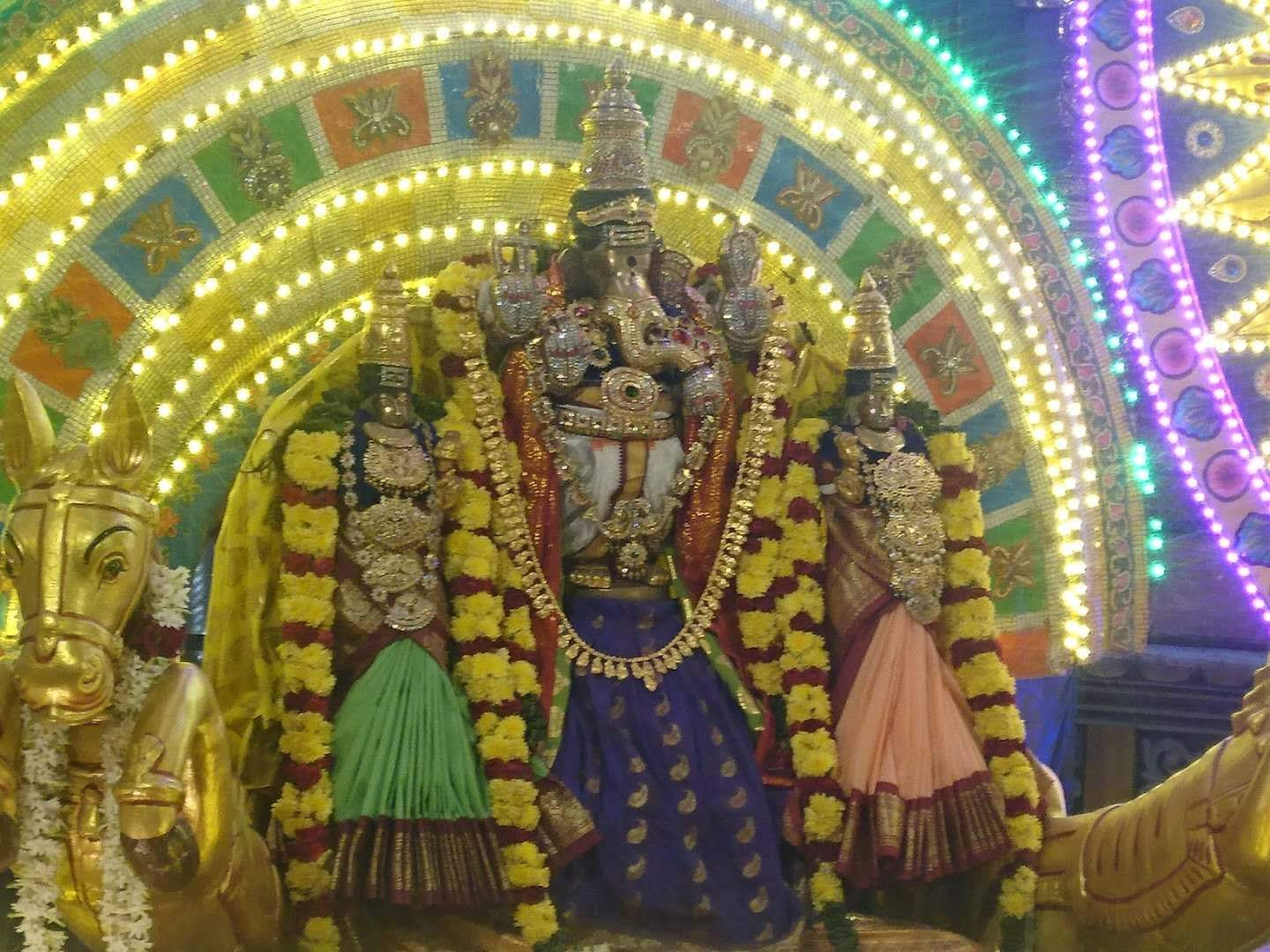
Manakula Vinayagar Temple Urchavar - 2

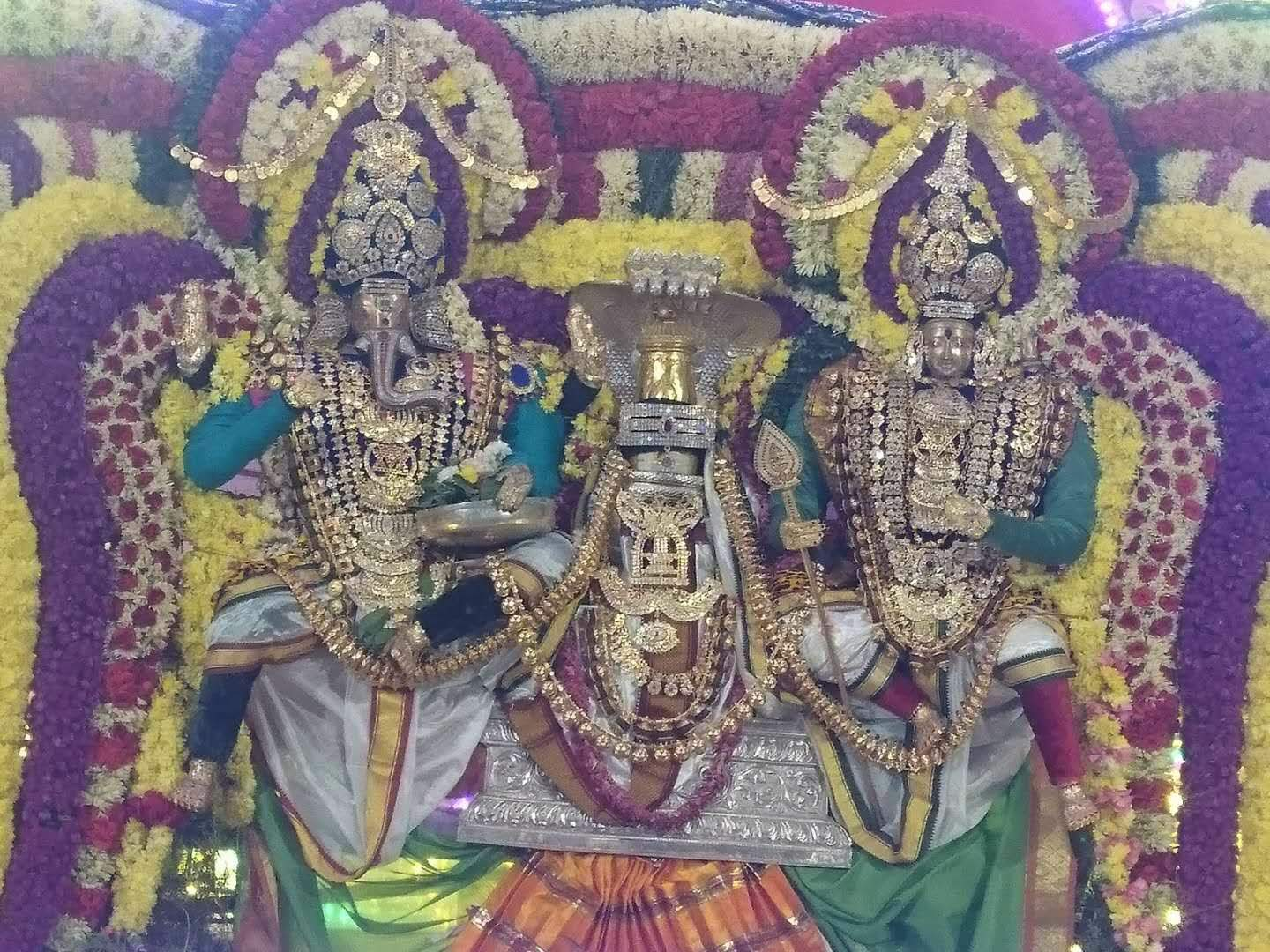
Manakula Vinayagar Temple Idols of Worship]

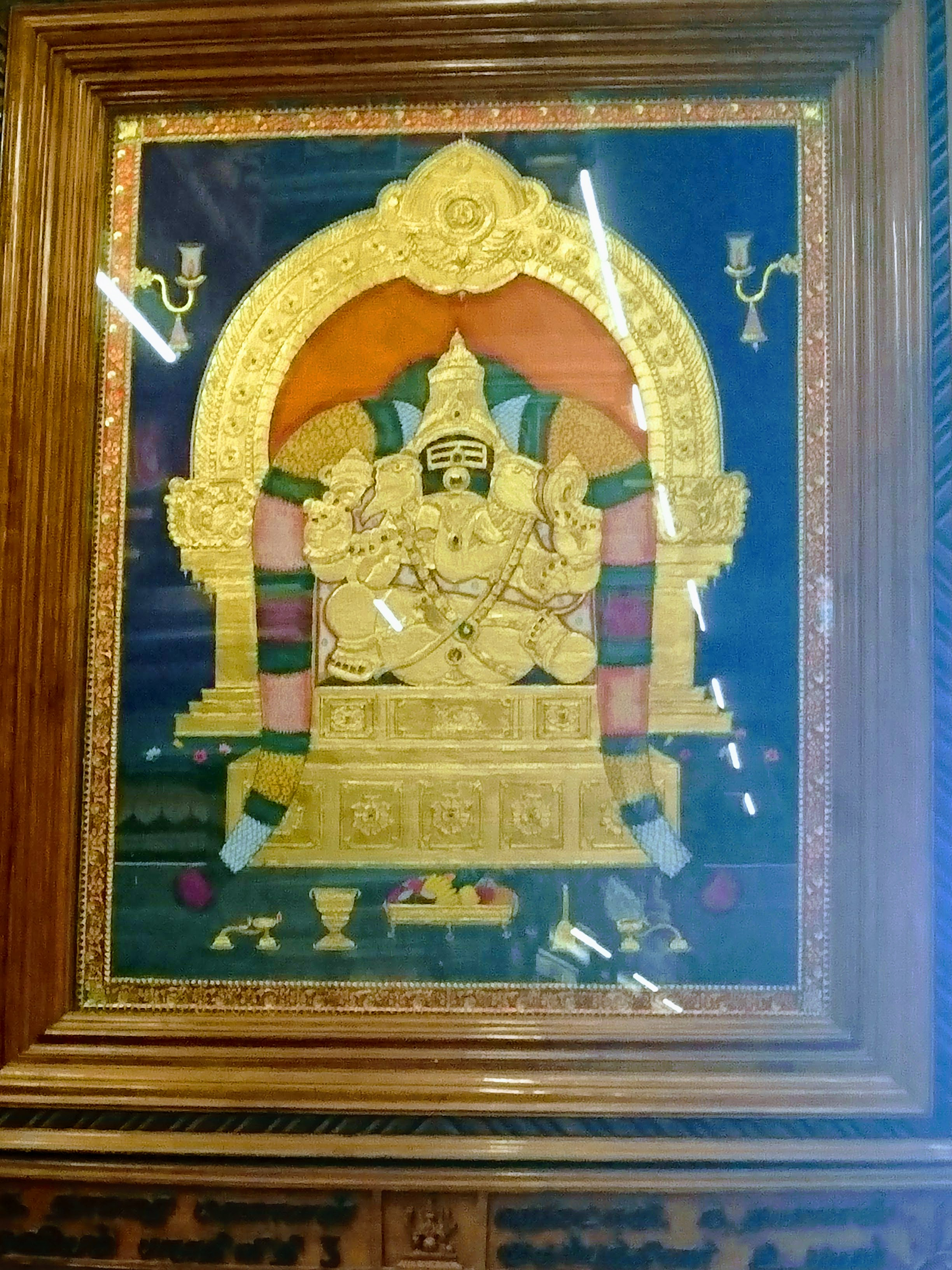
Tanjore Painting of Manakula Vinayagar

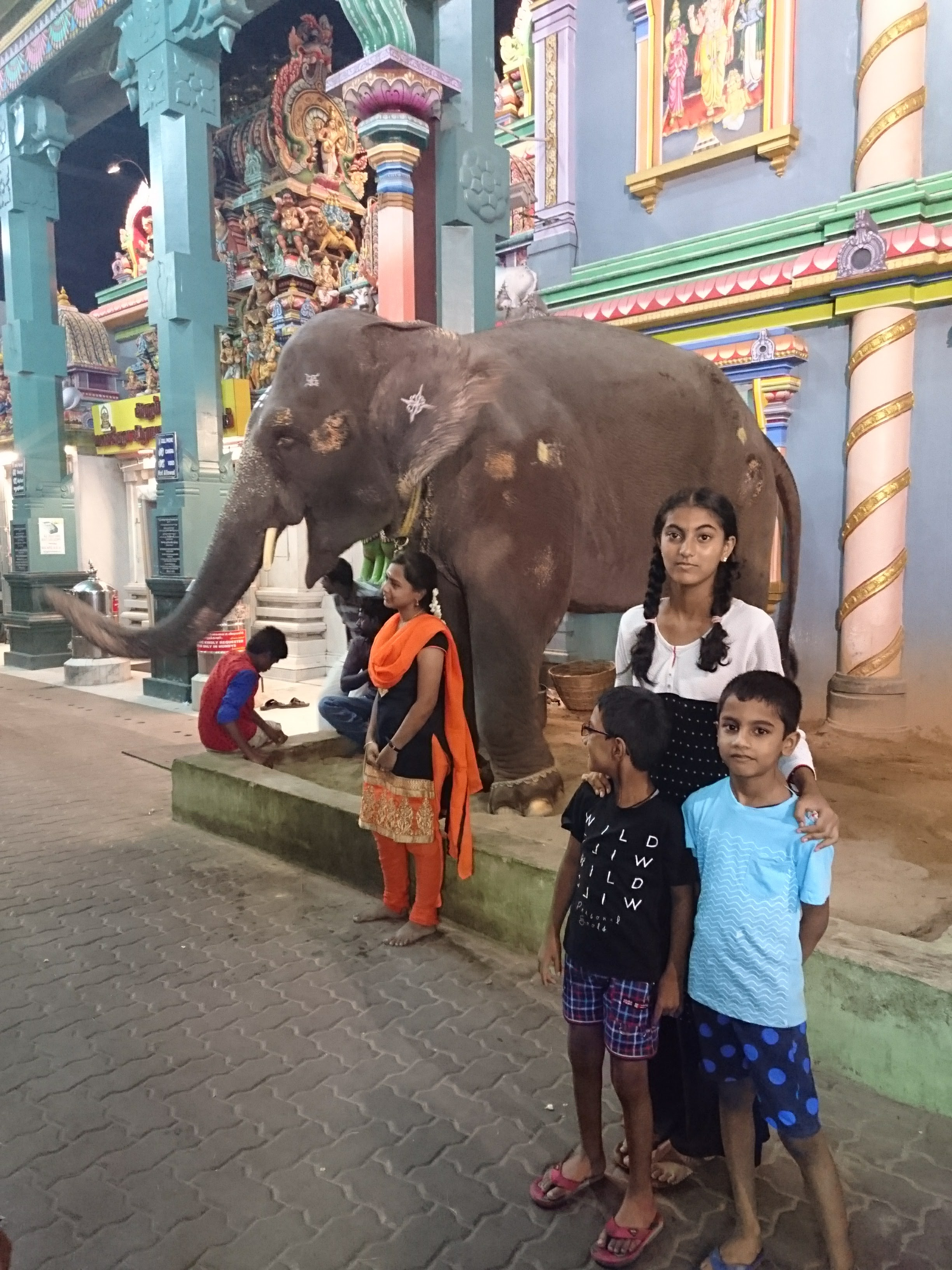
Devotees with Elephant Lakshmi

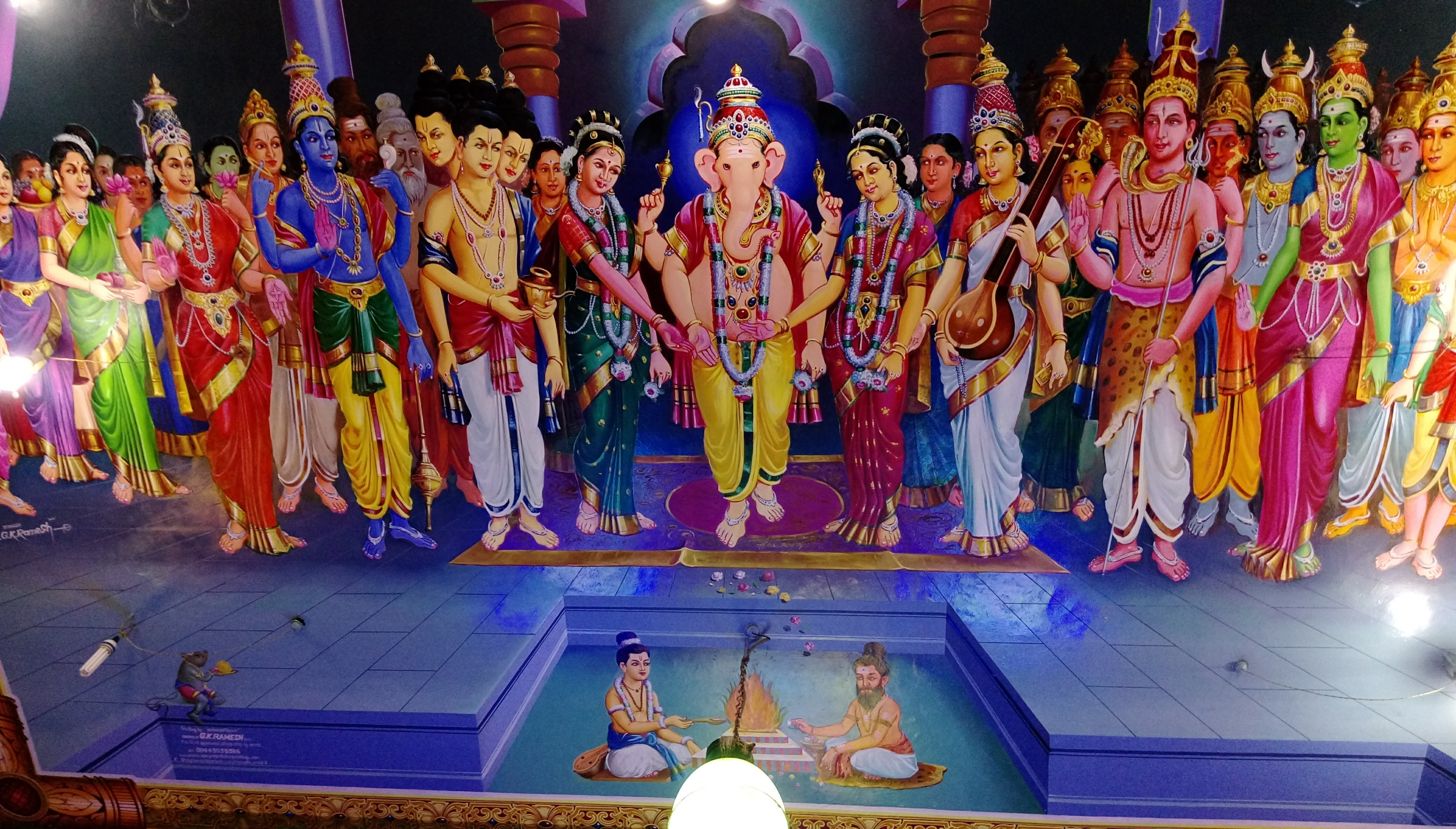
Temple Roof Top Painting

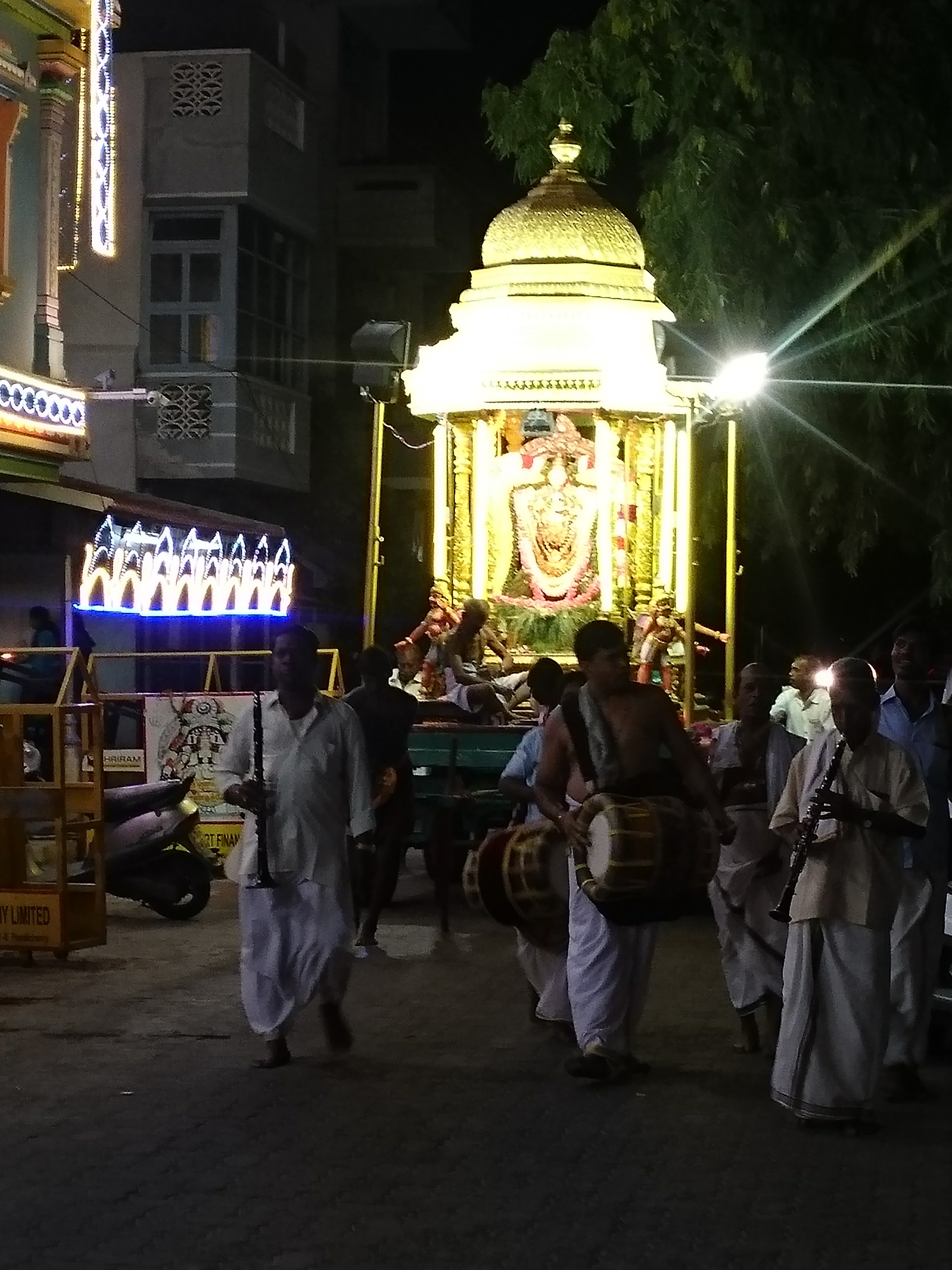
Temple Festival of Manakula Vinayagar of Pondicherry
