= Kancheepuram Adhi Kamatchiamman Temple =

Coordinates: 12°50′31″N 79°42′08″E

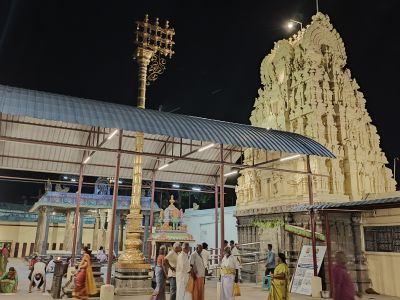
Adhi Kamatchiamman Temple

Kamcheepuram Adhi Kamatchiamman Temple is an amman shrine located at Kanchipuram in Tamil Nadu, India. This temple is also called as Adhipeeta Parameswari Kalikambal Temple. This is located at the rear side of the Kamakshi Amman Temple.

== Primary deity ==
The primary deity Adhi Kamatchiamman is in padmasana sitting posture, facing south. The once existed primary deity of the temple is found in a separate shrine with the name Veeriyalakshmi.

== Specialities ==
In this temple the deity is found in the combination of sakthi and gnana. On her hands udukkai, a musical instrument, trishul and skull are found.

== Festivals ==
Navaratri is celebrated here, for 13 days, in a grand manner.
