= Thanjavur Bangaru Kamatchiamman Temple =

Hindu temple in Thanjavur City, India

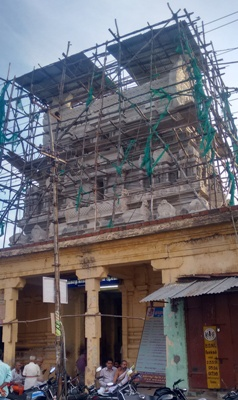
Rajagopura

Sri Bangaru Kamakshi Amman Temple is a Hindu Temple in Thanjavur City, Tamil Nadu. It is located at the West Main Street, Thanjavur.

== Structure ==
The temple has rajagopura, front mandapa, sanctum sanctorum and vimana.

== Presiding deity ==
The presiding deity is known as Bangaru Kamakshi Amman. On either side of the sanctum, sanctorum gatekeepers are found. At the left side of the sanctum sanctorum, the shrine of Kamakodi Amman is found.

At the entrance of the temple, there is a big Lord Ganesha called as 'Varada Maha Ganapati'.

== History ==
The temple was built around 1760s during the period of Maratha ruler Pratap Singh Bhonsle of Thanjavur.

== Shyama Sastri ==
Shyama Sastri, one of Trinity of Carnatic music, was born in the family which served as the temple priests in Bangaru Kamakshi Amman Temple.

== Kumbhabhishekham ( Consecration Ceremony ) ==
Past Consecration Ceremonies were conducted in the below mentioned dates.

18 March 1992, 3 March 2004, 23 March 2017.
