= Kottai Mariamman Temple, Dindigul =

Coordinates: 10.3605°N 77.9676°E

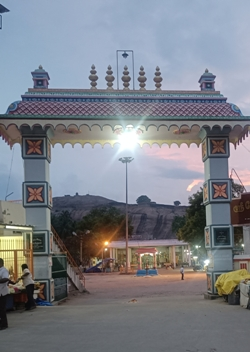
Temple entrance

Kottai Mariamman Temple is an Amman temple located at Dindigul, Dindigul district, Tamil Nadu, India.

== Presiding deity ==
Mariamman is the presiding deity of the temple. Along with the shrine of presiding deity, shrines of Vinayaka, Madurai Veeran, Navagraha, and Karuppanna Swami are found. This temple is mostly visited by th people of the area. It has so many important features.

== Entrances ==
This temple has three entrances. During the period of festivals, the deity would come through the front entrance. The rear side entrances are found along with the fort.

== Festival ==
During the Tamil month of Masi, 20-day festival is held in this temple.
