= Pulikkundram =

- village
- Country: India
- State: Tamil Nadu
- District: Chengalpattu

Population
  - Total: 646

Languages
  - Official: Tamil
- Time zone: UTC+5:30 (IST)
- PIN: 600109
- Telephone code: +9144
- Sex ratio: 1.06 ♂/♀

Pulikundram is a village located 2.9 kilometres (1.8 mi) from Thirukazhukundram, an ancient town in Chengalpattu district of the South Indian state of Tamil Nadu. It is known for its Sri Lakshmi Narayana temple. The Lakshmi Narayan temple was built between 1509 and 1529 during the reign of Krishnadevaraya Wodeyar of the Vijayanagara Empire.

== Geography ==
Pulikkundram location Coordinates: 13°20'47"N 79°49'29"E

== See also ==
- List of Hindu temples in India
