= Adikesava Perumal Temple, Paramandur =

Hindu temple in Tamil Nadu, India

Coordinates: 10.10412°N 79.01826°E

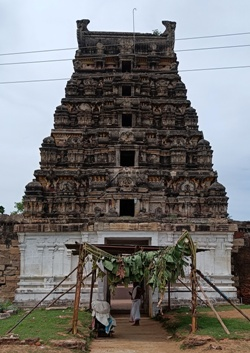
Rajagopura

Adikesava Perumal Temple is a Hindu temple located at Paramandur in Pudukkottai district, Tamil Nadu, India.

== Presiding deity ==
The presiding deity is known as Adikesava Perumal. He is flanked by Boodevi and Sridevi. Just in front of the sanctum sanctorum Jayan and Vijayan are found on either side.

== Structure ==
After rajagopura, bali peeta and Dhwaja Stambha are found. In the front mandapa Garudalvar, Vishvagnesar, Ramanuja, Manavala Munivar, Nammalvar, Varadaraja Perumal and Lakshmi Narasimha Perumal and sorga vasal (gateway to heaven) are found. In the prakara shrines of Parimalavalli Thayar and Parachara Maharishi are found. Temple tank is found in front of the temple.

== Sorga vasal ==
The opening ceremony of the sorga vasal is organized in a grand manner in this temple. Special pujas were done on the last Saturday of the Tamil month of Puattasi.
