= Abhimana Kshethram =

Group of Vaishnavite temples in India

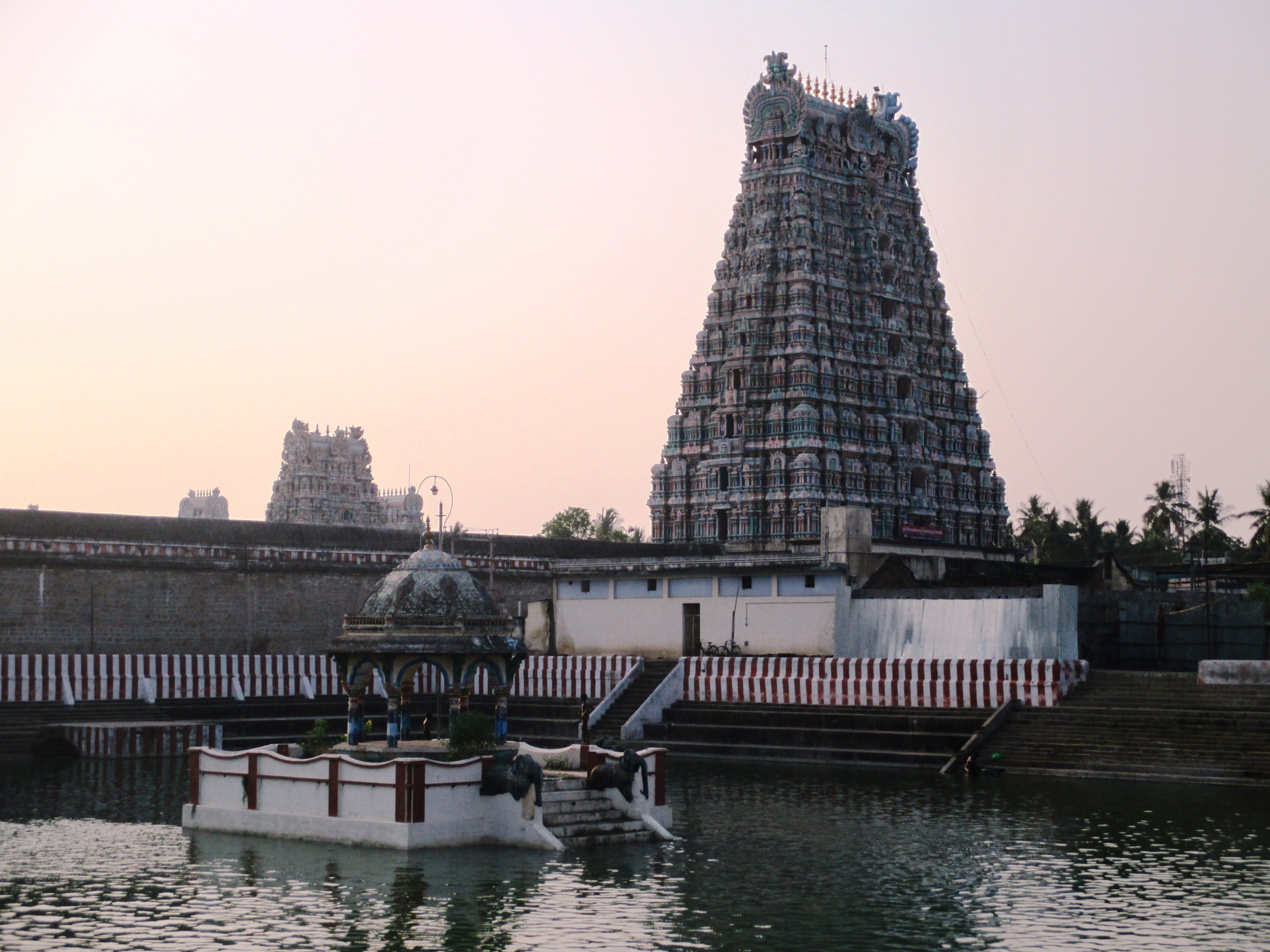
Sri Vidhya Rajagopalaswamy temple located in Mannargudi, is the first among the other Abhimana Kshethrams.

Abhimana Kshethram or Abhimana Sthalam are a list of 108 sacred Vishnu and Lakshmi temples apart from the other 108 Divya desams. Abhimana desams or close abodes, these temples are the most significant temples in the Sri Vaishnavite tradition which has similar greatness as Divya Desams. These set of temples is classified as an Abhimana Kshethram as it is mentioned in various Puranas and Ithihasas such as Ramayana and Mahabharata and have significant Sthala Puranas based on the Ithihasas and various Puranas of Hinduism. The temples are also said to be visited by many Religious scholars and saints such as Ramanuja, Adi Shankara, Madhvacharya, Nathamuni, Yamunacharya, Vedanta Desika, Manavala Mamunigal, Purandara Dasa, Narayana Teertha, Chaitanya Mahaprabhu and by many other great Vedic teachers and Rishis. Some of these Temples are said to be visited by the Alvars who did not sing the god's grace due to various reasons. Out of these 108 temples Rajagopalaswamy Temple, Mannargudi is considered as the 1st out of the 108 Abhimana Kshethras as Thirumangai Alvar is believed to have visited the temple and is believed to have built the tall flag post outside the temple with the help of cotton bales. The other Alvars who are believed to have visited the temple at various periods were seemingly lost in under the beauty of the presiding deity and were at a loss for words.

== Legend ==
There were many old and highly important temples which were not sung by the Alvars in their Naalayira Divya Prabandham hence, not classified as a Divya desam which made many Vaishnava scholars sad. Nathamuni, Madhvacharya, Ramanuja, Vedanta Desika and many other Vaishnavate scholars classified another sect of temples called Abhimana Kshethras. These temples are so close to the heart of Maha Vishnu hence, called Abhimana desam. These temples are classified as 108 Temples as various Vaishnavite Acharayas, Alvars and Various Rishis of puranas and ithihas glorify them.

== List of Abhimana Kshethrams ==
This is the list of the 108 sacred Temples dedicated to various forms of Vishnu the supreme deity of Vaishnavism. These 108 Abhimana Kshethras are present only in India.

No.	Name	Deity	Image	Location
1	Rajagopalaswamy Temple, Mannargudi	Sri Vidhya Rajagopalaswamy (Krishna) and Sri Sengamala Thayar		Mannargudi, Thiruvarur District, Tamil Nadu
2	Kothandaramar temple, Vaduvur	Kothandaramar and Sita		Vaduvur, Thiruvarur District, Tamil Nadu
3	Kothandaramar temple, Paruthiyur	Rama and Sita		
4	Srinivasa Perumal Temple, Kudavasal	Srinivasa Perumal with Sridevi, Bhudevi		Kudavasal, Thiruvarur District, Tamil Nadu
5	Kalinga narthana krishna Temple	Veda Naarayanar with Sridevi and Bhudevi		Paruthiyur, Tiruvarur district, Tamil Nadu
6	Chakrapani Temple, Kumbakonam	Chakrapani Perumal and Vijayalakshmi Thayar		Kumbakonam, Thanjavur District, Tamil Nadu
7	Kothandaramar Temple, Adambar	Rama with Sita		Adambar, Tiruvarur district, Tamil Nadu
8	Kothandaramar Temple, Thillaivilagam	Rama with Sita		Thillaivilagam, Tiruvarur district, Tamil Nadu
9	Sri Lakshmi Narayana Perumal, Varagur	Lakshmi Narayana Perumal, Venkatesha Perumal and Navaneetha Krishnan		
10	Mudikondan Kothandaramar Temple	Rama with Sita		Mudikondan, Tiruvarur district, Tamil Nadu
11	Kothandaramaswamy Temple, Patteeswaram	Rama with Sita		Patteeswaram, Thanjavur District, Tamil Nadu
12	Sri Ranganathaswamy Temple, Thirumandangudi	Ranganthaswamy and Ranganayaki Thayar.(Thondaradippodi Alvar avathara sthalam)		Thirumandangudi, Thanjavur District, Tamil Nadu
13	Ramaswamy Temple, Kumbakonam	Rama with Sita		Kumbakonam, Thanjavur District, Tamil Nadu
14	Rajagopalaswamy Temple, Kumbakonam	Rajagopalaswamy with Sridevi and Bhudevi		Kumbakonam, Thanjavur District, Tamil Nadu
15	Varahaperumal Temple, Kumbakonam	Varaha with Bhudevi		Kumbakonam, Thanjavur District, Tamil Nadu
16	Vasudeva Perumal Temple	Vasudeva perumal with Sridevi and Bhudevi		
17	Veetrirundha Perumal Temple	Veetrindha Perumal with Bhudevi and Niladevi		
18	Amrithanarayana Perumal Temple	Amritanarayana Perumal and Amrithavalli Thayar		Thirukkadaiyur,Mayiladuthurai, Tamil Nadu
19	Anandha narayana perumal temple, Abaranadari, Nagapattinam	Anandha narayana perumal and Alankaravalli Thayar		
20	Devanarayana Perumal temple, Thevur, Nagapattinam	Deva Narayana Perumal with Sridevi and Bhudevi		
21	Varadha Narayana Perumal Temple, Vadakalathur, Nagapattinam	Varadha Narayana Perumal and Perundevi Thayar		
22	Yadhava Perumal Temple, Kizhvelur, Nangapattinam	Yadhava Perumal with Sridevi and Bhudevi		
23	Sri Veeranarayana Perumal	Veeranarayana Perumal and Maragadhavalli Thayar		Kattumannarkoil, Cuddalore district, Tamil Nadu.
24	Sri Renganatha Perumal Temple, Vadarengam	Ranganatha Perumal and Ranganayaki Thayar		
25	Bhu Varaha Swamy temple	Varaha and Ambujavalli Thayar		Srimushnam, Cuddalore district, Tamil Nadu.
26	Adhirangam Ranganathaswamy temple	Adi Ranganatha Perumal and Ranganayaki Thayar		Sankarapuram, Tamil Nadu, India
27	Sri Lakshmi Narasimhswamy Temple, Polur	Narasimha and Kanagavalli Thayar		Polur, Tamil Nadu, India
28	Sri Yoga Rama temple	Yoga Rama and Shengamalavalli Thayar		Nedumgunam, Chettupattu, Tamil Nadu
29	Eri-Katha Ramar Temple	Erikatha Rama and Janakavalli Thayar (Sita)		Maduranthakam, Tamil Nadu, India
30	Sundaravarada Perumal temple	Sundaravarada Perumal and Anandavalli Thayar		Uthiramerur, Tamil Nadu
31	Padalathri Narasimhar Temple	Padalathri Narasimhar and Ahobilavalli Thayar		Singaperumal Koil, Chennai City
32	Adikesava Perumal temple, Mylapore	Adi Keshava perumal and Mayuravalli Thayar		
33	Madhava Perumal temple, Mylapore	Madhava Perumal and Amrithavalli Thayar		
34	Jagannatha Perumal temple	Jaganatha Perumal and Thirumangaivalli Thayar		
35	Adikesava Perumal temple, Sriperumpudur	Adi Keshava Perumal and Yathirajavalli Thayar		
36	Prasanna Venkatesa Perumal Temple, Thiruparkadal	Venkateshwara and Padmavathy		
37	Varadaraja Perumal Temple, Shoolagiri	Varadaraja Perumal and Perundevi Thayar		
38	Betrayaswamy Perumal temple, Denkanikottai	Betrayaswamy Perumal and Soundaryavalli Thayar		
39	Adi Srinivasa perumal temple, Mookanur, Dharmapuri	Adi moola Srinivasa Perumal and Padmavathy Thayar		
40	Kodandaramaswamy Temple, Ayothyapatinam, Salem	Rama with Sita		
41	Sundararaja Perumal Temple, Salem	Sundararaja Perumal and Sundaravalli Thayar		
42	Narasimhaswamy Temple, Namakkal	Narasimha and Namagiri Thayar		
43	Sri Kalyana Venkataramanaswamy, Thanthonimalai	Swayambu Sri Kalyana Venkataramanaswamy and Lakshmi in Vakshasthalam		
44	Vedanarayana perumal temple, Thirunarayanapuram	Vedanarayana Perumal and Vedanayaki Thayar		
45	Gunaseelam Prasanna Venkatachalapathy Temple	Prasanna Venkatachalapathy and Lakshmi in Vakshasthalam		
46	Kattu Narasimhaperumal Temple, Srirangam	Lakshmi Narasimha Perumal And Lakshmi on his lap.		Srirangam, Trichy district,Tamil Nadu
47	Kaliyuga Varadaraja Perumal Temple, Ariyalur	Varadaraja Perumal and Lakshmi in The Vakshasthala		
48	Sri Venkatesa Perumal Temple (Melathiruppathi) – Mondipalayam	Shaligrama Srinivasa Perumal		
49	Soundararajaperumal temple, Thadikombu	Soundararajaperumal and Soundaravalli		
50	Ranganathaswamy temple, Karamadai	Ranganatha Perumal and Ranganayaki Thayar		
51	Guruvayur Temple	Guruvayoorapan and Lakshmi in Vakshasthalam		
52	Janardanaswamy Temple, Varkala	Janardanaswamy Perumal		
53	Panniyur Sri Varahamurthy Temple	Varaha with Bhudevi		
54	Ananthapura Lake Temple, Kasaragod	Ananthapadmanabhaswamy Perumal		
55	Thirunelli, Maha Vishnu Temple	Maha Vishnu		
56	Thirupalkadal Sreekrishnaswamy Temple	Krishna as Thirupalkadal Bhattarakar with Bhoodevi and Mahalakshmi		
57	Thriprayar Rama Temple	Rama		
58	Koodalmanikyam Temple	Bharata		
59	Payammal Shatrughna Temple	Shatrughna		
60	Sri Krishna Trichambaram Temple	Raudra Krishna		
61	Kanipura Sri Gopalakrishna Temple	Gopalakrishna (Krishna)		
62	Maramkulangara Krishna Temple	Krishna		
63	Sree Vasudevapuram Mahavishnu Temple	Maha Vishnu and Ashta Lakshmi		
64	Sree Poornathrayeesa Temple	Adi Narayana as Santhana gopala murthi		
65	Ambalappuzha Sree Krishna Swamy Temple	Krishna		
66	Chottanikkara Temple	Lakshmi Narayana		
67	Andalurkavu Sri Ramachandramoorthi Temple	Rama		
68	Sree Krishna Swami Temple, Thodupuzha	Krishna		
69	Evoor Major Sri Krishnaswamy Temple	Krishna		
70	Thiruvallam Sree Parasurama Temple	Parashurama		
71	Vilwadrinatha Temple	Rama		
72	Trikkulasekharapuram Sri Krishna Temple	Krishna		
73	Ramapuram Sree Rama Temple	Rama with Sita		
74	Varadaraja Perumal, Thiruvenkatanathapuram	Varadaraja Perumal With Sri Devi and Bhoo Devi		
75	Thanumalayan Temple	Brahma Vishnu and Shiva		
76	Padhmanabhaswamy Perumal temple, Nellaiappar Temple	Anathapadhmanabhaswamy and Gajalakshmi Thayar		
77	Sri Varadharaja Perumal Kovil	Varadaraja Perumal and Mahalakshmi Thayar		
78	Rajagopalaswamy Manarkoil	Rajagopalaswamy Perumal		
79	Kattalagar Perumal Temple	Kallazhagar Perumal		
80	Kothandaramaswamy Temple, Rameshwaram	Rama and Seetha Pirati (Sita)		
81	Ranganathaswamy Temple, Srirangapatna	Ranganathaswamy and Ranganayaki Devi		
82	Ranganathaswamy Temple, Shivanasamudra	Ranganathaswamy and Ranganayaki		
83	Cheluvanarayana Swamy Temple	Cheluvanarayana Swamy		
84	Gunja Narasimha Swamy Temple, Tirumakudal Narasipura	Narasimha and Lakshmi Devi		
85	Udupi Sri Krishna Matha	Krishna		
86	Kalady Krishna Temple	Sree Krishnaswamy		
87	Narasimha Jharni	Sri Lakshmi Nararasimhswamy		
88	Kurmanathaswamy temple, Srikurmam	Kurmanathaswamy and Kurmanayaki Devi		
89	Yogananda Lakshmi Narasimha Swamy Temple, Mattapalli	Sri Yogananda Lakshmi Narasimha with Rajalakshmi Thayar and Chenchu Lakshmi Thayar		
90	Varaha Lakshmi Narasimha temple, Simhachalam	Varaha Narasimha and Simhavalli thayar		
91	Sita Ramachandraswamy Temple, Bhadrachalam	Rama with Sita		
92	Lakshmi Narasimha Temple, Mangalagiri	Lakshmi Narasimha		
93	Kodandarama Temple, Tirupati	Rama with Sita		
94	Jagannath Temple, Puri	Jaganatha and Jaganmata		
95	Chakra Narasimha Temple	Chakra Narasimha		
96	Vithoba Temple	Vithoba and Rakhumai		
97	Alarnatha Mandira	Maha Vishnu as Jaganatha (Azhwarnathar) and Mahalakshmi		
98	Jyotisar	Krishna		
99	Narayan Sarovar	Maha Vishnu		
100	Sakhigopal Temple	Gopinatha		
101	Khirachora Gopinatha Temple	Gopinatha		Remuna, Odisha, India
102	Charbhuja Nath Temple	Charbhuja Nath		Kumbhalgarh,Rajsamand district, Rajasthan
103	Vishnuprayag	Maha Vishnu as Theertham		confluence of India's Alaknanda and Dhauliganga
104	Vishnupad Temple, Gaya	Maha Vishnu		Gaya, Bihar, India
105	Tri Yugi Narayanaswamy Temple	Narayana and Lakshmi		Triyuginarayan village in Rudraprayag district, Uttarakhand
106	Narasimha temple, Jyothir Math	Narasimha	cemtre	Joshimath, Chamoli district, Uttarakhand
107	Adi Keshava Temple, Kashi	Adi Keshava		Kashi
108	Yoga-Narasimha Swamy Temple	Saligrama Yoga Narasimha		Melukote ,Mandya district, Karnataka
