= Varadharajaperumal temple =

Varadharaja Perumal Temple may refer to:

- Varadharaja Perumal Temple, Kanchipuram, a temple in Kanchipuram, Kanchipuram district, Tamil Nadu, India
- Varadharaja Perumal Temple, Puducherry, a temple in Puducherry, Tamil Nadu, India
- Varadharajaperumal temple, Thirubuvanai, a temple in Thirubuvanai, Puducherry, Tamil Nadu, India
- Varadharaja Perumal temple, Thiruvottiyur, a temple in Thiruvottiyur, Thiruvallur district Tamil Nadu, India
- Varadaraja Perumal Temple, Poonamallee, a temple in Poonamallee, Thiruvallur district, Tamil Nadu, India
- Varadaraja Perumal Temple, Shoolagiri, a temple in Shoolagiri, Krishnagiri district, Tamil Nadu, India
- Sri Varadharaja Perumal Kovil, a temple in Tirunelveli, Tamil Nadu, India
- Kalyana Varadharaja Perumal Temple, a temple in Sengalipuram, Tiruvarur district, Tamil Nadu, India
- Pasupathikoil Varadharaja Perumal Temple, a Perumal temple in Thanjavur district, Tamil Nadu, India
- Nallur Sundara Varadharaja Perumal Temple, a Perumal temple in Tiruvannamalai district
- Kaliyuga Varadaraja Perumal Temple, a Perumal temple in Ariyalur district

== See also ==
- Varadaraja (disambiguation)
