= Adikesava Perumal temple, Mylapore =

Hindu temple in Chennai, India

Adi Kesava temple
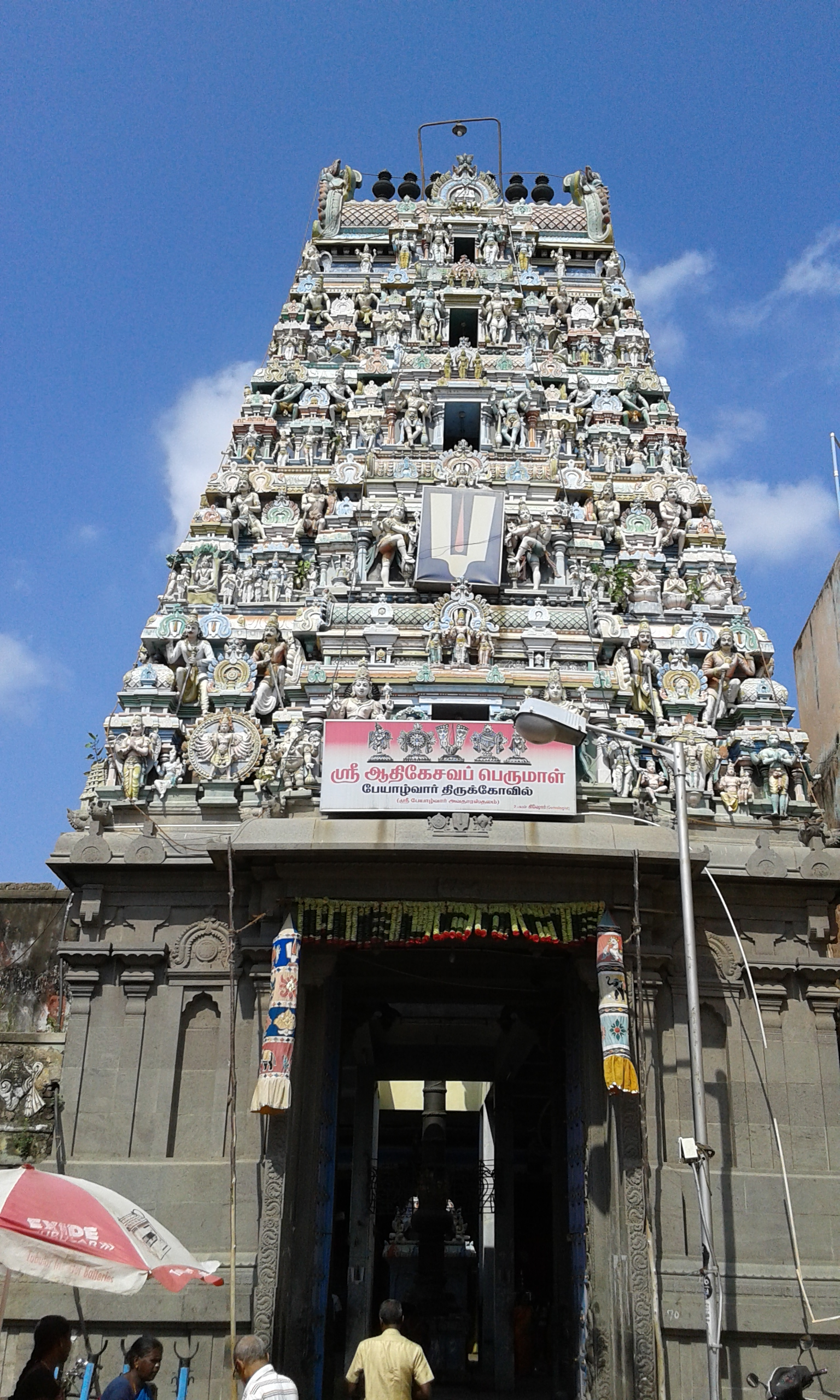

- Location in Tamil Nadu

Religion
- Affiliation: Hinduism
- District: Chennai
- Deity: Adi Kesava Perumal (Vishnu); Mayuravalli Thayar (Lakshmi)

Location
- Location: Mylapore
- State: Tamil Nadu
- Country: India
- Coordinates: 13°1′50″N 80°16′14″E

Architecture
- Type: Tamil architecture

Adi Kesava Temple is dedicated to Hindu god Vishnu located in Mylapore, Chennai, in the South Indian state of Tamil Nadu. Constructed in the Tamil style of architecture, dedicated to Vishnu, who is worshipped as Adi Kesava Perumal and his consort Lakshmi as Mayuravalli Thayar. The temple is believed to be the birthplace of Peyalvar, an Alvar saint. It is considered one among the 108 Abhimana Kshethram of Vaishnavate tradition.

Chithra Kulam, the temple tank is believed to be of historic origin and one of the major rainwater storage facility in the region. The float festival celebrated during the Tamil month of Thai is a very prominent festival of the temple. The temple is open from 5 a.m. to 11 a.m. and 5 p.m. to 8 p.m and has six daily rituals at various times of the day. The temple is maintained and administered by the Hindu Religious and Endowment Board of the Government of Tamil Nadu.

== Legend ==
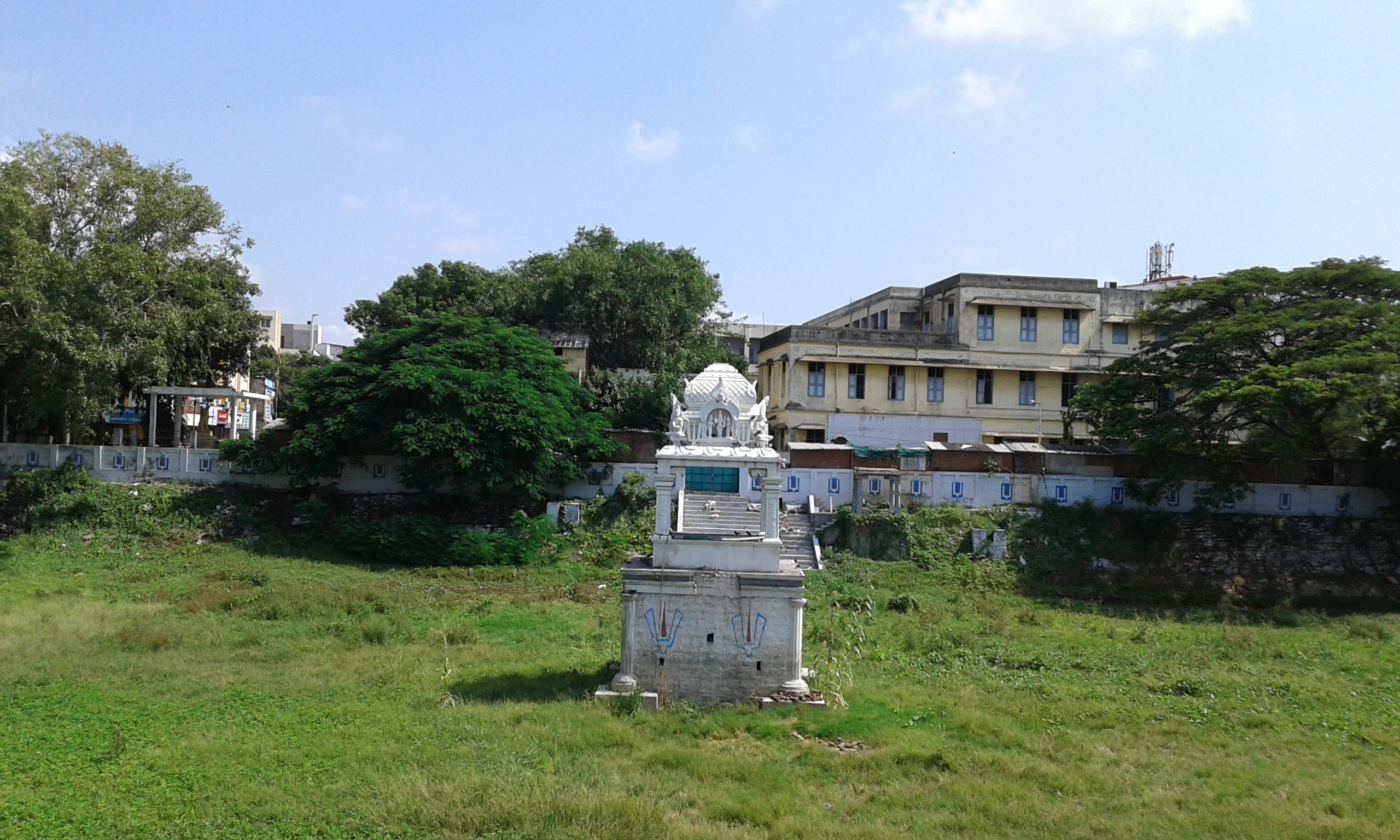
Chittirai Kulam - the temple tank

As per Hindu legend, during the churning of the Ocean of milk, Vishnu instructed his consort Lakshmi to reach the hermitage of Sage Bhrigu. The sage was doing a penance to attain a girl child, and accepted Lakshmi as his daughter. The presiding deity, Adi Kesava, is believed to have married goddess Bhargavi, the daughter of sage Bhrigu.

The temple is believed to be the birthplace of Peyalvar, one of the twelve Alvar saints of the 6th-9th century CE. The Alvar was found from the 60 ft (18 m) well called Manikairavam inside the temple premises.

== The temple ==
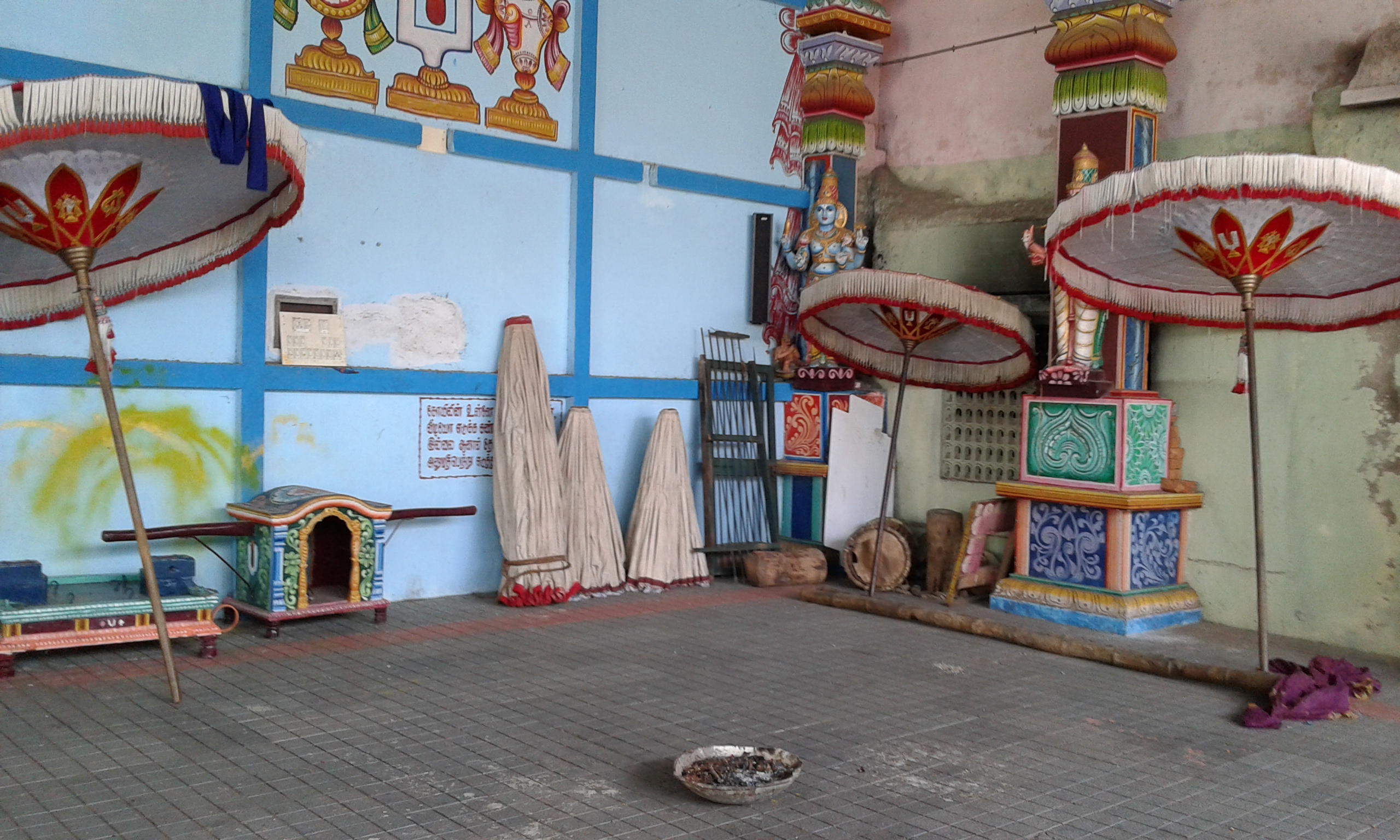
Festival hall

The temple is built in Tamil architecture occupies around 1.5 acres (0.61 ha) and has two precincts. It is located in Mylapore, in Chennai, the capital of the South Indian state of Tamil Nadu. The temple has a rectangular plan surrounded by 10 ft (3.0 m) high walls, with a 5-tier gopuram, the gateway tower. The presiding deity is housed in the sanctum and is an image made of granite. The deity is seen in standing posture. The shrine of Garuda faces Adi Kesava, the eagle mount (Vahana) of Vishnu. The central shrine is approached through a worship hall and a narrow Ardha Mandapam. The flagpost ("Dhwaja sthambam") is located behind the shrine of Garuda. There are images of Alvars in the worship hall on both sides and the shrine of Mayuravalli is located on the western side of the temple in the second precinct. In modern times, the temple is maintained and administered by the Hindu Religious and Charitable Endowments Department of the Government of Tamil Nadu.

In modern times, the temple tank as a store house for rain water harvesting for the nearby areas. The temple tank is believed to be 4,000 years old and was desilted for the first time in 2016. The float festival in the temple was celebrated from 2005 and 2016 and was not celebrated later due to dry tank due to clogging of the canals leading to the tank.

== Festivals ==
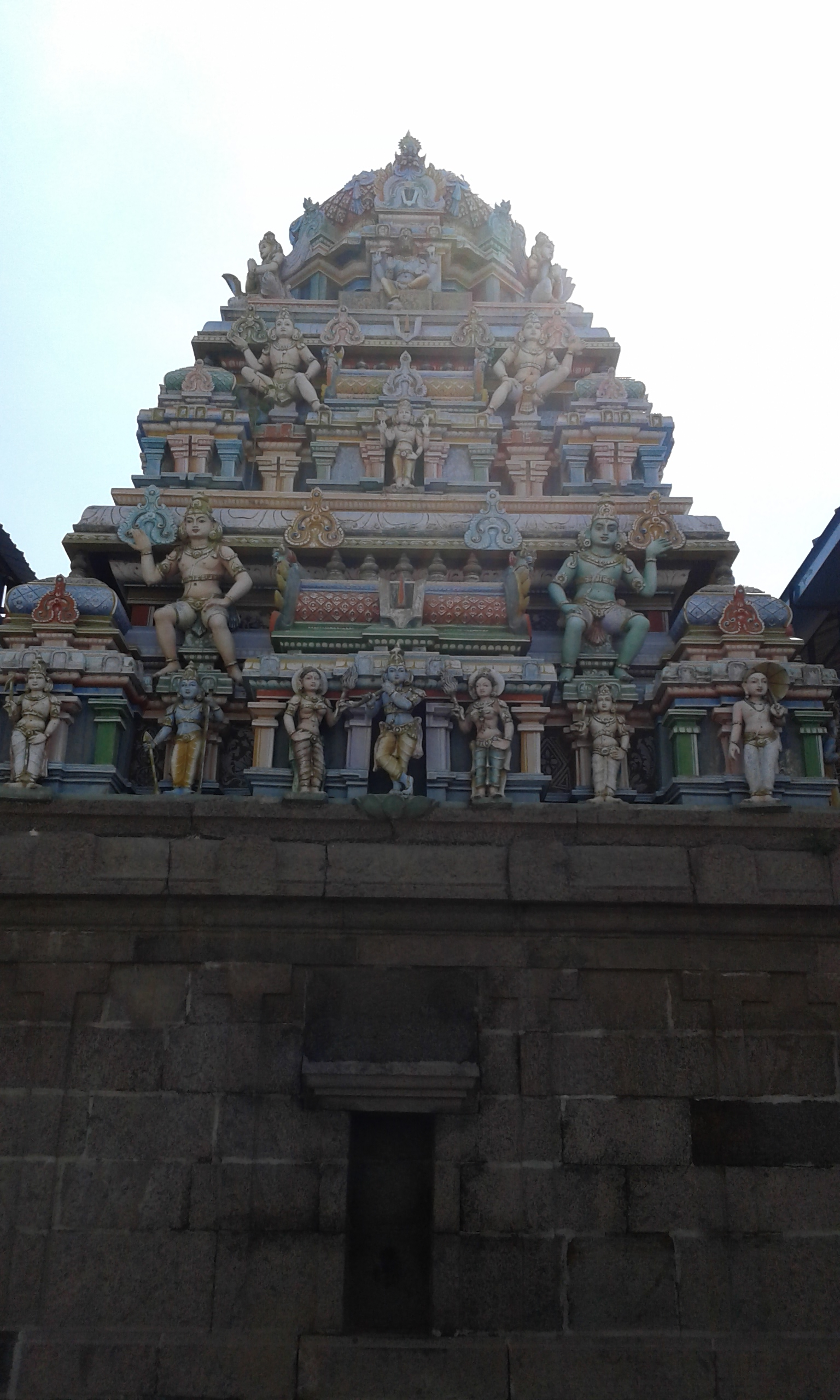
Vimanam of the central shrine

The temple procession takes place during the ekadasi day, Tiruvonam, the occasions of the full moon and the new moon, when the festival images (utsavar) of Adi Kesava, Sridevi, and Bhudevi are taken in a procession. There are different processions taken by Mayuravalli Thaayaar on Fridays and Uthiram star, Andal on the Pooram star, Rama on Punarpoosam, and the Alvars, on their birthdays. Brahmotsavam, the main festival of the temple is performed during the Tamil month of Panguni. During the ten-day festival, the twelve Alvars and the twenty-one Vaishnava Acharyas are taken in procession along with Adi Kesava perumaaL. During the Tamil month of Aadi, float festival (theppothsavam) is conducted for five days.

== Religious importance ==
The goddess Mayuravalli is worshipped with Bilva leaves, which are otherwise used only in Shiva temples. Shiva, Parvati, and Lakshmi in the form of Mayuravalli are believed to have worshipped Adi Kesava Perumal and got relieved off their curses. It is believed that Pey Alvar was taught by Mayuravalli. Following the legend of the temple, the temple is frequented by devotees praying for their education and also for getting a good married life. The temple and Kapaleeshwarar Temple are the oldest extant monuments in Mylapore.

== See also ==
- Madhava Perumal Temple, Mylapore
