= Veetrirundha Perumal Temple =

Hindu temple in Tamil Nadu, India

Religion
- Affiliation: Hinduism
- District: Thanjavur district
- Deity: Lord Vishnu

Location
- Location: Veppathur in the Thiruvidaimarudur taluk
- State: Tamil Nadu
- Country: India
- Interactive map of Veetrirundha Perumal Temple

The Veetrirundha Perumal Temple is a Hindu temple situated in the village of Veppathur in the Thiruvidaimarudur taluk of Thanjavur district, Tamil Nadu, India. The temple is glorified by Maharishi Valmiki and classified as one of the 108 Abhimana Kshethrams of the Vaishnavate tradition. This place is said to be worshiped by many Vaishnava Acharyas. The temple is very different from other temples and is one of the oldest surviving temples which date to the Pre-Pallava era.

== Legend ==
Legend has it that Lord Rama came to this place and sat down in a very depressed mood, Bhumi devi and Niladevi felt so sad and wanted to cool him down and starting offering solace with a palm fan. Thus, in this ancient temple, Veetrirundha Perumal offers darshan with the two consorts, Neela Devi and Booma Devi on either side. The name Veetrindha Perumal means "the seated lord". This is one of the most ancient temples of Tamil Nadu dating to pre-Pallava period.

== History ==
The east-facing temple consists of layer of bricks below the temple, which is dated around 400 CE (some even date this to 100 CE), showing a prominent temple later reconstructed by Nandivarman II, a Vishnu devotee who settled Brahmins in this place. He then named the place "Avani Chathurvedi Mangalam" and the temple as "Avani Narana Vinnagar." The stone and mortar temple is believed to have been constructed in about 850 CE by the Pallavas and was later renovated by the Chola king Raja Raja Chola and by Krishnadevaraya in 1520 CE. The temple is built on top of an older brick temple some of whose remains have survived. The remains constitute one of the two surviving Hindu temples of the pre-Pallava period, the other being the Murugan temple at Saluvankuppam, and one of the oldest ones in Tamil Nadu.
