= Betrayaswamy temple =

Hindu temple in Krishnagiri

Betrayaswamy Temple
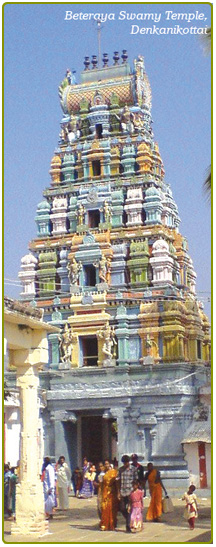

- Location in Tamil Nadu

Religion
- Affiliation: Hinduism
- District: Krishnagiri
- Deity: Betrayaswamy (Vishnu) Soundaryavalli (Lakshmi)

Location
- Location: Denkanikottai
- State: Tamil Nadu
- Country: India
- Coordinates: 12°30′58″N 77°47′55″E

Architecture
- Type: Hoysala architecture

Betrayaswamy temple (also called Denkanikottai Temple) in Denkanikottai town in Krishnagiri district in the South Indian state of Tamil Nadu, is dedicated to the Hindu god Vishnu. The temple is Classified one among the 108 Abhimana Kshethram of Vaishnavate tradition. It is located 30 km from Hosur and 60 km from Bangalore and 318 km from Chennai, 77 km from Dharmapuri. In this temple Constructed in the Hoysala style of architecture, the temple is dedicated to Vishnu who is worshipped as Devaperumal and his consort Lakshmi as Soundaryavalli in this temple.

As per Hindu legend, Venkateswara believed to have appeared for the sage Kanva to save him from the yaksha Devandagadagan. A granite wall surrounds the temple, enclosing all its shrines. The temple has a five tiered rajagopuram, the temple's gateway tower. The Wodeyars of Mysore commissioned pillared halls and major shrines of the temple during the 16th century.

The temple follows the Tenkalai tradition of worship. Two daily rituals and many yearly festivals are held at the temple, of which the fifteen-day annual Chittirai Kalyana Utsavam during the Tamil month of Chittirai (April - May) and nine-day Brahmotsavam being the most prominent. The temple is maintained and administered by the Hindu Religious and Endowment Board of the Government of Tamil Nadu.

== Legend ==
The place finds mention in Skanda Purana, which has eight chapters detailing the legend of the temple. As per Hindu legend, Devandagadagan, a yaksha and the relative of the famous king Kubera, once got a boon from Brahma that he would get endless powers. He was very proud of his powers and started troubling the devas, the celestial deities, and the sages who were doing penance in the region. He was once punished by sage Atri, who cursed him to roam in the forest and said that he would be relieved of his curse once Vishnu strikes him with a mace. Ages passed by and Kanvagada was troubling the sages in the forest. Once sage Kanva was finding it difficult to spot a place to do his penance, when sage Atri advised him to go to a place on the banks of Cauvery close to Narayanagiri. Kanva started doing his penance and the yaksha started troubling the sage. A divine voice informed the sage to seek the help of Venkateswara. The sage did so and Venkateswara came to the place from his abode at Tirumala Venkateswara Temple. He transformed as a hunter with a bow called Sharanga and his mace called Denkani. An intense battle followed between the hunter and Devandagadaga, eventually the hunter slaying the yaksha with Denkani. In memory of the event, the place came to be known as Denkanipuram, which eventually became Denkanikottai. The sage and the yaksha were blessed with the auspicious vision of Venkateswara, who made the place his abode.

== History ==
Ballaraya was a ruler of the Paligar family, who held sway over the region and the temple. The region came to the hands of Haisala Jagadevaraya, a feudatory of the Vijayanagara Empire. It is believed that the fortress in the region was built during his regime. In 1652, Itapel Rao, a Maratha feudatory annexed the region, which changed hands to Chandrasekara Rao in 1653. The Wodeyars of Mysore held sway over the region till 1768, when the British under Casby held control of the region. When there were threats from Muslim rulers in the region, the image of the presiding deity was hidden by a devotee named Venkatapahty Rayar in the forest. The Vaishya community in the region is believed to have contributed to the major halls and shrines of the temple.

== Architecture ==
Betrayaswamy temple is constructed in the Hoysala style of architecture. The temple occupies an area of 1 acre (0.40 ha) and is surrounded by a granite walls. The rectangular enclosure measure 244 ft (74 m) by 204 ft (62 m), while the temple tank measures 220 ft (67 m) by 235 ft (72 m). The five tiered rajagopuram, the temple's gateway tower, has five kalasam at the top. The sanctum houses the image of Betrayaswamy in standing posture similar to the image of Venkateswara in Tirumala Venkateswara Temple. The images of Sridevi and Bhudevi are located on either of his sides. The Ardha mandapa is guarded by two dvarapalas on either sides. The shrine of Soundaravalli is located closed to the eastern gateway. There Mahamandapa houses the images of sage Kanva, Vedanta Desikar, Manavala Mamunigal, the Alvars, and Ramanuja. There are separate shrines for Venugopala housing Satyabhama and Rukmini, and Rama housing Sita, Lakshmana, and Hanuman. There are a number of smaller shrines and halls in the precincts of the temple. There are three temple tanks associated with the temple namely Chakra Tirtha, Sundari Tirtha and Sanatkumara Tirtha.

== Festival ==
The temple is one of the prominent landmarks of Denkanikottai and one of the most visited tourist destinations in the region. The temple follows the traditions of the Tenkalai sect of the Vaishnavite tradition and follows the Pancharatra agama. The temple priests are from a hereditary family referred as Kittambi. They are believed to be from Thiruvellarai in Tiruchirapalli district. The temple rituals are performed two times a day: Kalasanthi at 8:00 a.m. and Aravanai Pooja at 6:00 p.m. Each ritual has three steps: alangaram (decoration), neivethanam (food offering) and deepa aradanai (waving of lamps) for both Betrayaswamy and Soundaryavalli. There are weekly, monthly and fortnightly rituals performed in the temple. Various festivals are celebrated in the temple, of which the fifteen-day annual Chittirai Kalyana Utsavam during the Tamil month of Chittirai (April - May) and nine-day Brahmotsavam being the most prominent. During the Brahmotsavam, the temple car is drawn around the streets of temple with the festival images housed in it. The temple car was damaged in a fire in 1906 and was restored in 1909. The idols of Vinayagar Chaturthi for visarga (immersion) in the region are immersed in the temple tank.
