= Varadaraja =

Varadaraja may refer to:

- Sri Varadaraja (Lord Varadaraja), a form of Vishnu
- Varadarāja, 17th-century Hindu Sanskrit grammarian
- Varadaraja, fictional character in the 2023 Indian film Salaar
- Varadharaja Perumal Temple (disambiguation), various temples in Tamil Nadu
