= Arulmigu Prasanna Venkatesa Perumal Temple =

Hindu temple in Ranipet district, Tamil Nadu, India

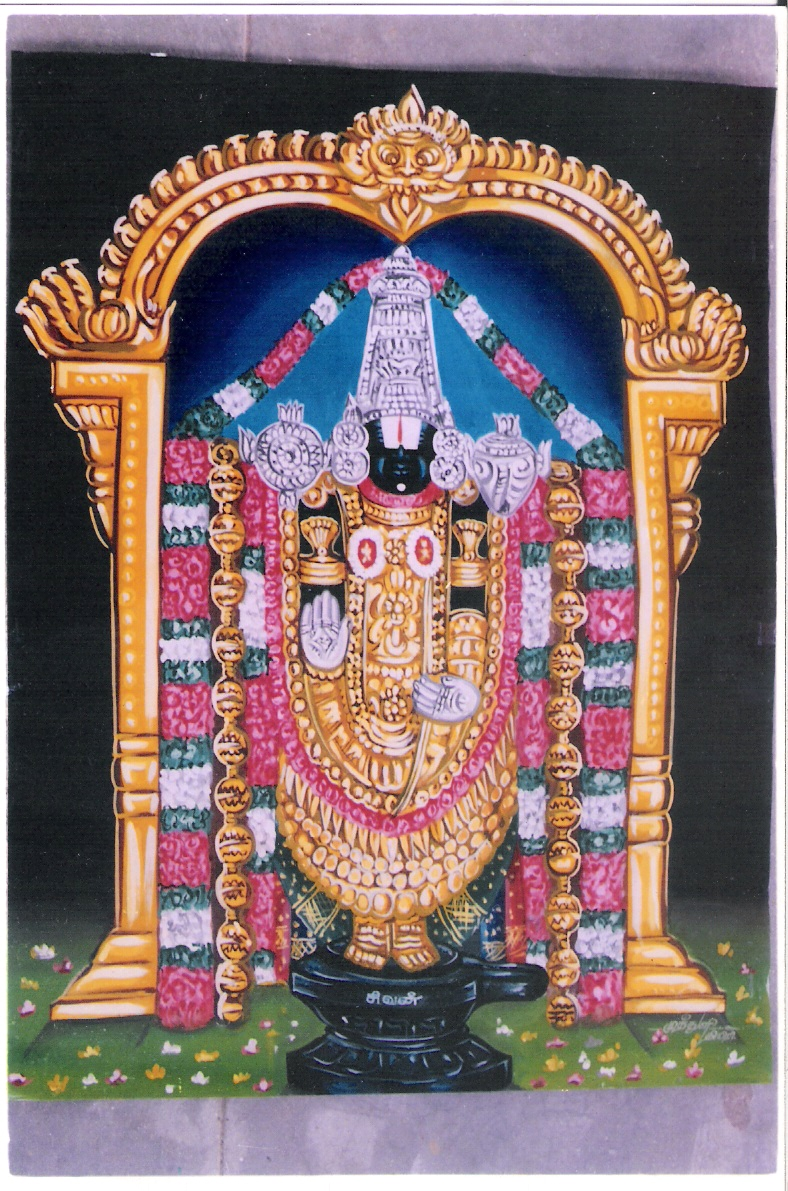
- Painting of the central deity of the temple, standing on a lingam

- Location in Tamil Nadu

Religion
- Affiliation: Hinduism
- District: Ranipet
- Deity: Venkateshvara (Vishnu)
- Festivals: Brahmotsavam, Vaikuntha Ekadasi

Location
- Location: Kaveripakkam
- State: Tamil Nadu
- Country: India
- Interactive map of Arulmigu Prasanna Venkatesa Perumal Temple
- Coordinates: 12°54′1″N 79°27′5″E

Architecture
- Type: Dravidian

The Arulmigu Prasanna Venkatesa Perumal Temple is a temple dedicated to Venkateshvara, a form of the Hindu deity Vishnu. It is located at the Indian village of Thirupparkadal at Ranipet district, Tamil Nadu. It is considered one among the 108 Abhimana Kshethram of Vaishnavate tradition.

== Location ==
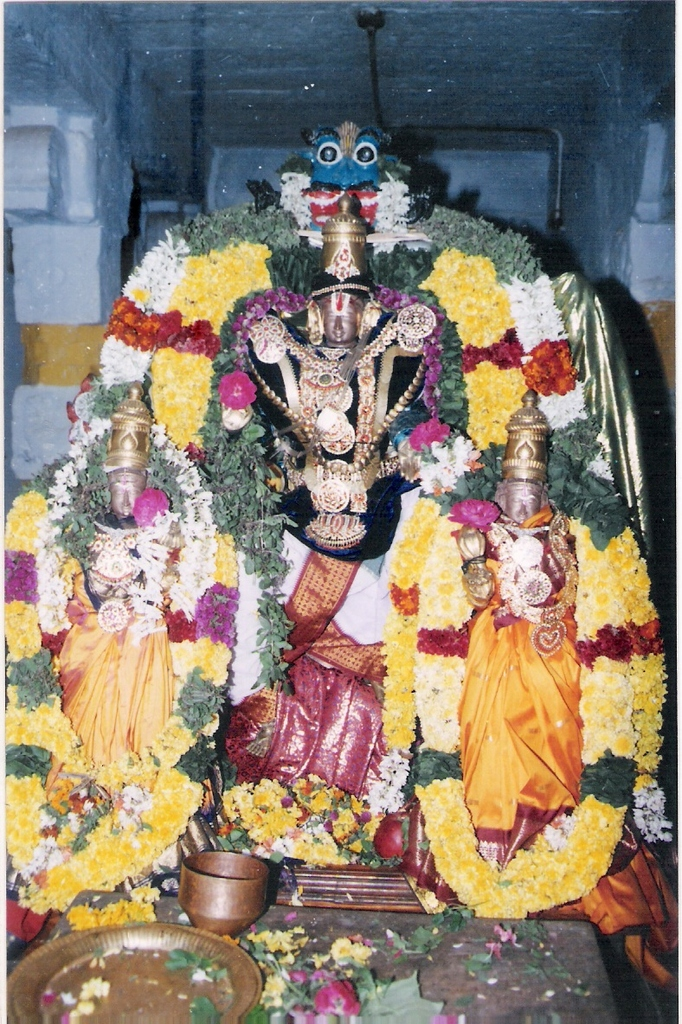
The central deity (utsavar) of the temple, flanked by Sridevi and Bhudevi

Thirupparkadal village, known as Karapuram in ancient times, is a scenic fertile area surrounded by greenish fields, and is the site of two Shiva temples, and two Vishnu temples. According to local tradition, this is one of the sites where Vishnu rested on his mount Adishesha to prevent the gushing Sarasvati river, also called Vegavati, from disrupting and destroying the yagna performed by Brahma, to seek the grace of the deity at Kanchipuram. Vishnu is regarded to lay on Adishesha at three places: Pallikonda (As Uthara Ranganathar) near Vellore, Thirupparkadal, and finally at Kanchipuram, where the temple is called Tiruvekka (As Yathothrakari).

== Religious significance ==
According to local tradition, a Vaishnava maharishi named Pundarika visited Thirupparkadal to have a darshana (auspicious vision) of the deity Ranganatha. Instead, he found a Shiva lingam within the sanctum sanctorum named Sri Doseshvarar instead of Vishnu. Upon seeing this, he was disappointed, and returned.

Vishnu wanted to fulfill the desire of the Vaishnava devotee, and transformed himself as an old Vaishnava. He enquired Pundarika regarding his sorrow. Pundarika shared his disappointment with the old Vaishnava. The old Vaishnava insisted that the deity in the sannidhi was indeed that of Vishnu, and accompanied the sage Pundarika to the temple, before disappearing. Pundarika walked right into the inner sanctum of the temple and saw Perumal in his abhayamudra, standing on top of the Shiva lingam. This was on the occasion of Ekadashi, and from that day, the presiding deity has been called Sri Prasanna Venkatesa Perumal. This temple is held in popular tradition to show Vaishnavas and Shaivas that Hari and Hara are one and the same. Every year, on Vaikuntha Ekadashi day, a number of devotees visit this temple. Another Vaishnava temple called as Sri Ranganathar temple is situated at the side of the Prasanna Venkatesa Perumal temple.

== Architecture and significance ==
The rajagopuram of Sri Prasanna Venkatesa Perumal temple is presently in dilapidated state. Adjacent to the structure is a kodimaram, a tank dedicated to Pundarika called Pundareega Pushkarani, and an altar, a small mandapam, and the maharishi gopuram. There is another mandapam in the entrance of the sanctum sanctorum, which has also shrines for Thumbikkai Alvar, Nammalvar, Madurakavi Alvar, Thirumangai Alvar, and Bhoothath Alvar.

Inside the inner sanctum, the presiding deity Venkatesa Perumal stands on Avudaiyar (Shiva lingam) with in an abhayamudra. There are carvings of Krishnadevarayar, Dhalavan Naicken, Rani Mangammal, Aranganayagam, and Aranganayaki, all portrayed in a praying pose.

The temple was once renovated by the Vijayanagara emperor Krishnadevarayar. It also houses shrines for Alamelumangai Thayar, Anjaneyar, Garudalvar, Desikar, Rukmini, Satyabhama, and Thirukkachi Nambi. Since this temple was patronised by Krishnadevarayar, there is an idol of his likeness within the sanctum.
