= Adhirangam Ranganathaswamy temple =

Ranganatha Perumal Kovil
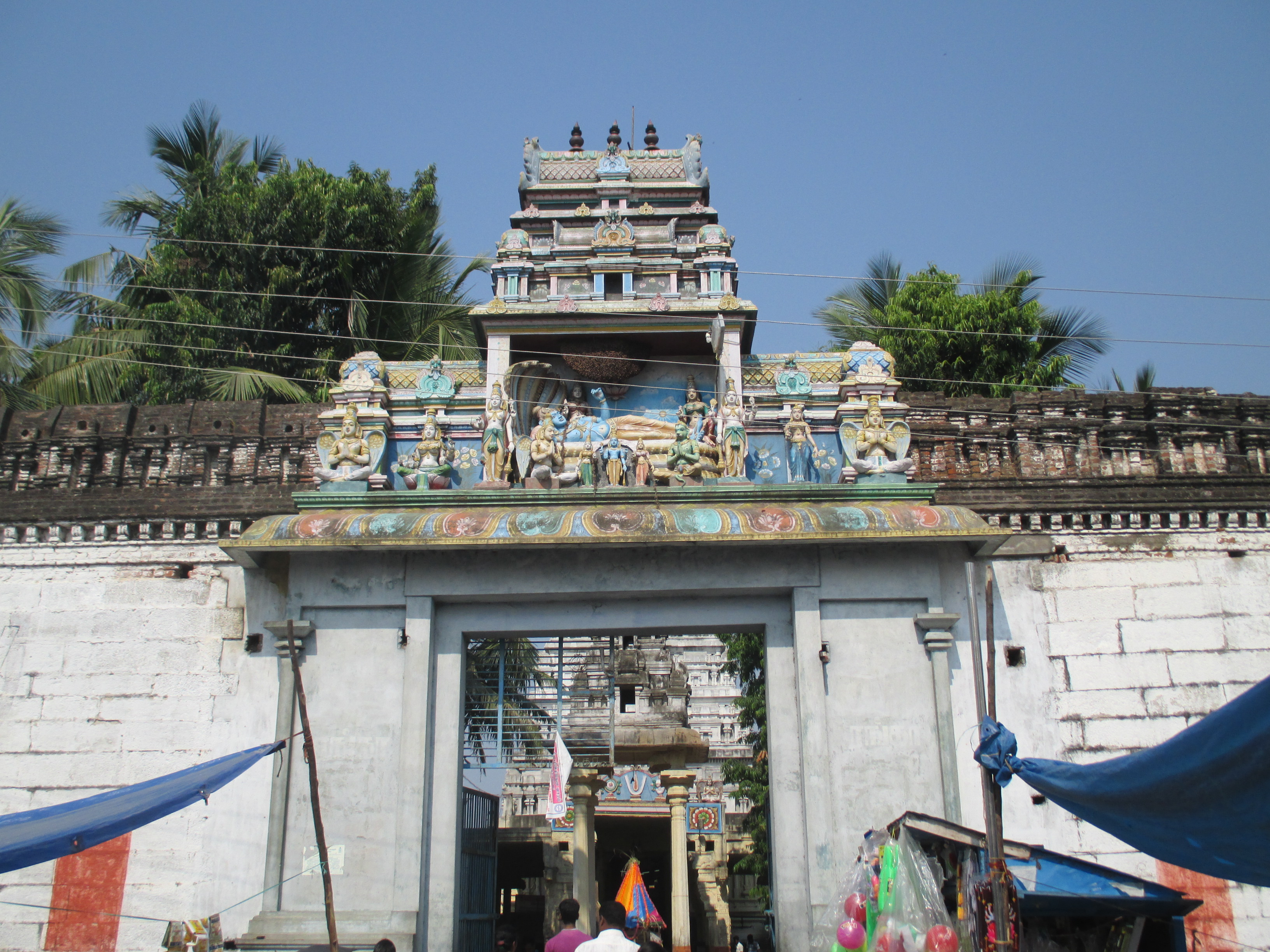

- Location in Tamil Nadu

Religion
- Affiliation: Hinduism
- District: Kallakurichi
- Deity: Ranganatha Perumal (Vishnu), Ranganayagi (Lakshmi)

Location
- Location: Adhi Thiruvarangam
- State: Tamil Nadu
- Country: India
- Coordinates: 12°00′10″N 79°03′42″E

Architecture
- Type: Dravidian architecture
- Creator: Medieval Cholas Vijayanagara kings

Adhirangam Ranganathaswamy temple or Old Srirangam Ranganatha Perumal Temple is a Hindu temple dedicated to Vishnu located in Adhi Thiruvarangam in the Taluk of Sankarapuram, Tamil Nadu, India. Constructed in the Dravidian style of architecture, it is believed to have been built by the Medieval Cholas and Vijayanagar kings. It covers an area of 5 acres (20,000 m^{2}) and has a historical grain storage container. It is classified one among the 108 Abhimana Kshethram of Vaishnavate tradition.

Ranganatha Perumal is believed to have appeared to king Mahabali and the Alvars at the temple's site. Six daily rituals and a dozen yearly festivals are held there, of which the chariot festival, celebrated during the Tamil month of Chittirai (March–April), is the most prominent. The temple is open from 6 am to 7:30 pm. It is maintained and administered by the Hindu Religious and Endowment Board of the Government of Tamil Nadu.

== Legend ==
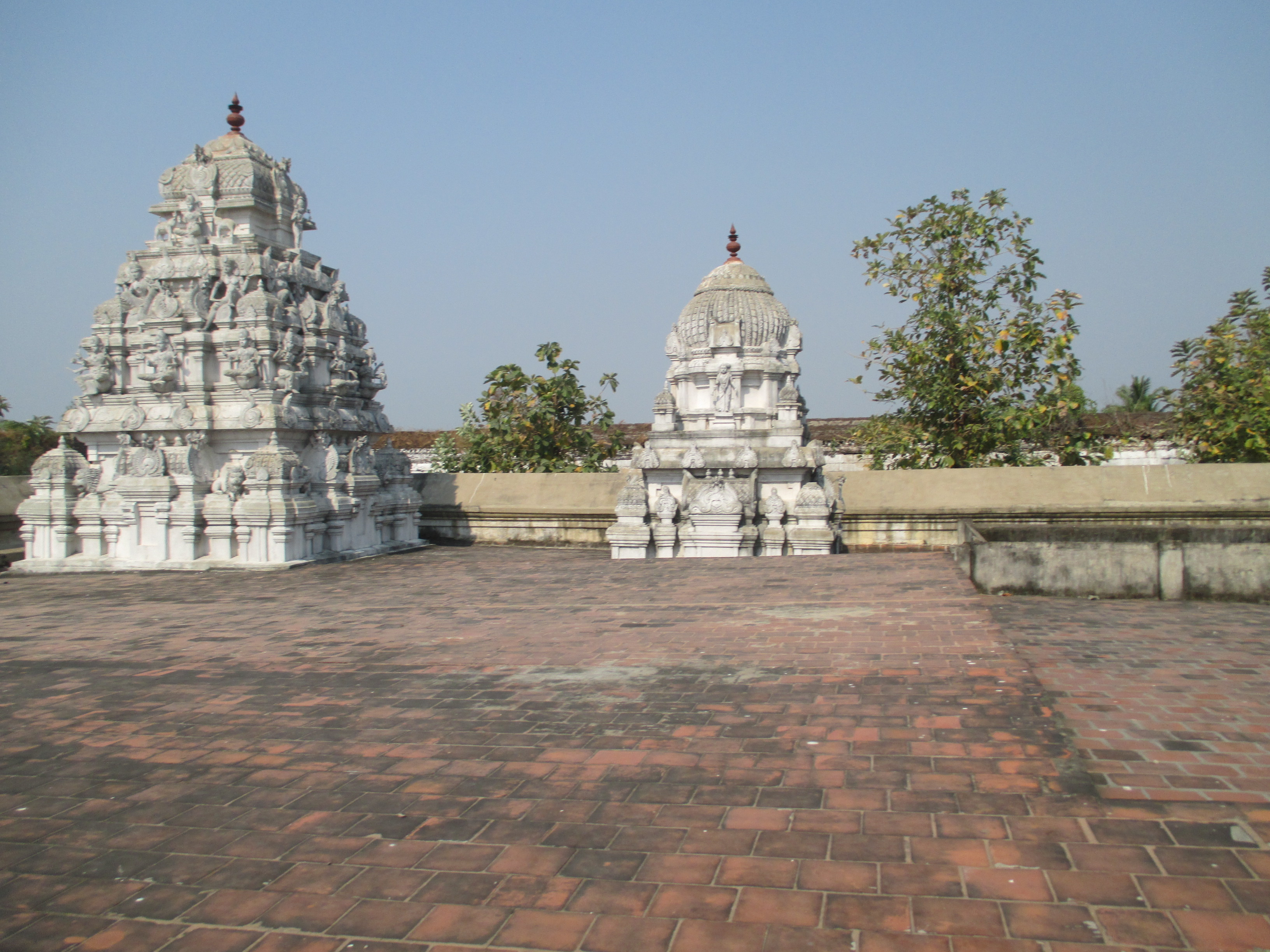
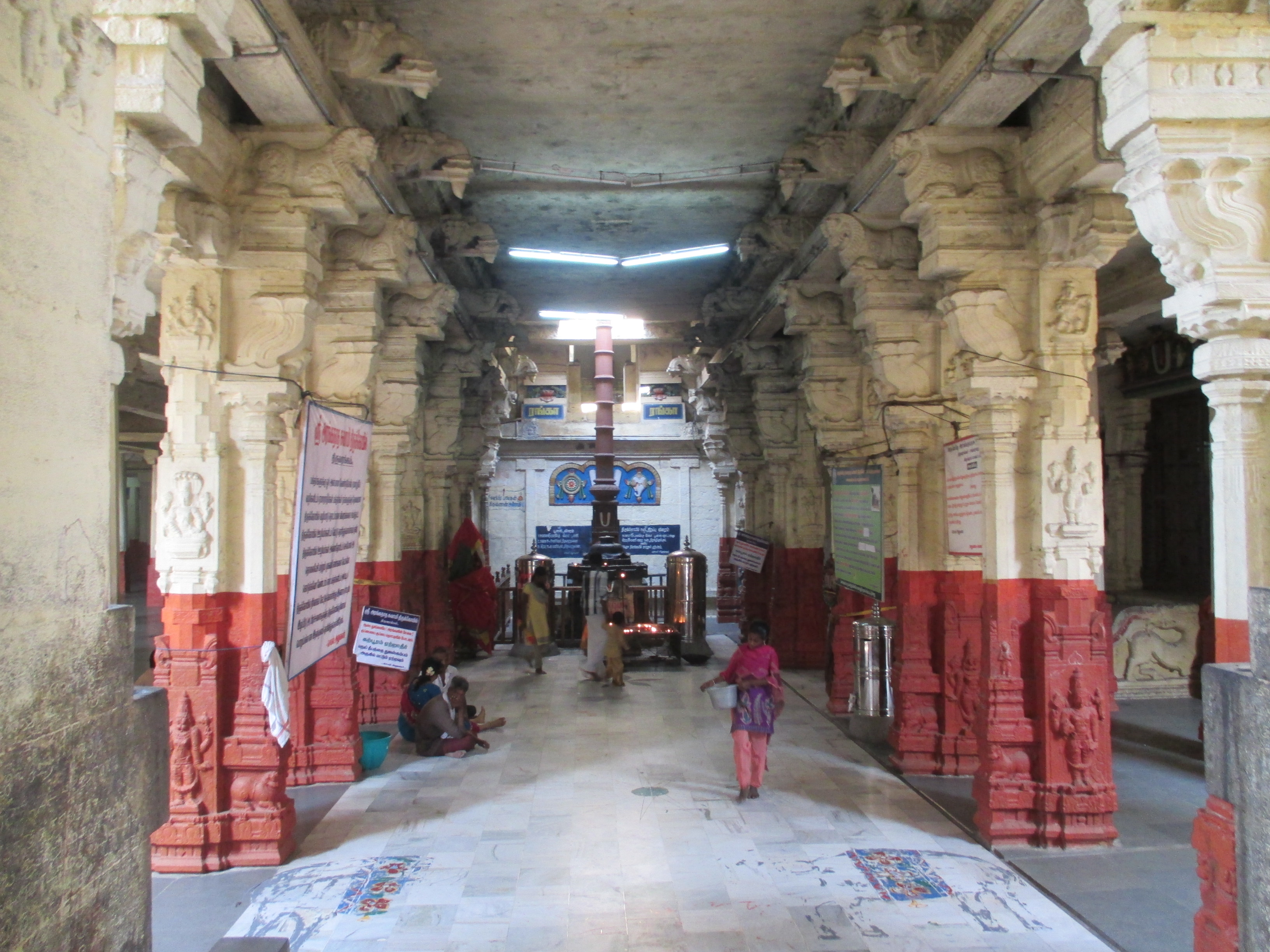
Shrines of the temple

As per Hindu legend, a demon king named Somukan stole all the Vedas from the Devas and all the sages were worried. They appealed to Vishnu, who appeared as Ranganatha at this place to emerge from water to rescue the scriptures. He is also believed to have advised Brahma at this place. As per another legend, a king named Surakeerthi who was childless worshipped Vishnu at this place to get children. Chandra, the moon god, lost all his glow on account of a curse he incurred. The celestial deities advised him to worship Vishnu at this place. He established a tank and worshipped Ranganatha with the holy waters and believed to have been relieved off his curse. The temple tank, Chandra Pushkarani, is believed to be the tank he established. The celestial deities wanted Vishnu to show them his true form during a night time. Pleased by their devotion, Vishnu is believed to have appeared in Rangantha form and give darshan permanently.

== Architecture ==
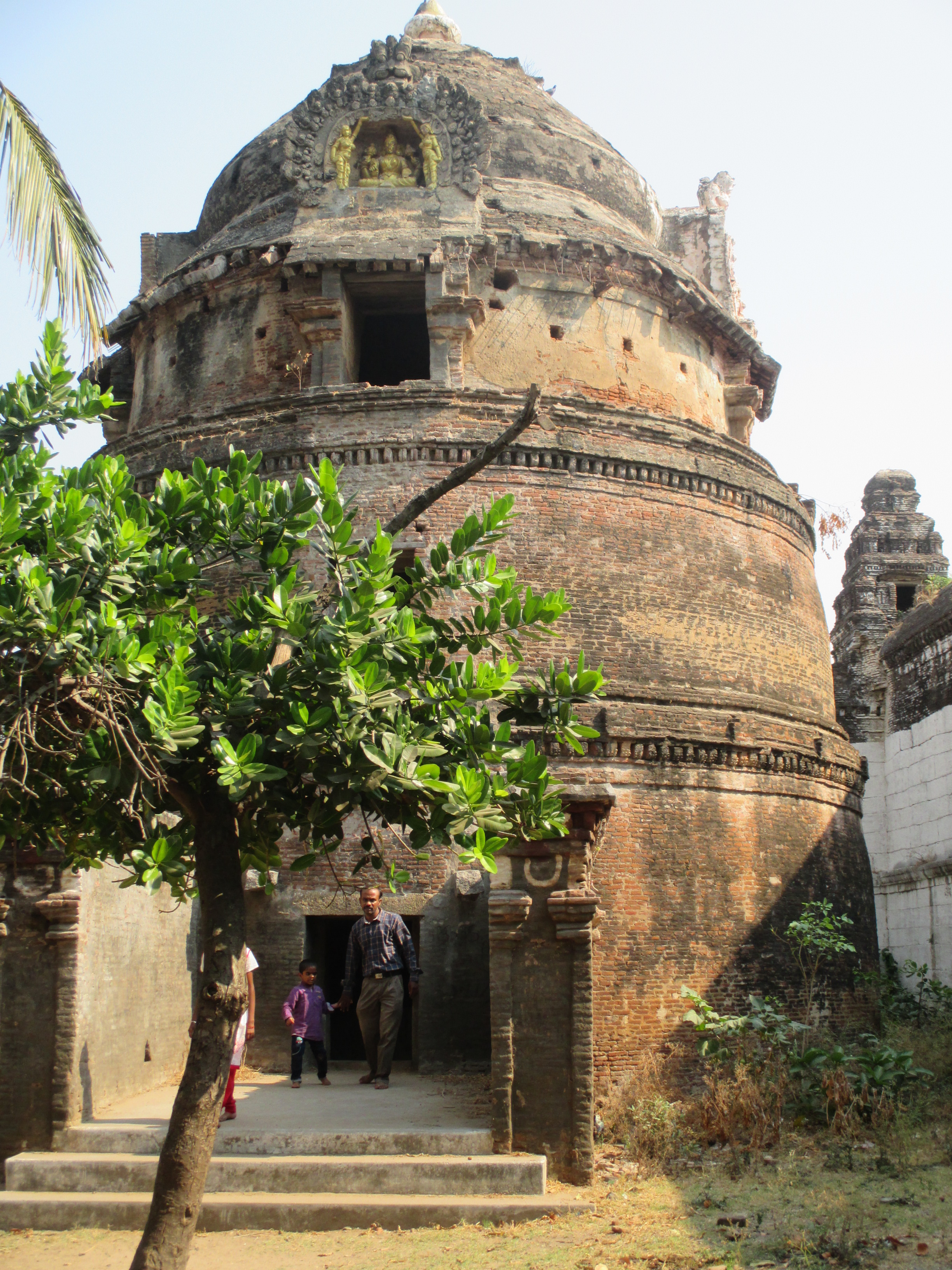
The historical granary

The images of Alvars are housed in the hall preceding the sanctum. The central shrine is approached from the gopuram axially through a four pillared mani mandapam and pillared halls of mukha mandapam and artha mandapam. The shrine of Ranganayaki, the consort of Ranganathar is located in a shrine parallel to the sanctum. The temple has a historical grain storage container made of brick located in the south east corner of the temple. The granary is one of its kind as in other temples like Srirangam, Jambukeswarar Temple at Tiruvanaikaval and Palaivananathar Temple at Papanasam. It is believed that farmers in the region store their grains in the temple, which also accommodates contributions of the donors to the temple. In modern times, the temple is maintained and administered by the Hindu Religious and Charitable Endowments Department of the Government of Tamil Nadu.

== Religious significance ==
It is considered one among the 108 Abhimana Kshethram of Vaishnavate tradition. The temple is considered a Periya Perumal temple, meaning the image of presiding Ranganathar is larger than the one found at Ranganathar Temple at Srirangam. As per the temple records, the temple is believed to be older than the Ranganathaswamy temple at Srirangam and hence came to be known as Adhi Rangam, meaning the original Rangam. Following the legend of Moon gaining his sheen, the temple tank where Chandra obtained his sheen back is called Chandrapushkarani, otherwise the Thenpennai River. The Ranga Vimanam given to Vibhishana and was installed in Srirangam temple, is believed to have been formed naturally in this temple. The Ranga vimanam in the temple is in the form of Om, is believed to be an amalgamated form of Vaishnavism. The festive deity is taken to a hill named Maiyanoor, located 30 km (19 mi) away from the temple. It is believed that Kedilam River was formed in the hill when Garuda scratched the hill with his beak.
