= Sree Krishna Swami Temple, Thodupuzha =

Hindu temple in Kerala, India

Thodupuzha Sree Krishna Swami Temple
- തൊടുപുഴ ശ്രീകൃഷ്ണ സ്വാമി ക്ഷേത്രം
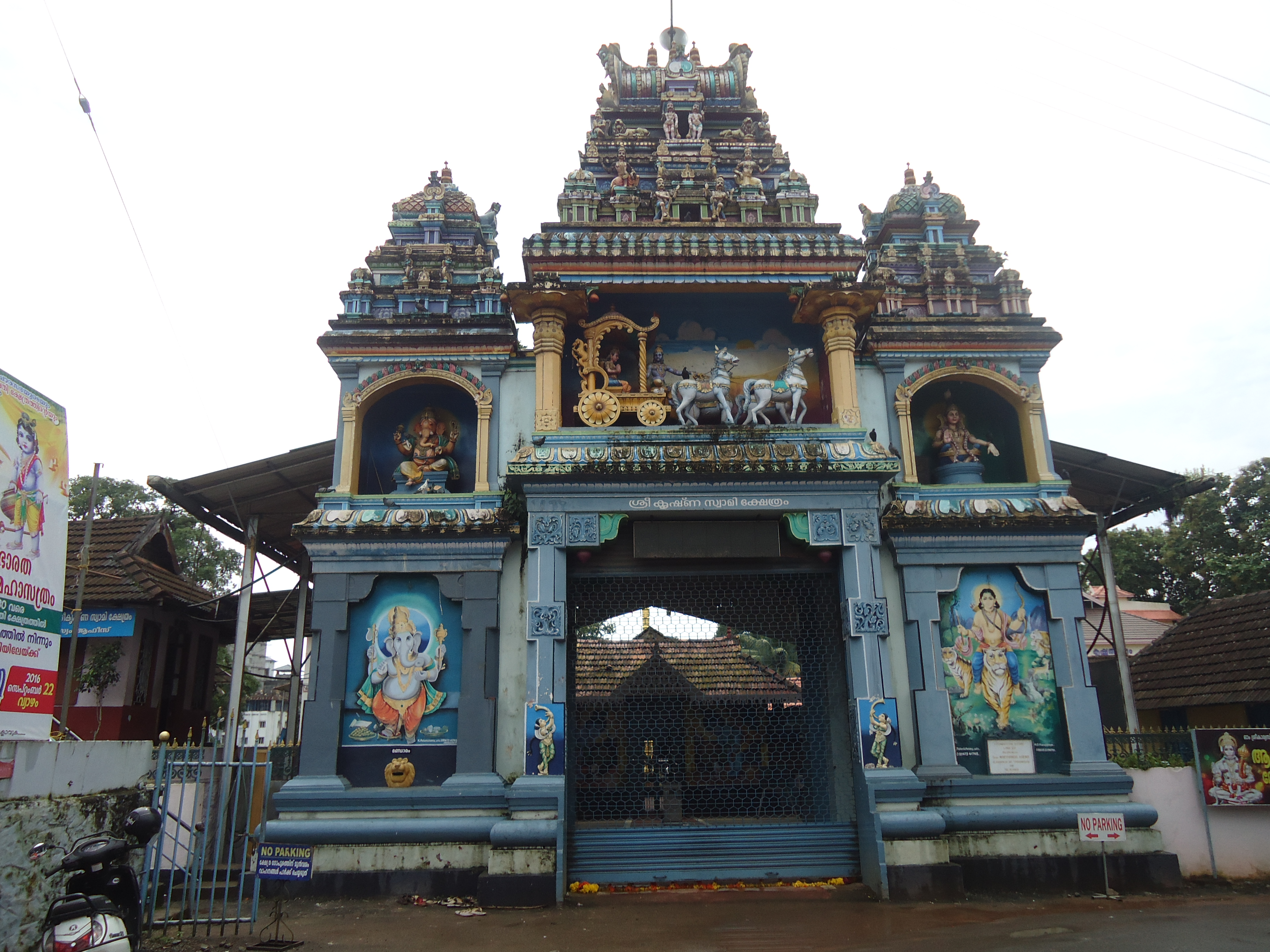
- Temple Gopuram (tower)

- Sree Krishna Swamy Temple, Thodupuzha, Idukki, Kerala

Religion
- Affiliation: Hinduism
- District: Idukki
- Deity: Krishna
- Governing body: Board of trustees

Location
- Location: Thodupuzha
- State: Kerala
- Country: India
- Interactive map of Thodupuzha Sree Krishna Swami Temple
- Coordinates: 9°53′57.1″N 76°42′41.8″E

Architecture
- Type: Traditional Kerala style
- Creator: Keezhmalainadu Raja

Specifications
- Temple: One
- Elevation: 51.09 m (168 ft)

Sree Krishna Swami Temple is a Hindu temple situated at the heart of Thodupuzha town in Idukki district in the Indian state of Kerala. It is located on the banks of Thodupuzhayar, a tributary of river Muvattupuzha. Lord Krishna presides there in the form of Navaneetha Krishna who holds butter in his right pam. The tantric rights of the temple is held by the Aramallur Kavanattu Mana. The Poojas are conducted by two mutts named as 'Padinjare mutt' and 'Thuruthel mutt'.

== Beliefs ==
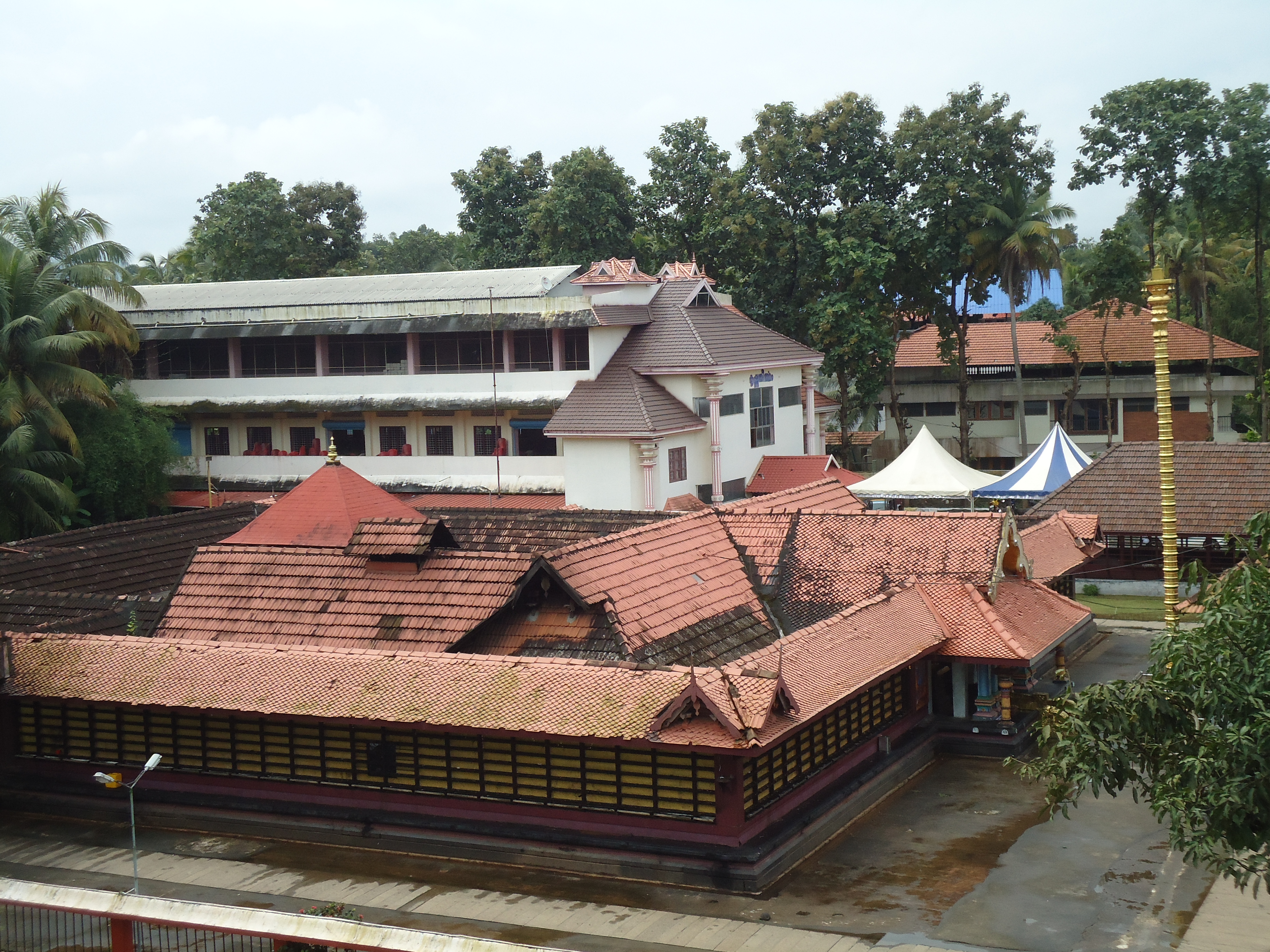
The main shrine of the complex

The origin of the temple is associated with many beliefs which date backs to the ancient era. Popular myths has it that once a wandering Brahmin who was on a pilgrimage to the various temples reached here and got a divine vision of Lord Krishna. After getting the vision of Krishna, he purified his body in the nearby river (Thodupuzhayar) and offered Nivedyam to the deity by lighting a lamp. This was on the day of Chothi in the Malayalam month of Meenam. This incident is commonly believed to be the prime reason for the temple's origin. Later, the raja of Keezhmalanadu constructed a shrine for the deity and consecrated an idol. At present, the famous Chothioottu feast is conducted in the temple which offers food free of cost to the pilgrims who arrives here. The temple is now under the administration of board of trustees.

== Poojas ==
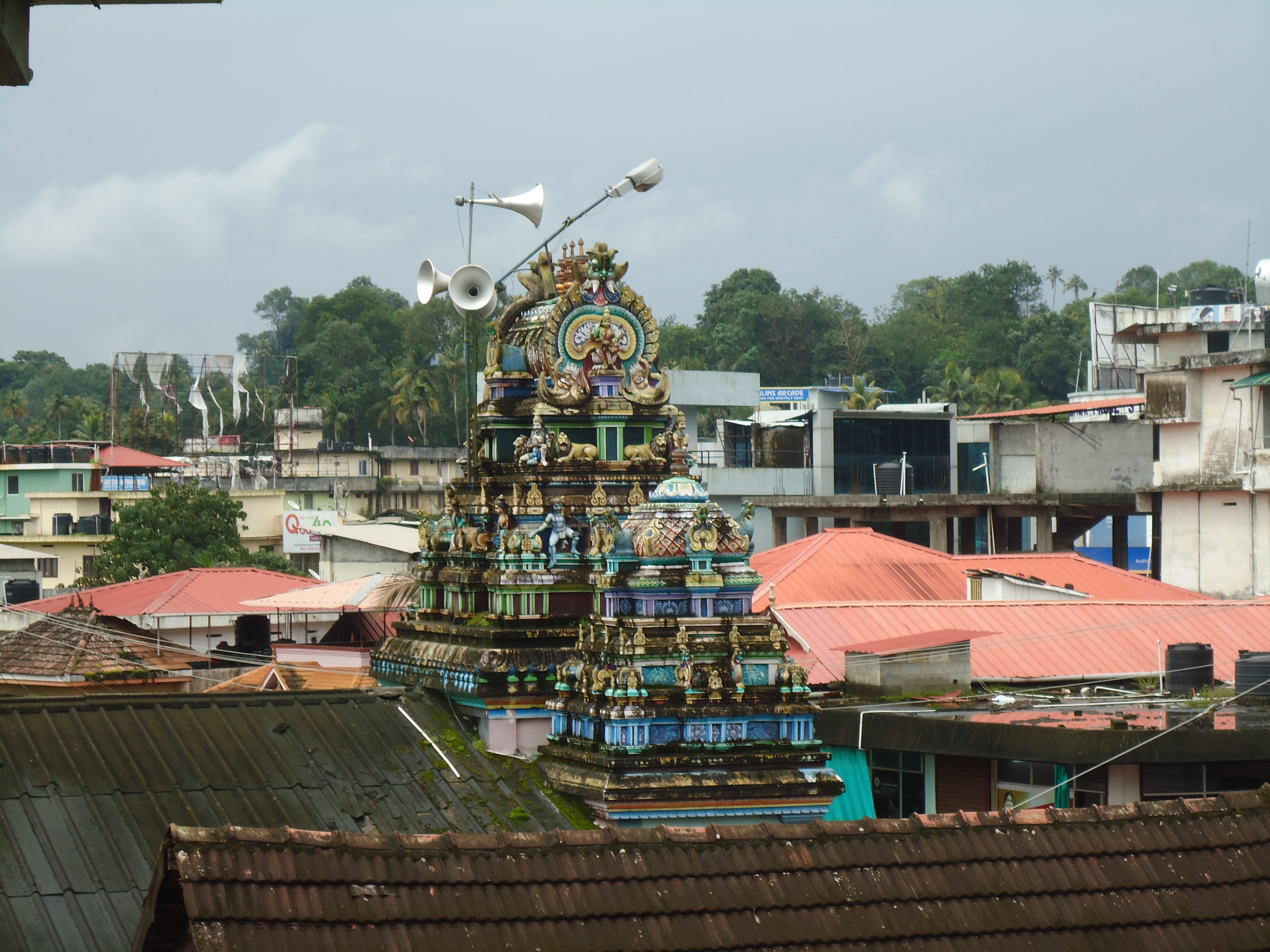

The morning section includes the 'Usha pooja' followed by the 'Abhishekam'. The flower garlands of the previous day are removed every morning. 'Nilapaduthara' or the holy platform is situated in front of the temple where the saint received the idol of deity. The idol is taken out of the sanctum sanctorum on the festival occasions to this platform and is taken back with fully decorated. The main offerings to the deity are owl and pigeon.

== Festivals ==
The annual festival is hosted in the Malayalam month of Meenam (March/April). Utsav Bali, a sacred ceremony is conducted on the ninth day of festivities accompanied by the presence of thousands of devotees. This temple also have one of the earliest and largest 'Kalyana Mandapam' or wedding hall in central Travancore region named as 'Krishna Theertham'.

== Subordinate deities ==
The temple has Bhagavathy, Shiva, Ganapathi, Ayyappa and Nāga as subordinate deities.
