= Sree Vasudevapuram Mahavishnu Temple =

Hindu Temple in India

- Sree Vasudevapuram Mahavishnu Temple, Kunnukara, Ernakulam, Kerala

Religion
- Affiliation: Hinduism
- District: Ernakulam
- Deity: Mahavishnu, Ashtalakshmi
- Festival: Ashwina Pournami Mahalakshmi Pooja

Location
- Location: Kunnukara
- State: Kerala
- Country: India
- Interactive map of Sree Vasudevapuram Mahavishnu Temple
- Coordinates: 10.162087°N 76.325864°E

Architecture
- Type: Architecture of Kerala

Specifications
- Temple: One
- Elevation: 32.43 m (106 ft)

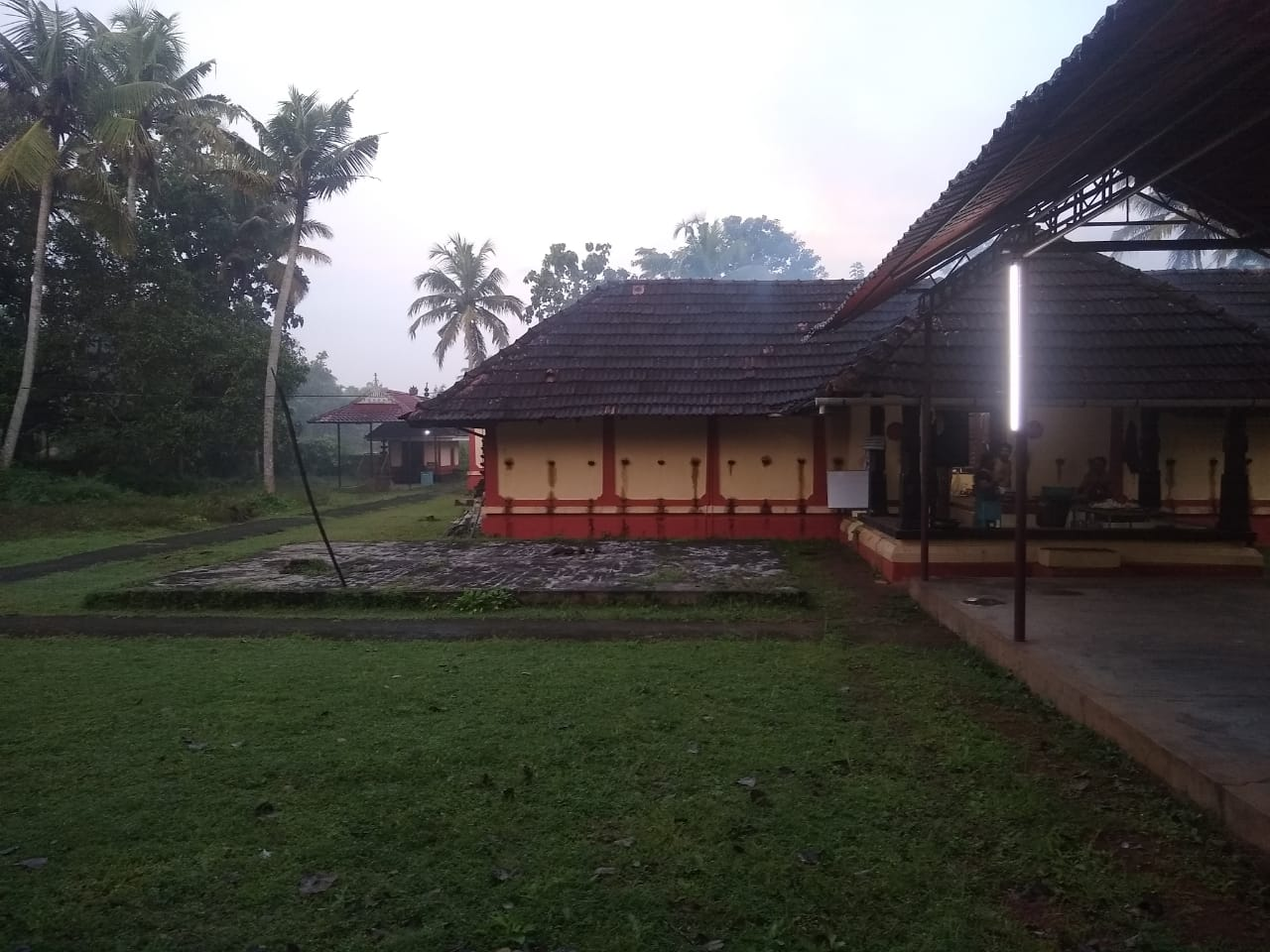
Temple Premises

Sree Vasudevapuram Mahavishnu Temple is an Indian temple located about 9 Kilometers westward of Cochin International Airport in Kunnukara panchayath in the suburbs of aluva (District Ernakulam) in the state of Kerala. It is believed to be consecrated by Maharshi Parashuraman. The presence of Mahalakshmi is felt along with Lord Vishnu.

== Legend ==
Maharshi Parasurama consecrated the idol of Mahavishnu in such a concept that the Lord is embracing Goddess Mahalakshmi. After the consecration the Maharshi entrusted the temple responsibilities to some local Brahmins. These Brahmins became prosperous of wealth by the blessings of Goddess Mahalakshmi. But later they became indifferent to the activities of the temple which brought about their downfall. The temple also lost its wealth and glory in the course of time.

After a long period Vilwamangalam Swamikal, a great disciple of Lord Guruvayoorappan visited the temple. He had the vision of Mahalakshmi engaged in the service of Lord Mahavishnu.

The Swamikal was surprised to see the poor condition of the temple where there was physical presence of the Lord and the Goddess. He asked Devi, the cause of the loss of prosperity of the temple and the poverty of the people living in that area even though her presence was there. She replied that the officials of the temple and the people were not taking care of the temple rituals and so she was busy serving the Lord. As a result, she did not have time to attend to the prayers of the people.

Vilwamangalam Swamikal then told Devi that if the prayers of the devotees are not answered, they will stop visiting the temple and turn into atheists. He requested Devi to provide some time to hear the prayers of the devotees visiting the temple. On hearing the request of Swamikal, Devi promised him that she'll give Darshan to devotees once a year.

But Swamikal was not satisfied with that. He again requested Mahalakshmi that as different people needs different blessings like fame, health, knowledge, success in job, good and prolonged married life etc. in addition to wealth. Up on the sincere request from Samikal, Devi replied that her presence will be felt in the temple and shall shower up the blessings on her devotees for the 8 days starting with Akshaya Tritiya in the month of Vaisakha (April / May) in 8 different forms as Ashtalakshmi i.e. Veeralakshmi, Gajalakshmi, Santhanalakshmi, Vijayalakshmi, Dhanyalakshmi, Adilakshmi, Dhanalakshmi and Mahalakshmi respectively .

Henceforth the ritual of Tambula Samarpanam became an important offering in this temple during these 8 days.

== Rituals ==
=== Tambula Samarpanam ===
Tambula Samarpanam is a very holy and important ritual which can only be performed on these 8 days starting from Akashya Tritiya. This is an offering in which 3 betel leaves, arecanut and money according to the devotees ability is placed before Lord Vishnu and Mahalakshmi with dedication and a request of prayer. This offering is done with a sense of deep devotion and reverence and it is reputed to bring fulfilment of genuine desires. It is believed that couples who visit the temple on these days will be blessed with a prosperous and happy family life.

== Offerings ==
=== Rice and turmeric Para ===
This is a very divine and unique offering of Sreevasudevapuram Mahavishnu Temple which can only be performed during the 8 days of Thamboola Samarpanam. The devotee performing this offer has to fill in two measuring pots (Para) with Rice and Turmeric chanting divine mantras. A purohit (priest) will advise the mantras. It is believed that the person performing this offering becomes the maid (servant) of Goddess Mahalakshmi. The maid prepares turmeric as cosmetic for the goddess and rice as food for the Lord. In turn she prayers for prolonged happy married life, betterment of children, health and wealth for her family. The meaning of the Mantras chanted is also the same. No male devotes are allowed to perform this offering.

=== Tirumadhuram ===
The offering includes ‘Kadali’ bananas, ‘Palpayasam’ and Appam for the fulfilment of the desires of devotees.

=== Moonnu Uruli Nivedyam ===
This is another unique offering of Sreevasudevapuram Mahavishnu temple which can be performed on any day throughout the year. Tirumadhuram, Palpayasam and Appam are served in three different Uruli's (Pots) made of Gold, Silver and Bronze respectively. Devotees perform this offering for the fulfilment of genuine desires like good Job, Marriage, blessing for children, success in business etc. This offering can only be performed with advance booking.

=== Muzhukkappu ===
‘Muzhukkappu’ is another important offering which many people conduct for becoming prosperous. The idol of Lord is decorated with pure sandalwood.

== Other festival of the temple ==
=== Ashwina Powrnami Mahalakshmi Pooja ===
This is held on the full moon day (Pournami) in the month of ‘Aswina’. Various Archanas are performed by chanting divine mantras like Lakshmi Sahsranamam, Kanakadhara Stotram and Mahalakshmi Ashtakam. People believe that the performance of these Archanas and recitation of mantras will bring prosperity and good luck.

== Important days ==
- Astami – Rohini,
- Thiru Onam
- Poumami in the month of Aswina
- Akshaya Tritiya and following 7 days.

== Distance to the temple ==
From

1. Cochin International Airport – 9 km
2. Ernakulam Junction Railway Station – 30 km
3. Ernakulam Town Railway Station – 28 km
4. Angamaly Town – 11 km
5. Aluva Town – 12 km
