= Veppathur =

- town panchayat
- Location in Tamil Nadu, India
- Coordinates: 11.016352°N 79.433577°E
- Country: India
- State: Tamil Nadu
- District: Thanjavur

Population (2001)
  - Total: 7,414

Languages
  - Official: Tamil
- Time zone: UTC+5:30 (IST)
- PIN: 612105

Veppathur is a panchayat town in Thanjavur district in the Indian state of Tamil Nadu.

Veppathur was originally known as Nimmapuram (meaning "Neem Village" in Sanskrit). It is located approximately 5 km from Thiruvidaimaruthur and about 9 km from Kumbakonam.

The Economy of the village is mainly relayed on agriculture. Rice, Sugarcane, Cotton and green gram are cultivated in the fields around the village.

== Demographics ==
As of 2001 India census, Veppathur had a population of 7414. Males constitute 50% of the population and females 50%. Veppathur has an average literacy rate of 66%, higher than the national average of 59.5%: male literacy is 75%, and female literacy is 57%. In Veppathur, 11% of the population is under 6 years of age.
