= Kattalagar =

Hindu temple in Tamil Nadu, India

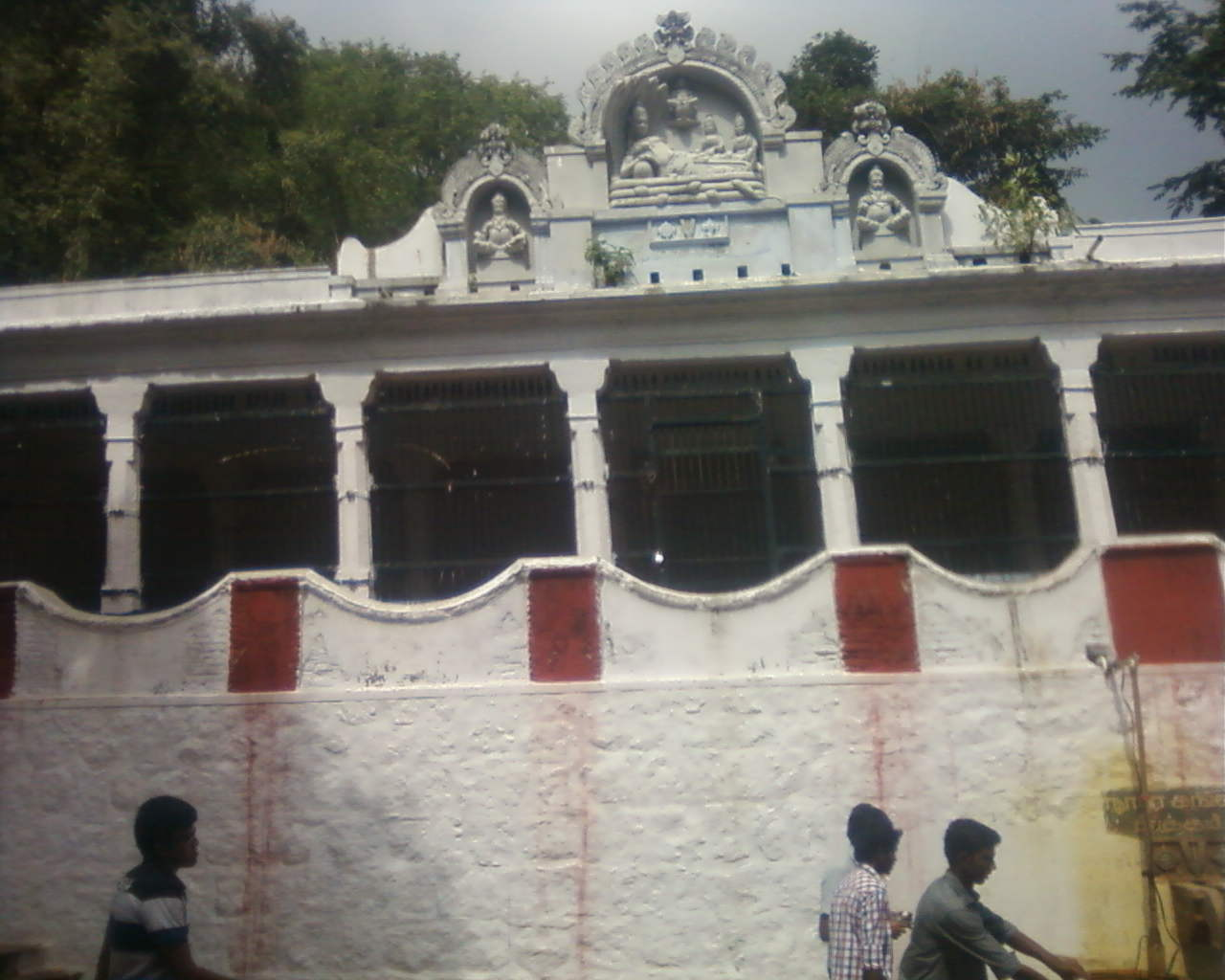

Kattalagar Koil is a temple in Tamil Nadu, India.

== Gallery ==
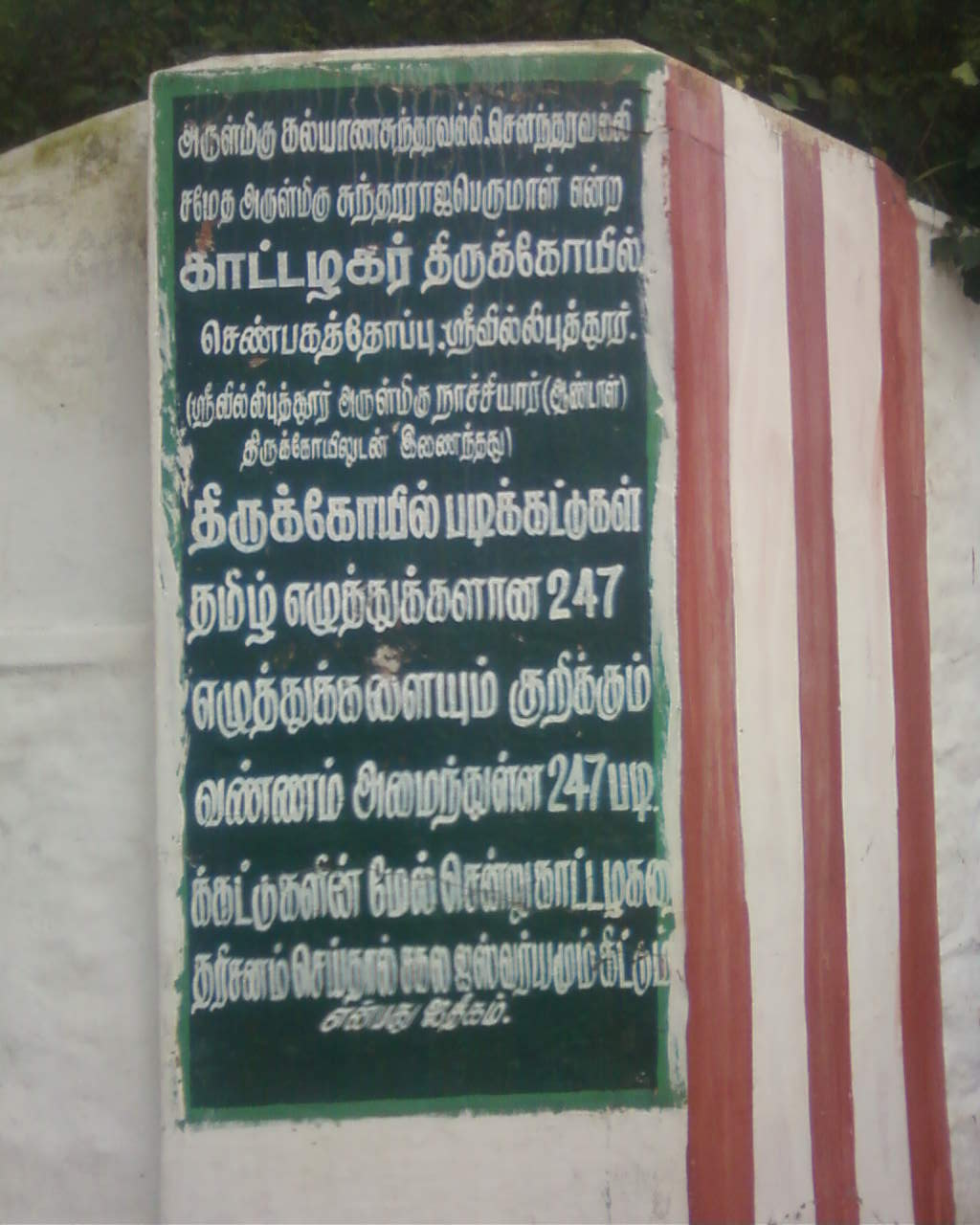

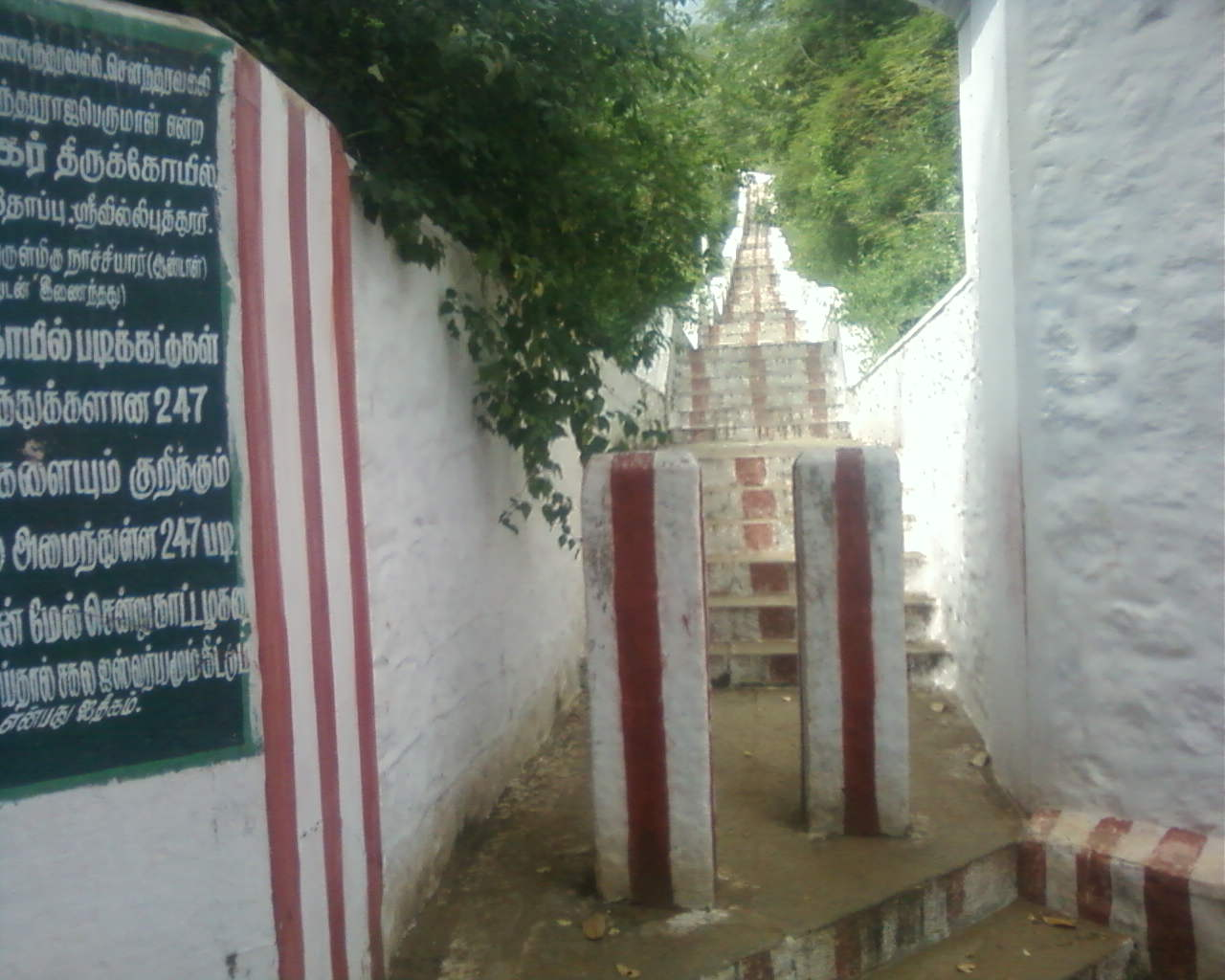

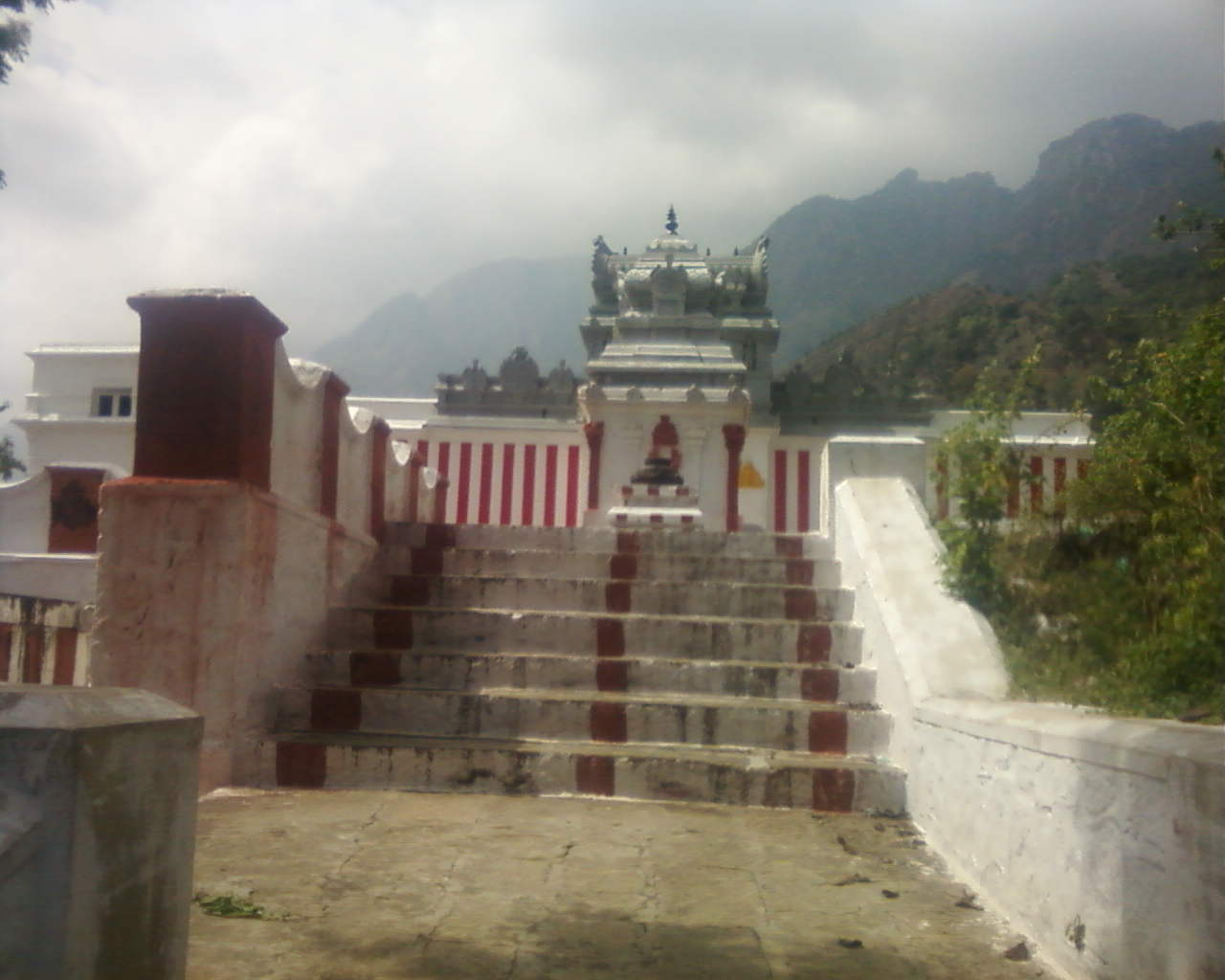

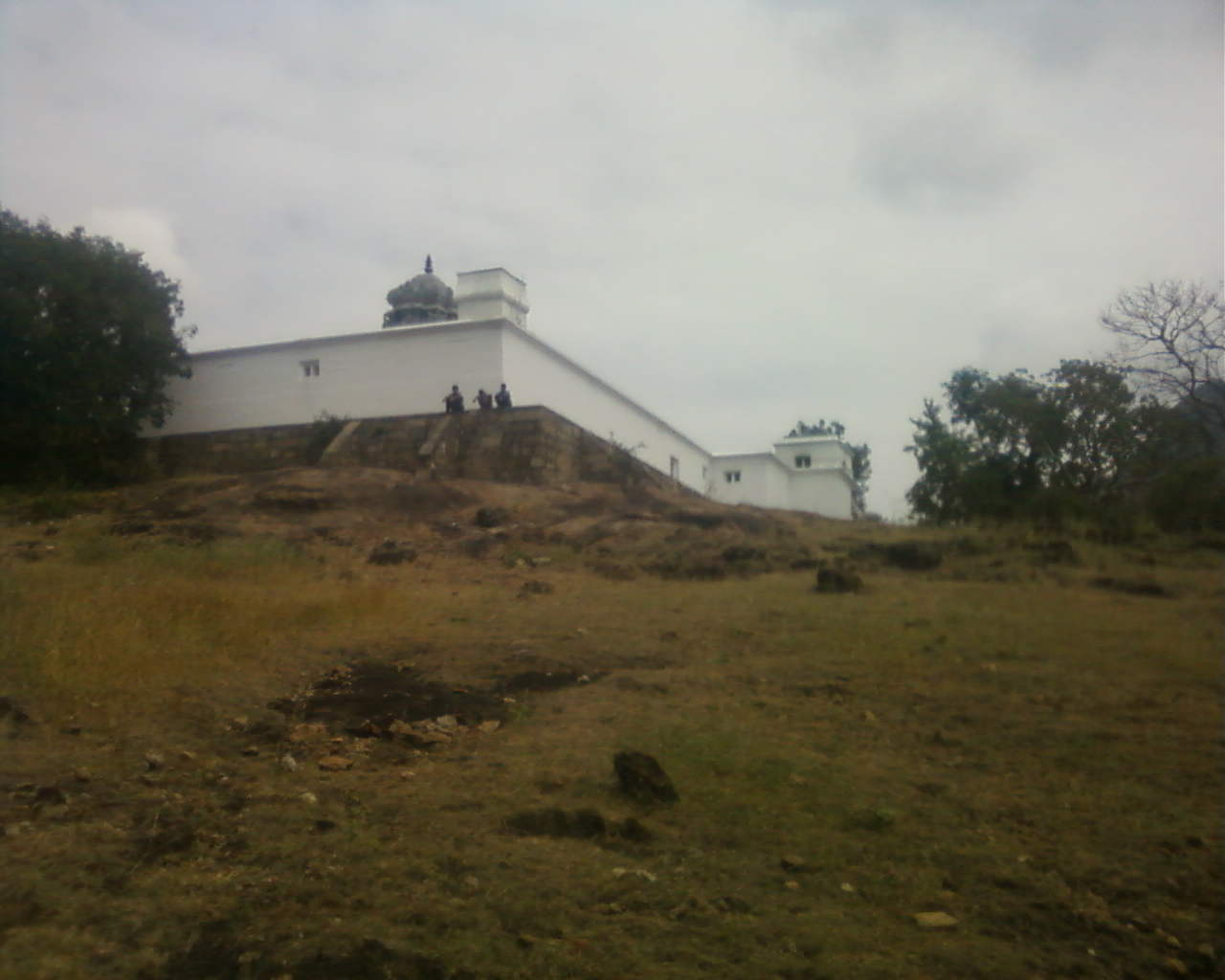
