= Kattu Narasimhaperumal Temple, Srirangam =

Kattu Narasimhaperumal Temple
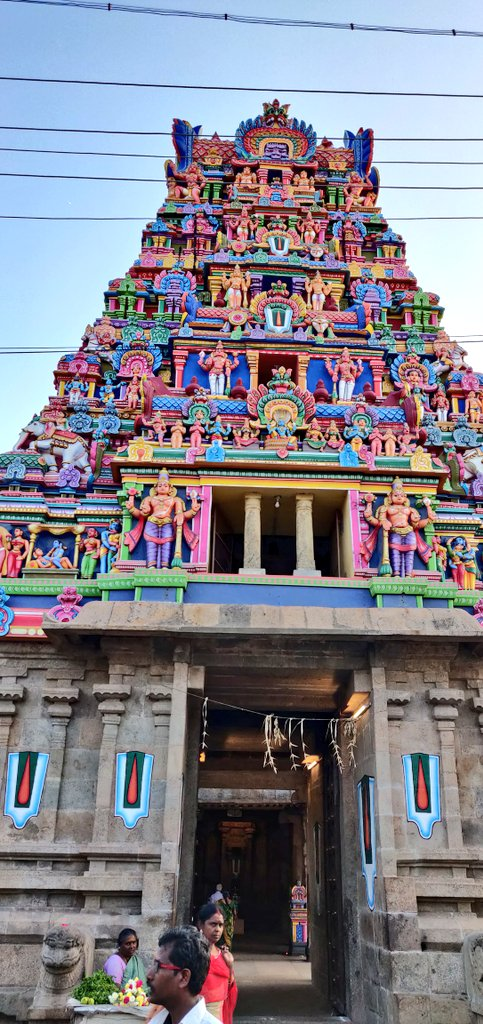
- Kattu Narasimha Perumal temple

- Location in Tamil Nadu

Religion
- Affiliation: Hinduism

Location
- Location: Srirangam
- State: Tamil Nadu
- Country: India

Architecture
- Type: Dravidian architecture
- Creator: Vallabadevan
- Completed: 9th century

The Kattu Narasimhaperumal Temple is a Hindu temple situated in the suburb of Srirangam in Tiruchirappalli, India. It is also known as Azhagiya Singar temple and is situated at a distance of 1 kilometre from the Srirangam railway station.

The temple is also called traditionally "Ekaanthanthaman Koil" meaning "calm and quiet ambience" temple. It is widely believed that the presiding deity grants boons to devotees and is aptly called "Varaprasaaadhi" (boon giver).The temple does not find a mention in Nalayira Divya Prabhandams, and thus is not listed in Divya Desam group of 108 temples. But it is classified as one of the most important Abhimana sthalam out of the 108.

== Dating the temple ==
The temple was built by the Pandyan King Vallabadevan who was a devotee of Sri Periazhwar in the ninth century CE. The Kattu Narasimhaperumal Temple is a Hindu temple situated in the suburb of Srirangam in Tiruchirappalli, India. It is also known as Azhagiya Singar temple and is situated at a distance of 1 kilometre from the Srirangam railway station

However as per legend and folklore the temple predates the Sri Ranganathaswamy Temple, Srirangam and is one of the oldest temples in the city. Some attribute the temple to be of 5th century CE.

== Temple history ==
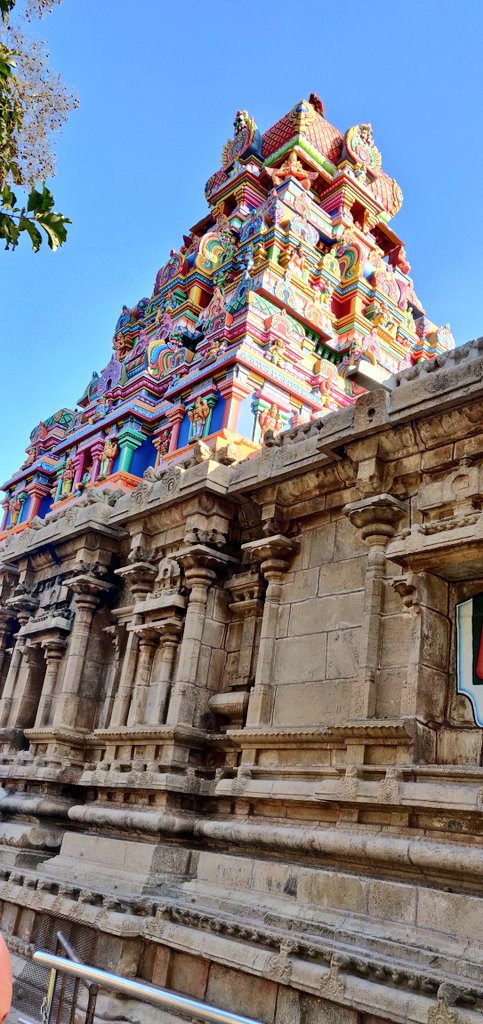
Side view of the temple.

In the 12th century CE Sri Pillailokachariar conducted his daily kalakshepam (discourse) on "Vaishnava siddhaantha rahasyangal" (Secrets of the Vaishnava tradition) to his devotees in this temple. Sri Manavalamamunigal in the 15th century took over temple administration as per the request of the Pandyan ruler Srisindarapandian. The pandyan king provided for temple maintenance.

The Temple entrance arch was built as ordained by Sri Kaattazhgaiyasingar and dedicated in the presence of Sriman Sriranga Narayana Jeeyar of Srirangam temple (Periakoil Jeeyar). More devotees became followers of the deity from there on.

== Festivals ==
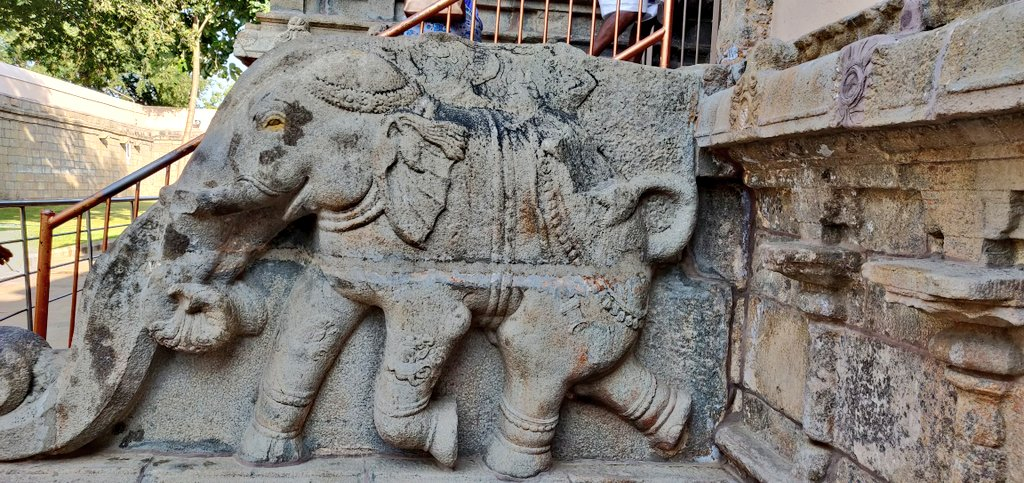
Sculpture at the temple.

=== Jyeshtabhishekam ===
Holy water from the river Kollidam is brought by elephant to the temple and Jyeshtabhishekam (divine ablution) is performed.

=== Sahasra Deepam ===
A thousand lamps are lit during the Sashradeepam. It occurs during the first Sunday in the Tamil month of Karthigai.

=== Pradosham ===
On days of pradosham days, devotees get special darshan (viewing) of Azhagiyasinga Perumal (presiding deity of the temple).
