= Kalyana Varadharaja Perumal Temple =

Perumal Temple in Thiruvarur district, Tamil Nadu

Kalyana Varadharaja Perumal Temple is a temple in Paruthiyur, Sengalipuram, Thiruvarur District, India. The temple is located on the banks of the Kudamurutti River, a distributary of the River Kaveri.

== Idols ==
=== Adhi Varadharaja Perumal ===
Adhi Varadharaja Perumal is the temple's main idol, which bestows "Prayoga-Chakra". This chakra is believed to have been sent to protect King Ambarisha, a Vishnu devotee, from the curse of Durvasa, a famous sage. Durvasa created a demon to kill Ambarisha out of a strand of his hair. Ambarisha prayed to his Vishnu, and Lord Narayana's Sudarshana intervened and destroyed the demon.

Sudarshana Chakra

Sudarshana Chakra or the divine disc of Maha Vishnu is one of Vishnu's weapons, used to annihilate evil forces. It is in the Prayoga state. It is believed that it is this Chakra was used by Lord Vishnu against Durvasa. Hence there are also no houses built on the south side of the street across the Temple.

Kalyana Varadaraja Perumal

Kalyana Varadharajar, another Vishnu, was also erected in the temple. This Permua bestows well-being to bhaktas. The panchaloha Utsava idols of this temple are 10th century Chola bronze.

== Festivals ==
The temple is open to the public in the mornings and evenings.

Rama Navami is a grand ten-day festival. Special pujas are performed during Paruthiyur Periyava Aradanai, Vaikunta, Navaratri, Deepavali, Vaikunta Ekadesi, and Hanuman Jayanthi.

Panguni Brahmotsava is an annual celebration with kalyana utsavam and veedi ula.

== Prasadham ==
Panagam, Buttermilk, and Sundal are the popular prasadhams made and distributed to devotees during the festive seasons.

== History ==
The temple was built in the early 19th century by Paruthiyur Sri Krishna Sastri (1768–1842), believed to be a Vishnu Bhakta and popularly known as Ayyaval. He lived during the rule of Serfoji II Maharaja. Ayyaval had spent most of his time in this temple with his parayanams of the Vishnu Purana and the Ramayana, teaching the scriptures, spreading bhakti, and promoting Hinduism.

He was an authority over the Vaishnava traditions. Ayyaval addressed several issues by answering the queries on Dharma Sastram and acharam, often posed to them by Vedic scholars and pundits. His authority on the administration of dharma made many legal luminaries come to them seeking their advice on issues concerning Hindu law. Paruthiyur Sri Krishna Sastri Ayyaval along with his brother Paruthiyur Sri Venkatesha Sastri Annaval (1765–1837) were the doyen brothers of Paruthiyur and for the Hindu Religion.

Later, the temple became the life and soul of a Mahaan Paruthiyur Periyava, Bramasri Krishna Sastri. He was considered a Rama Bhakta, a Ramayana exponent, Philanthropist, and a Pravachan Pioneer. He renovated the temple and installed Mahalakshmi, Kodandarama Parivaar sannadhis, and constructed the temple tank Kodadhandarama Threertham known as the Melakulam.

== See also ==
- Pravachan
- Ramayana
- Vishnu Purana
