= Jaganmata =

Epithet of the Hindu goddess Lakshmi

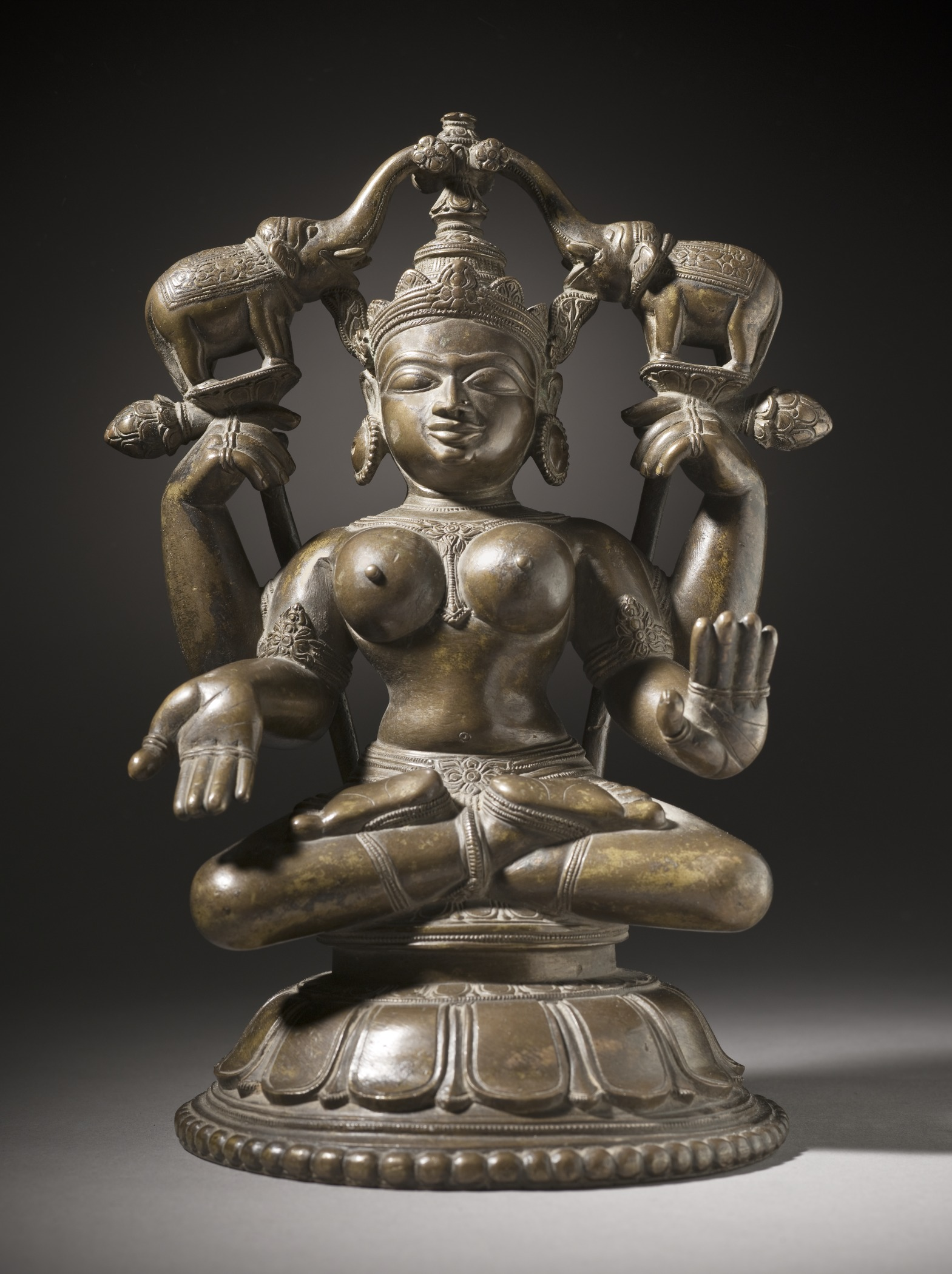
- Sculpture of Lakshmi
- Other names: Sri; Mahadevi; Lokamata
- Affiliation: Form of Lakshmi
- Abode: Vaikuntha
- Day: Thursday & Friday
- Consort: Jagannath

Jaganmata (Sanskrit: जगन्माता, romanized: Jaganmātā, lit. 'the mother of the universe'), also rendered as Lokamata, is primarily an epithet of the Hindu deity Lakshmi, the supreme goddess of Vaishnavism.

== Literature ==
=== Atharva Veda ===
A hymn from the Atharva Veda dedicated to Lakshmi prays for a portion of the Jaganmata to reside upon one's tongue.

According to this text, since Vishnu is omnipresent, and Lakshmi is regarded to be his divine shakti, she serves him as the mother of the universe that is under his protection.

=== Bhagavata Purana ===
The Bhagavata Purana features a description of Vishnu's form in the form of a prayer, where it describes Lakshmi, the universal mother, tending to the feet of her eternal consort.

=== Lakshmi Tantra ===
In the Lakshmi Tantra, Indra performs a penance for two millennia to meet Lakshmi, and she appears before him upon a lotus, described to be the supreme mother of the universe.

== See also ==
- Mahadevi
- Jagdamba
- Padmavathi
- Ishvari
- Bhargavi
