= Vedanarayana Perumal Temple, Thirunarayanapuram =

Vedanarayana Perumal Temple, Thirunarayana Puram

Religion
- Affiliation: Hinduism
- District: Tiruchirapalli
- Deity: Vedanarayana Perumal (Vishnu) and Vedanayaki Thayar (Lakshmi)

Location
- Location: Thirunarayana puram
- State: Tamil Nadu
- Country: India
- Interactive map of Vedanarayana Perumal Temple, Thirunarayana Puram
- Coordinates: 10.97247°N 78.31816°E

Architecture
- Type: Dravidian architecture

Vedanarayana Perumal Temple is a Hindu temple in the Tiruchirapalli district of Tamil Nadu, India, dedicated to Vishnu as Vedanarayana and Lakshmi as Vedanayaki. Vishnu is in a reclining position with four Vedas as his pillow and Teaching the Vedas to Brahma. The structure is constructed in the Dravidian style of architecture, it is believed to have been built by the Medieval Cholas and Vijayanagar king. It is maintained and administered by the Hindu Religious and Endowment Board of the Government of Tamil Nadu.
