= Chakra Narasimha Temple =

Temple in Odisha, India

Coordinates: 19.801813°N 85.844419°E

Chakrateertha or Chakra Nrusimha Deula (Odia: ଚକ୍ରତୀର୍ଥ, ଚକ୍ର ନୃସିଂହ ଦେଉଳ; Sanskrit: चक्रतीर्थ, चक्र नृसिंह देवालय) is an important pilgrimage site near the sea shore of Puri.

== The Deities ==
The presiding deities of this temple are Abhaya Nrisimha, Chakra Nrisimha and Lakshmi Narasimha. At this temple a large granite wheel is worshipped as Sudarshana Chakra along with an image of Narayana. This is the place where the sacred Daru (wood) for construction of first idol of Jagannath, Balabhadra, Subhadra and Sudarshana Chakra touched ground after floating in the sea and finally was taken by Indradyumna maharaja. It is also an important site as a shrine dedicated to Varuna, the father of Lakshmi or the father-in-law of Jagannath as per legends is constructed.

== See also ==
- Laxmi Puran
