= Vasudeva Perumal Temple =

Religion
- Affiliation: Hinduism
- District: Tiruvarur
- Deity: Lord Vishnu

Location
- Location: Kadagambadi
- State: Tamil Nadu
- Country: India
- Interactive map of Vasudeva Perumal Temple

Architecture
- Type: Dravidian architecture

Vasudeva Perumal Temple is a Hindu temple in the village of Kadagambadi in the Tiruvarur district of Tamil Nadu, India. The temple is dedicated to Vishnu.

== Legend ==
Renounce the fruits of action” was the teaching of Lord Krishna to His chosen disciple Arjuna. Sri Anjaneya began practicing these teaching millenniums earlier. He served Lord Rama without any expectations. While many seek a place in Vaikuntha, the Abode of Lord Vishnu, where Narayana Name is dominant, Anjaneya preferred to stay in Earth where Rama Nama is dominant, so sweet to His heart. He only wanted endless longevity to spend his days chanting Rama Nama. A chola king built this temple on the banks of Arasalaru, a tributary.

== Significance ==
Constructed by a Chola king, the temple is situated on the banks of the Arasalar River and has a shrine to Hanuman. The main idol of Vasudeva Perumal is flanked by his consorts Sridevi and Bhudevi.
