= Madhava Perumal temple, Mylapore =

Vishnu temple in Chennai

Madhava Perumal temple
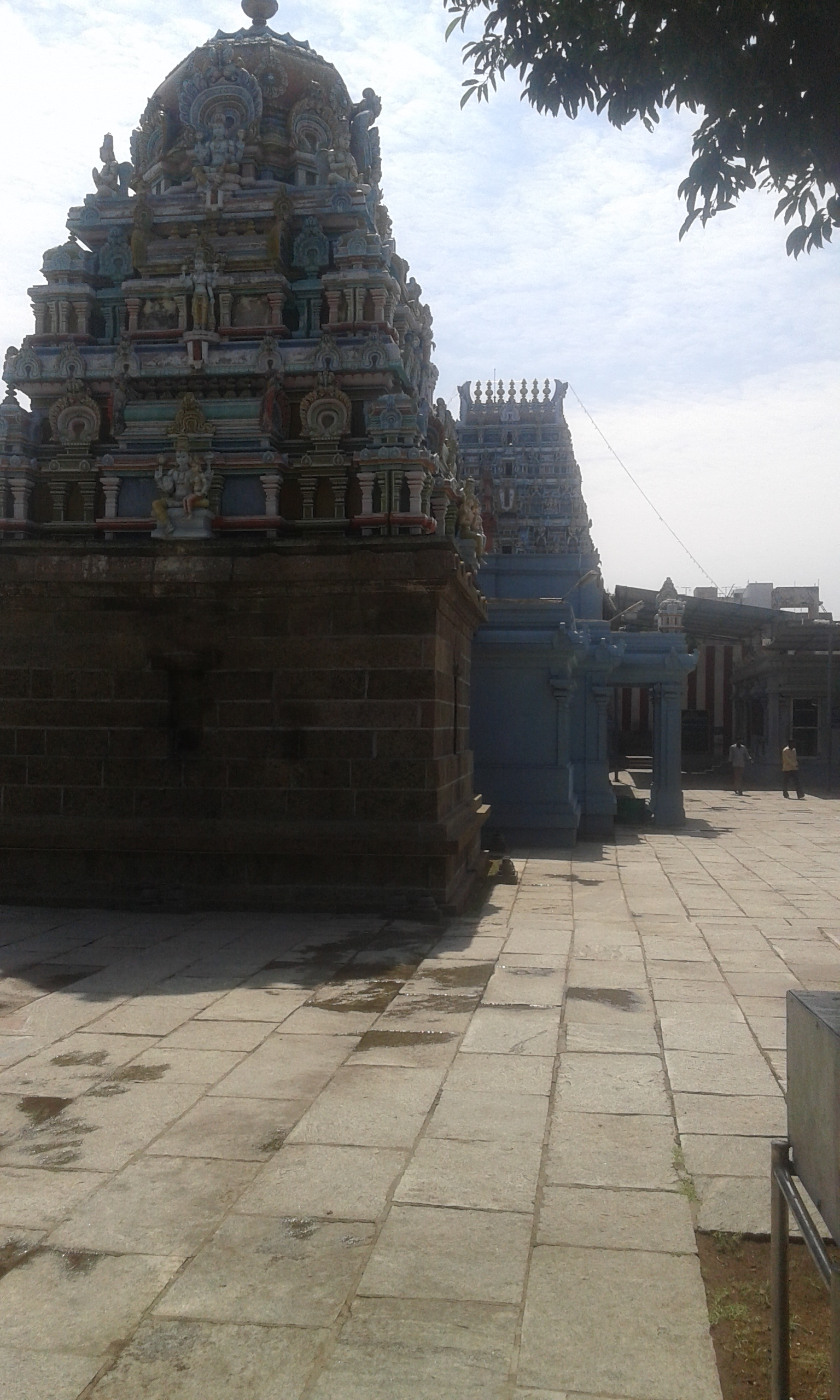

- Location in Tamil Nadu

Religion
- Affiliation: Hinduism
- District: Chennai
- Deity: Madhava Perumal (Vishnu) Amirtavalli (Lakshmi)

Location
- Location: Mylapore
- State: Tamil Nadu
- Country: India
- Coordinates: 13°2′16″N 80°16′17″E

Architecture
- Type: Dravidian architecture

The Madhava Perumal Temple is dedicated to Hindu deity Vishnu, located in Mylapore, Chennai, in the South Indian state of Tamil Nadu. Constructed in the Dravidian style of architecture, dedicated to Vishnu, who is worshipped as Madhava Perumal and his consort Lakshmi as Amirtavalli. The temple is believed to be the birthplace of Peyalvar, one of the first three of the twelve azhwars. The temple is maintained and administered by the Hindu Religious and Endowment Board of the Government of Tamil Nadu.

== Legend ==
In Hindu mythology, during the churning of the ocean of milk, Vishnu is believed to have instructed his consort Lakshmi to reach the hermitage of Sage Bhrigu. The sage was engaged in a penance to gain a daughter, and accepted the girl Lakshmi. The presiding deity, Madhava Perumal, is believed to have married goddess Amritavalli, the daughter of sage Bhrigu, and thus gained the epithet 'Kalyana Perumal' (The great wedding deity).

The temple is believed to be the birthplace of Peyalvar, one of the first three of the twelve Alvar saints of the 6th-9th century CE. The renowned Alvar was believed to have come to earth from the 60 ft (18 m) well called Manikairavam inside the temple premises. In the contemporary period, the temple is maintained and administered by the Hindu Religious and Charitable Endowments Department of the Government of Tamil Nadu.

== The temple ==
The temple is built in Dravidian architecture and has two precincts. It is in Mylapore, a suburb in Chennai, the capital of the Indian state of Tamil Nadu. The temple has a rectangular plan surrounded by 10 ft (3.0 m) high walls, pierced by a 5-tier gopuram, the gateway tower. The presiding deity is a granite image housed in the sanctum. It is seated with images of Lakshmi and Bhumi on either side. There is a small shrine for Varaha, an avatar of Vishnu, behind the central shrine.

== Worship practices and festivals ==
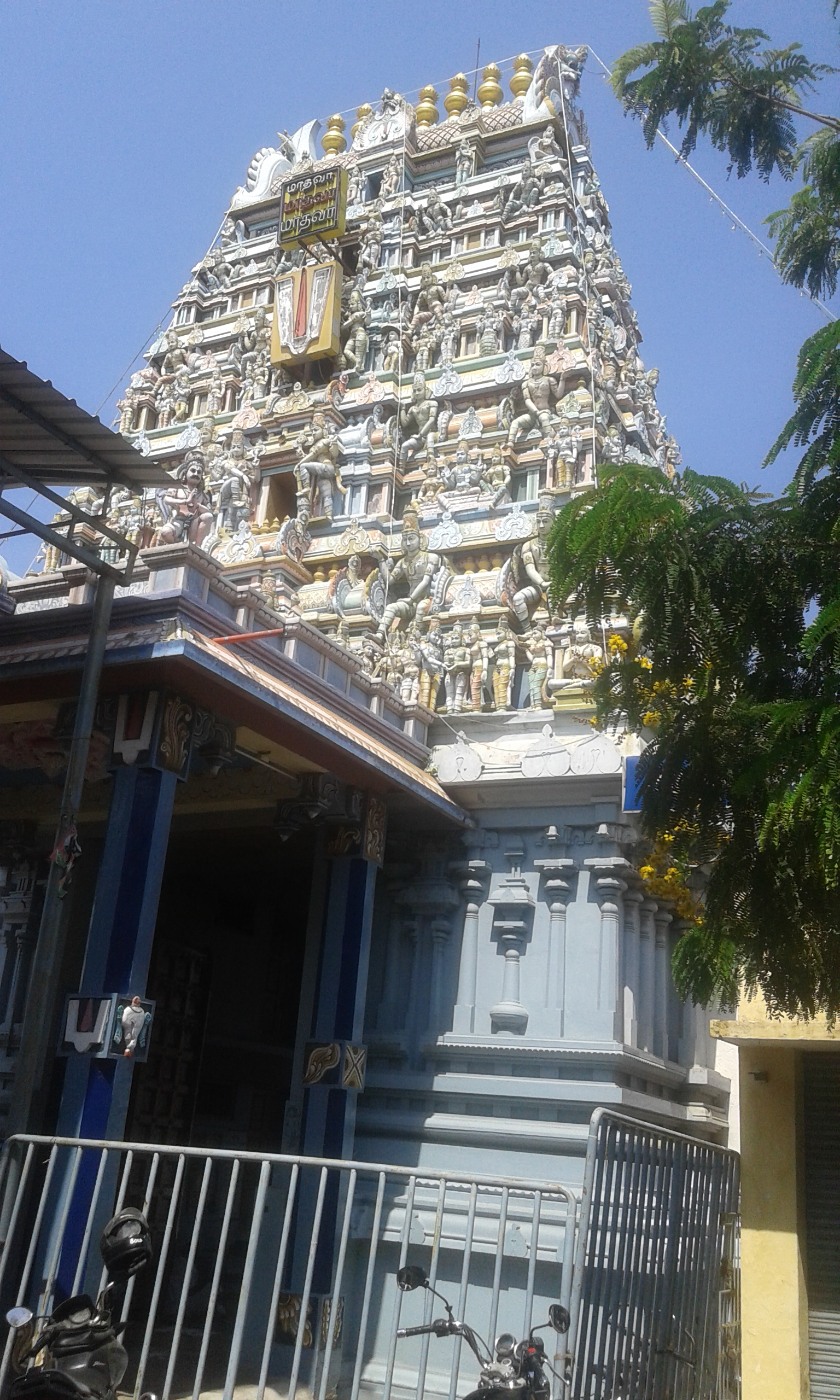
Image of the gateway tower, the gopuram

During the Magam day of the Tamil month Maasi, the festival deity of Madhava Perumal is taken in a float in temple tank. During the subsequent days, the festival deities of Peyalvar is taken in the float. The festival is one of the major festivals of the temple, which was not celebrated for a decade before 2011. It is believed that all the rivers converge in the tank during the auspicious day. The annual festival, Brahmostavam, of the temple is celebrated during the Tamil month of Chittirai (March - April).

== See also ==
- Heritage structures in Chennai
- Religion in Chennai
