= Sri Varadharaja Perumal Kovil =

Hindu temple in India

Coordinates: 8.6778656°N 77.678494°E

Sri Varadharaja Perumal Kovil and Mahalakshmi Thayar

Religion
- Affiliation: Hinduism
- Deity: Sri Varadharaja Perumal

Location
- Location: Tirunelveli
- State: Tamil Nadu
- Country: India
- Interactive map of Sri Varadharaja Perumal Kovil and Mahalakshmi Thayar

Architecture
- Type: Kovil
- Completed: unknown (it existed in some form for the last 400 years)

The Sri Varadharaja Perumal Temple in Tirunelveli, Tamil Nadu, India is a Hindu temple dedicated to Vishnu.

It is on the banks of the Thamirabarani River.
