= Varadaraja Perumal Temple, Shoolagiri =

Varadaraja Perumal Temple
- Varadharaja Perumal Temple, Shoolagiri, Krishnagiri, Tamil Nadu

Religion
- Affiliation: Hinduism
- District: Krishnagiri
- Deity: Prasanna Varadaraja Perumal (Vishnu); Perundevi Mahalakshmi(Lakshmi)

Location
- Location: Shoolagiri
- State: Tamil Nadu
- Country: India
- Interactive map of Varadaraja Perumal Temple
- Coordinates: 12.6647°N 78.0175°E

Architecture
- Creator: Arjuna, later Chola Kings, Krishnadeva raya, Hoysalas, Palayakkars and Vijayanagara rulers
- Completed: Dvapara Yuga
- Elevation: 748.06 m (2,454 ft)

Website
- http://srivaradarajaperumaltemple.wordpress.com

The Varadaraja Perumal Temple in Shoolagiri, Tamil Nadu India is a Hindu temple dedicated to Lord Vishnu.

== Temple ==
The Varadaraja Perumal Temple is located in Shoolagiri in Krishnagiri District, Tamil Nadu. This temple is an ancient and reputed Vishnu temple. This temple has been constructed by many kings over a period of time. Arjuna consecrated this temple during the exile period in Mahabharata time. The garbhagraha of this temple was built by Chola kings. The front hall (mantapam) was constructed by Krishnadeva Raya of Vijayanagara empire. Later, Hoysala kings, Palayakarars and Vijayanagara empire's small kings expanded this temple gradually and worshiped.

== Legend ==
In Dvapara Yuga, when Pancha Pandavas lost in the gambling to Duryodhana, they were condemned to exile in the forest, as per the terms of the gambling. During the exile period, pancha pandavas went to many places and came to Shoolagiri as well. In Shoolagiri, Arjuna consecrated Varadaraja Perumal and worshipped Him. As a mark of the arrival of Pancha Pandavas to this place, there are 5 big rocks together in the Shoolagiri hill. As the Shoolagiri hill resembles trident (Shoolam in Tamil), this place got the name as 'Shoolagiri' over the period of time.

== Speciality ==
Varadaraja Perumal faces west in this temple. Mother Perundevi Mahalakshmi faces east in a separate sanctum. Every year during the Utharanyana period (mid January to mid July), the sun rays will fall on the feet of Lord Varadaraja Perumal during sun set.

== Festival ==
Every year on 21 May, Varadaraja Perumal jayanthi will be celebrated with special poojas, homams and kalaynotsavam to Varadaraj Perumal and Thayaar Perundevi Mahalakshmi Devi.

Garuda Seva will happen during Vaikunta Ekadasi and also in Margazhi Tamil month (mid December – mid January). This temple has the biggest Garuda vahanam, compared to all the temples in the nearby areas.
