= Demographics of Tiruchirappalli =

Tiruchirappalli is a city in the Indian state of Tamil Nadu. It is the fourth most populous city and is the densest regional urban area in the state. According to the 2001 census, Tiruchirappalli had a population of 752,066 with in the city limits and an extended urban agglomeration population of 866,354. According to the 2011 census, Tiruchirappalli had a population of 847,387 within the city limits The city's sex ratio of 1025 is among the best for any city in India which has a population of one million or more.

The most widely spoken language is Tamil followed by Telugu, Saurashtra and Kannada.

== History of enumeration ==
Historical population
Year	Pop.	±%
1871	76,530	—
1881	84,449	+10.3%
1891	90,609	+7.3%
1901	104,721	+15.6%
1911	123,512	+17.9%
1921	120,422	−2.5%
1931	142,843	+18.6%
1941	159,566	+11.7%
1951	218,921	+37.2%
1961	249,862	+14.1%
1971	307,400	+23.0%
1981	362,045	+17.8%
1991	387,223	+7.0%
2001	752,066	+94.2%
2011	847,387	+12.7%
Sources: 1871 – 1901: 1891 – 1941: 1941 – 1961: 1961–1991: 1991–2001: 2011:^{b}

According to the 1871 Indian census, the first in British India, Tiruchirappalli had a population of 76,530 making it the second largest city in Madras Presidency, next only to the capital city of Madras. The population grew further by 10.3% and 7.3% over the next two decades respectively, thus reaching 0.1 million in 1901. Tiruchirappalli along with Madras and Madurai were the three cities with a population of 0.1 million or more at the time. The city experienced a negative growth rate during the decade 1911–21. After that it grew steadily and attained a growth rate of 37.2% during 1941–51. During the 1970s, it fell behind other cities such as Madurai and Coimbatore. As of 2011, it is the fourth largest city in Tamil Nadu after Chennai, Coimbatore and Madurai. The concept of urban agglomeration (UA) was introduced in the 1991 census. The UA had a population of 711,862. After the city was made a Municipal corporation in 1994 by annexing Srirangam and Golden Rock municipalities, its population almost doubled in 2001.

== Religions ==
Religions in Tiruchirappalli city (2011)
Religion	Percent
Hinduism	74.07%
Islam	14.72%
Christianity	10.89%
Other or not stated	0.32%

The majority of the population, nearly three-quarters of Tiruchirappalli, follow Hinduism. There is a considerable population that follow Islam and Christianity. Sikhs and Jains also form a small amount of the total population.

Tiruchirappalli, being on the Kaveri, is a site particularly sacred to Hindus. On the island of Srirangam, one of the three islands in the middle of the Kaveri, is the Ranganathaswamy Temple, one of the largest in the world. For Sri Vaishnavites, this temple forms one of three places where particularly important Ranganathaswamy Temples are found: Adi Ranga in Srirangapatna, Madhya Ranga at Shivanasamudra and Antya Ranga in Srirangam. All three are islands in the Kaveri River, but Srirangam is the only one in Tamil Nadu.

Islam has a long history in the city. According to legend, a Sufi saint named Nathar Shah came to the city from Anatolia, and his urs is still celebrated by people of all religions. Tiruchirappalli was briefly ruled by the Nawabs of Arcot, and they built several mosques in the city.

Roman Catholics in Tiruchirappalli are affiliated to the Roman Catholic Diocese of Tiruchirapalli while Protestants are affiliated to the Trichy–Tanjore Diocese of the Church of South India. Our Lady of Lourdes church is a large Catholic church in the city that is over a century old. As a separate division of the Southern Railway is headquartered at Tiruchirappalli city, there is a considerably strong Anglo-Indian population in the city. Christianity in this region of Tamil Nadu has a history of over 3 centuries, with the first Catholic mission being sent in the mid 17th century with the patronage of the Madurai Nayakas who then ruled the city.

== Languages ==
Languages of Tiruchirappalli (2011)
1. Tamil (91.7%)
2. Urdu (2.97%)
3. Telugu (2.84%)
4. Others (2.49%)

Tamil, the official language of the state is the most commonly used language, followed by Urdu, Telugu, Saurashtra and Kannada Unlike other regions of Tamil Nadu, the people of Tiruchirappalli follow the standard dialect of Tamil, the Central Tamil dialect. Saurashtra is the mother tongue of the Saurashtrians who migrated from southern Gujarat to South India in 14th century AD. There is also a substantial population of Sri Lankan Tamil migrants, most of whom are housed in refugee camps on the outskirts of the city.

== Notes ==
- R. Burn; J. S. Cotton, eds. (1908). Imperial Gazetteer of India. Vol. 24. Clarendon Press.
- Manorama Yearbook 2007. Malayala Manorama. 2007.
- Census Commissioner (1941). Census of India, 1941: Vol 2. Government of India.
- Chockalingam, K. (1979). Census of India, 1971: Tamil Nadu. Government of India.
- Rural Urban Relationship Committee, India (1966). Report. Vol. 3. Govt.of India, Ministry of Health & Family Planning.
- Rajendran, S.; Arumugam, M.; Chandrasekaran, V. A. (2002). Potential Use of High Resolution IRS 1-C Satellite Data and Deletion of Urban Growth in and around of Tiruchirapalli city (PDF). Federation Internationale des Geometres.
- Sen, Ajoy Kumar (1991). Tourism in India. Modern Book Agency.
- Palanithurai, Ganapathy (2007). A handbook for panchayati raj administration (Tamil Nadu). Concept Publishing Company. ISBN 978-81-8069-340-3. ISBN 978-81-8069-340-3.
- Francis, W. (1989). Gazetteer of South India. Mittal Publications. GGKEY:4Y158YFPNGZ.
- Ramappa, M.; Singh, Sudershan (1984). Directory of Telugu associations outside Andhra Pradesh. International Telugu Institute.
- Muthanna, I. M. (1962). History of Karnataka: History, Administration & Culture. Usha Press.
- Hunter, Sir William Wilson (1908). Imperial Gazetteer of India. Clarendon Press.
- Thurston, Edgar (1913). Provincial Geographies of India Vol 4: The Madras Presidency with Mysore, Coorg and Associated States. Cambridge University. p. 123.
- Agesthialingom, S.; Gowda, K. Kushalappa (1976). Dravidian case system. Vol. 1. Annamalai University.
- Johnson, Basil Leonard Clyde (1 June 2001). Geographical dictionary of India. Vision Books. ISBN 978-81-7094-428-7.
- Deefholts, Glenn; Acharya, Quentine (2006). The way we were: Anglo-Indian chronicles. Calcutta Tiljallah Relief Inc. ISBN 0975463934. ISBN 978-0-9754639-3-2.
