= Pancharanga Kshetrams =

Group of five Vishnu temples in South India

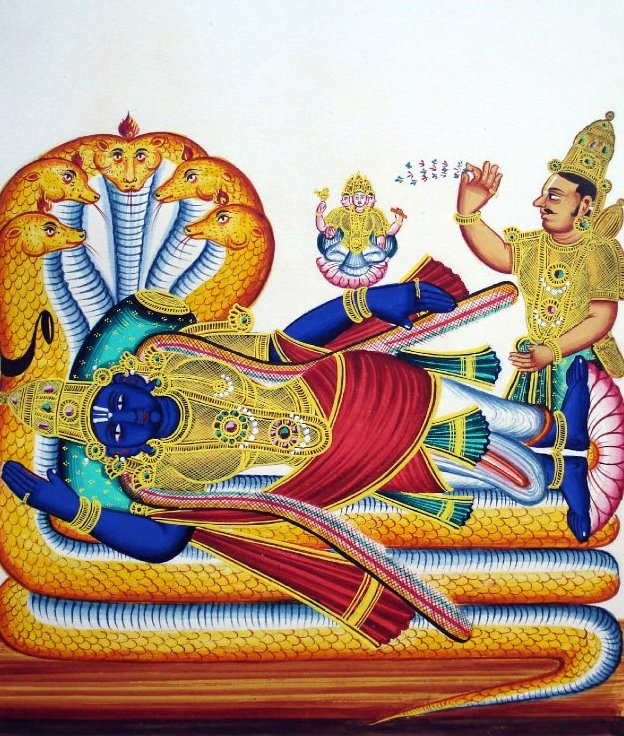
Artistic representation of the deity Ranganatha.

The Pancharanga Kshetrams (Sanskrit: पञ्चरङ्ग क्षेत्रम्, romanized: Pañcaraṅga Kṣetram, lit. 'Five abodes/stages of Ranganatha') or Pancharangams is a group of five sacred Hindu temples, dedicated to Ranganatha, a form of the deity Vishnu, on the banks of the Kaveri River. The five Pancharanga Kshetrams in the order of their successive locations, on the banks of the Kaveri River are:

- The Srirangapatna called the Adi Rangam, the first temple on the banks of the Kaveri River from the upstream side;
- The Shivanasamudra called The Madhya Ranga, Karnataka,
- The Srirangam (island in Tiruchirappalli) in Tamil Nadu known as Kasthuri Rangam or Anthya Rangam (the last temple),
- Appalarangam or Koviladi at Tiruppernagar in Tamil Nadu, Parimala Ranganatha Perumal Temple at Tiruindalur in Mayiladuthurai or Mayuram and Vatarangam near Sirkazhi, also listed as Sri Renganatha Perumal Temple, Vadarengam, Tamil Nadu, 609108.
- The Sarangapani temple at Kumbakonam is mentioned in place of Vatarangam in some references.
Temple locations

== Sri Ranganatha Temple, Srirangapatna ==
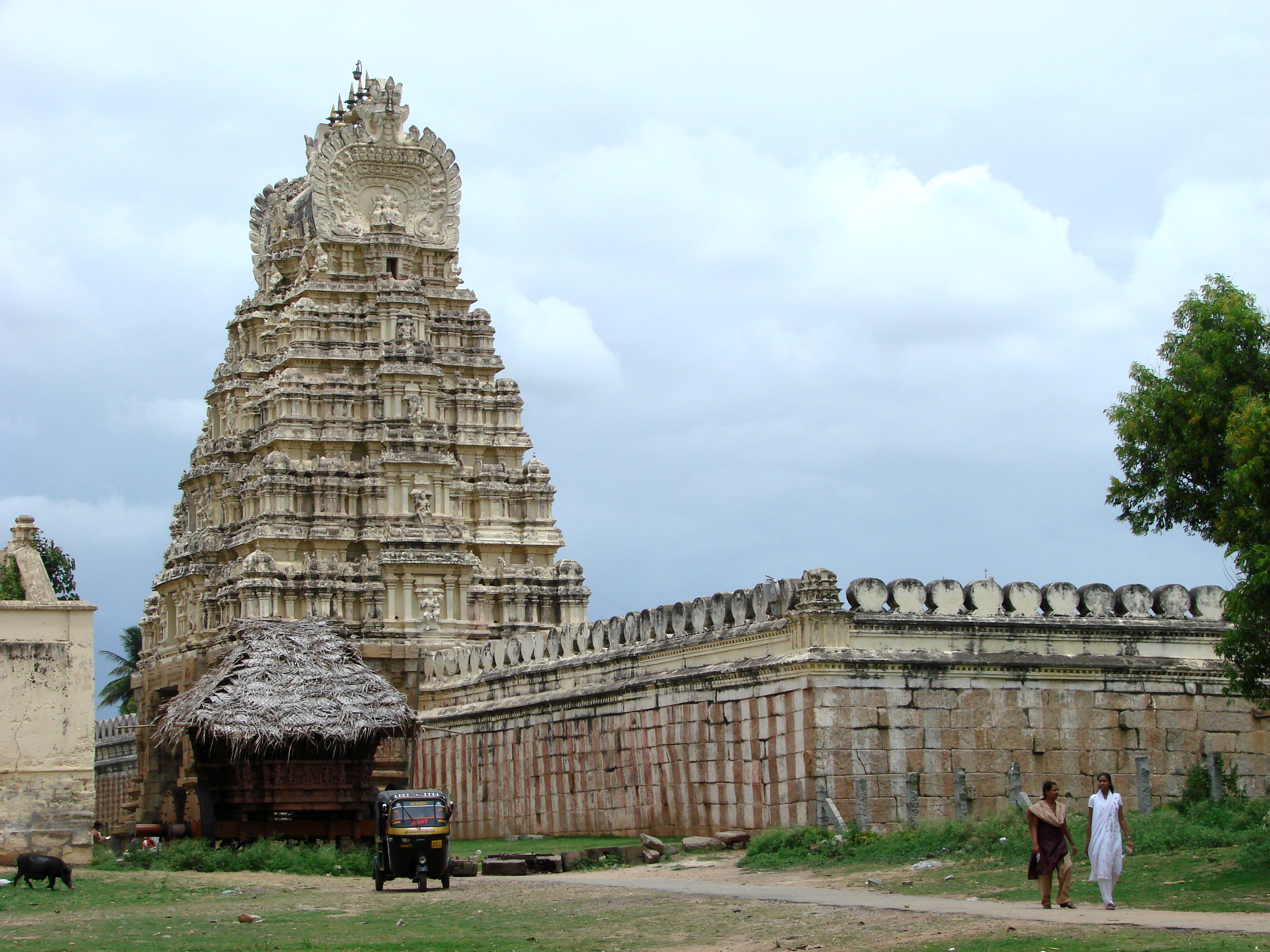
The temple of Ranganatha in Srirangapatna

Also known as Adiranga, the temple is located on the banks of the Kaveri in Srirangapatna, Karnataka. This temple originally built in 894 CE by Tirumaliah of the Ganga Dynasty and legend accounts its founding to Sage Gautama. The temple was expanded by the Hoysalas in the 11th century CE and subsequently by Vijayanagara kings. Ranganatha, the presiding deity of this temple, was honoured by the Muslim ruler Tipu Sultan.

A Nayaka ruler who ruled over Srirangapatna built the fort there and also expanded the Sri Ranganatha Temple complex with the treasures he found there. His descendants ruled until 1495, when Srirangapatna was taken over by Vijayanagar Empire. One of the largest temples in Karnataka, it was built in three stages: the innermost part of the temple is said to date back to the Hoysala period; the Gopuram was built in the Vijaynagara architectural style, and has six storeys, colourfully plastered and adorned with idols; and the main idol in the temple of Ranganatha is reclining on a five-headed serpent and is said to be very ancient. According to the local legend, it is said to be 3600 years old and was a gift from God. There is a chariot located in the front yard of this temple which was a gift by Muslim Ruler Hyder Ali, Tipu Sultan's father.

This temple is known as the eastern (Purva) Ranganatha Kshetram, while the similar temple in the western part of the Cauvery River, also in an island is called the Paschima Ranganatha Kshetra.

The temple is 16 kilometres (9.9 mi) from the Mysore city in the town of Srirangaptna, which is named after the deity, Sri Ranganatha in the temple. The annual Ranganatha Swamy temple fair is held at the temple premises in the month of Pausha (December/January).

== Sri Ranganathaswamy Temple (Srirangam) ==
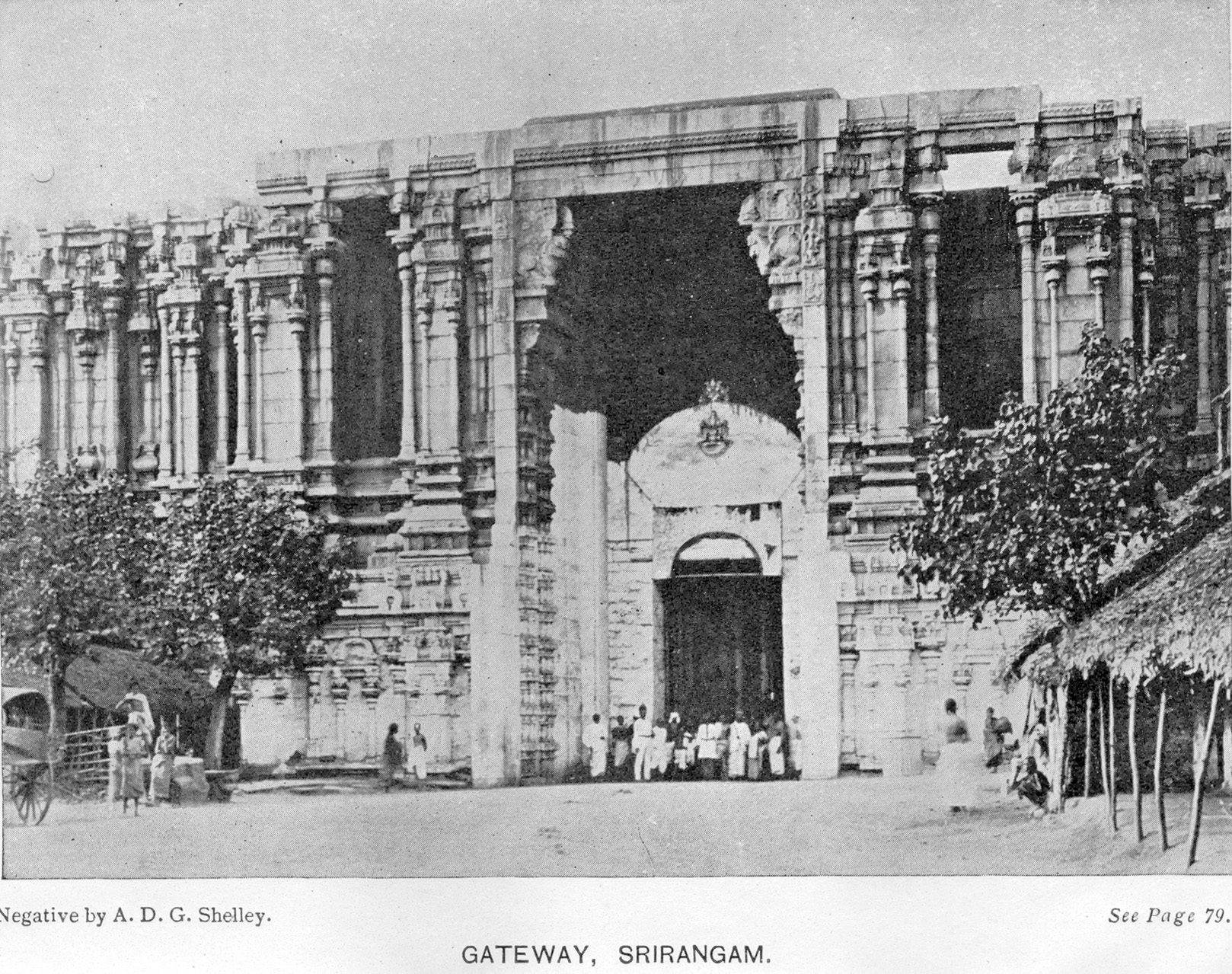
Pre 1987

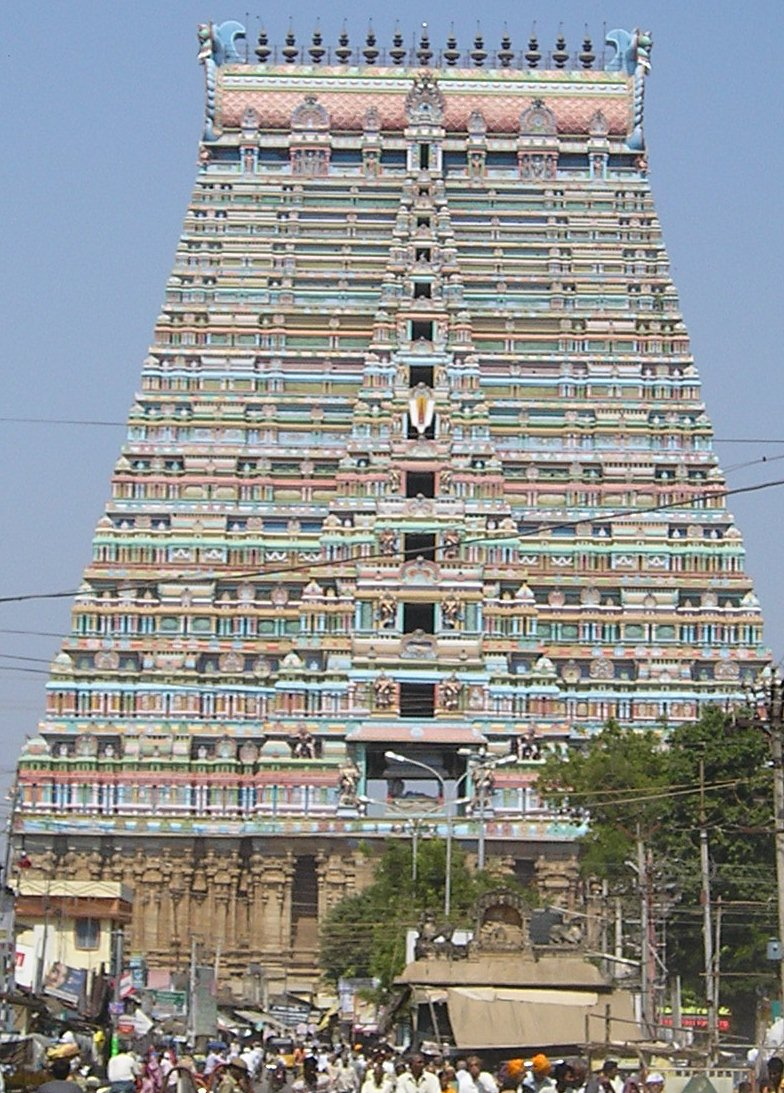
Post 1987

Rajagopuram (Main tower)

Sri Ranganathaswamy Temple is located on the eastern shores of the Srirangam (Anthya Ranga) island, which appears like a conch in shape, one of the adornments in Vishnu's hands. In this temple, Ranganatha in a reclining position resting on the bed of Shesha and is seen with his consort Ranganayaki. There are many legends connected with the founding of the temple but the most narrated one is that the creator god Brahma was involved in doing tapas (meditation) here when the central icon of Ranganatha emerged from the cosmic milky ocean in a celestial flying craft. Brahma then took this image to his abode Satyaloka in the heavens where he offered daily puja. This was then brought to Ayodhya by King Ikshvaku after several hundred years of penance, and was passed down over generations to Ikshvaku's descendant Rama, an avatar of Vishnu himself and hero of the epic Ramayana. Rama then presented it to Vibhishana, who assisted him in killing the demon-king of Lanka and Vibhishana's elder brother, Ravana. However, when Vibhishana was taking the image to Lanka, he stopped en route on the banks of the Kaveri to bathe at Srirangam, and thereafter the deity wished to dwell there itself, and since then it is under continuous worship at this location. Since Vibhishana was very forlorn by the decision of the Lord, Ranganatha faces south towards Lanka to placate Vibhishana. One more legend mentioned is that river goddess Kaveri requested Ranganatha to reside at Srirangam.

The temple is also known for the legend of Andal, a female Alvar saint of the Sri Vaishnava sect. She got married symbolically to the Ranganatha icon (Vishnu) as per her deep desire. The marriage took place in the sanctum sanctorum of the temple when Andal (said to be an incarnation of goddess Lakshmi) merged with the image, and became a part of Ranganatha.

Another incident related to the deity of this temple is of a Vaishnava Saint (Vipra Narayanar) who lived in the 7th century and composed hymns in praise of the Lord. He was born in a village called Thirumandangudi on the banks of the Kaveri River and was a staunch devotee of Ranganatha of Srirnagam. He came to live in Srirangam and used to make garlands for the deity. However, he fell in love with a devadasi and he took to wrong deeds. Finally, Lord Ranganatha came to his rescue and then he was given the name of Thondaradippodi Alvar, (meaning: "dust at the feet of the lord"). Thereafter, he composed 54 hymns in praise of the Lord, which have become part of Naalayira Divya Prabhandam (4000 divine hymns).

The temple location is in an island formed by the Kaveri River and the stream Kollidam joining it, to bifurcate it and again joining a few miles downstream of the island. Its construction, in Dravidian architectural style, is attributed to the period of Udayan Setupathi in association with Sri Lankan prince Pararaja Sekara, in 1414; however, the main sanctuary where the idol is deified dates to the 11th century and the surrounding enclosures and pavilions belong mostly to the 17th and 18th centuries. It took 350 years to complete with 35 villages granted for its maintenance. The sanctum sanctorum, square in shape, built with in circular shrine, is encircled by seven tier of walls of 25 feet (7.6 m) height) spaced at 120 yards (110 m), with outer wall measuring nearly 7 miles (11 km). There are twenty one towers or "gopurams" (some of them unfinished) and each forming a common gated entry and all of similar design; the 13- tiered rajagopuram, or chief tower, on the western side, 78 feet (24 m) in height (illustration), was built in 1987 by Ahobila Mutt and dominates the landscape for miles around. There are many pavilions and shrines within the complex an Ayiram kaal mandapam (a hall of 1000 pillars of carved granite and decorated with carvings) and several small water tanks (two important ones for pilgrims to bathe are Agni Thirta and Kodi Tirtha) inside. The corridors and pillars are huge and elegantly carved. The corridors are about 400 feet (120 m) in length with width varying from 17–21 feet (5.2–6.4 m) with a height of 30 feet (9.1 m) from the floor to the ceiling. The total area covered by the temple precincts measures 865 feet (264 m)x657 feet (200 m). Red and gray granite and sienite have been used in pavements, stairways and lower part of walls. The temple has decorations of carved griffins, idols of gods and men and animals (tigers). The space between the walls of the temple complex has the well planned complete city of Srirangam with roads and houses. It is stated to be the largest temple in South India.

Vaikunta Ekadashi festival is an important event in the temple premises and is said to be a celebration on the occasion of Ekadashi goddess who is said to have defeated asuras or demons.

Parasara Batttar, well known poet of the times who has written a commentary on Vishnu Sahasranama (the thousand names of Vishnu) has noted the beautiful image of Ranganatha at Srirangam temple as ornamented with basil (tulsi) garland on the chest (favorite of Vishnu), Kaustubha, Vaijayanthi hara (a necklace) and a few other ornaments, which once formed the divine jewelry of Krishna, the avatar (incarnation) of Vishnu, are also decorating the image of Ranganatha.

== Sri Appakkudathaan Perumal Temple ==
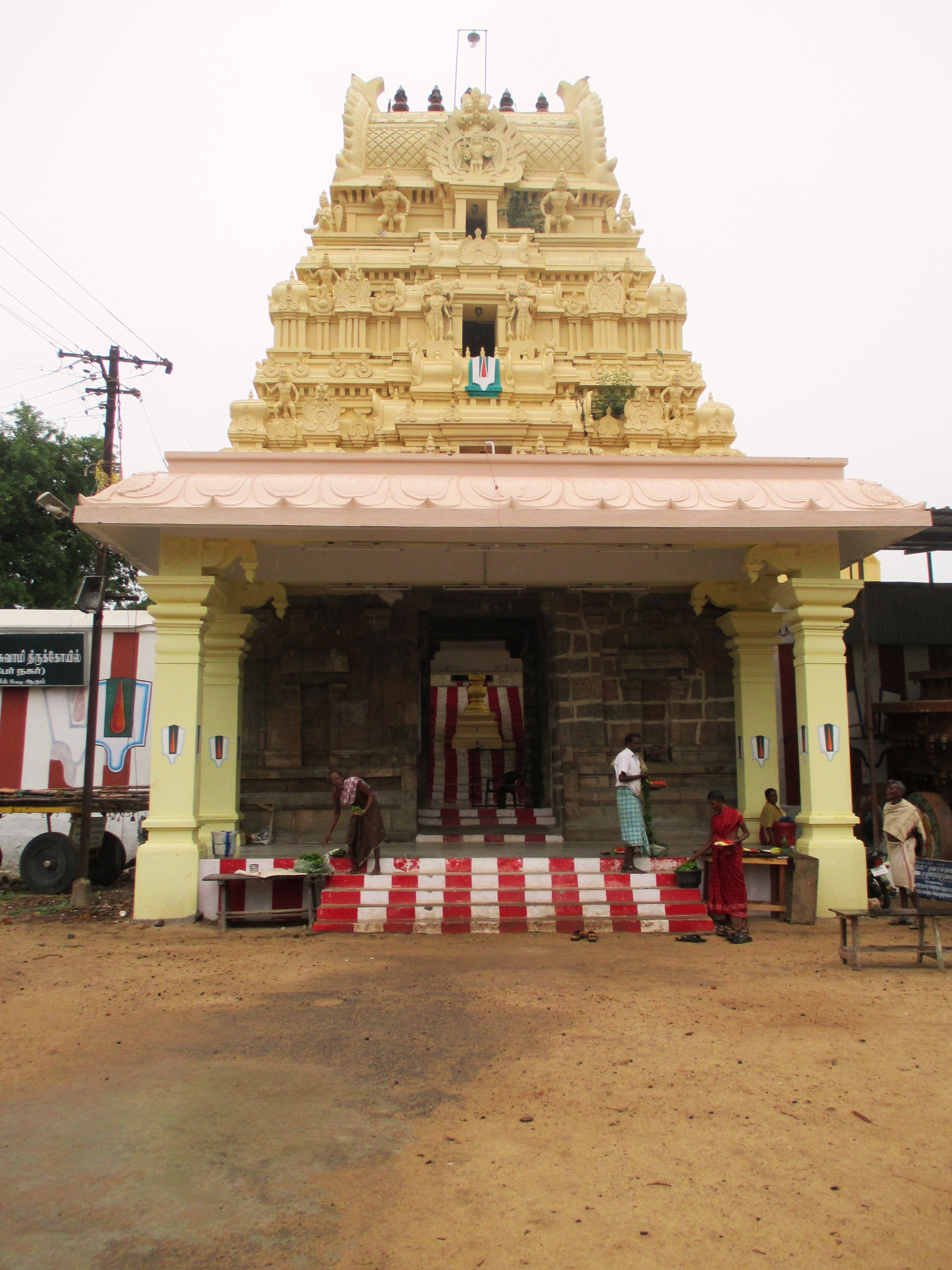
Koviladi Appala Ranganathar temple

The Sri Appakkudathaan Perumal Temple, also called as Thirupper Nagar, is located on the banks of the Kaveri River, 3 miles (4.8 km) away from Kollidam. It is one of the 108 Divya Desams and also one of the Pancharanga Kshetrams.

The main deity in the sanctum is Lord Ranganatha, in a reclining pose and considered adi, meaning fore runner, to the Sri Ranganatha Swamy Temple at Srirangam. The temple tower is in the shape of Indira's Vimana (aircraft). Also seen in the precincts of the temple is the shrine of Lord Vazhikatti Vinanayaka (Guiding Vinayaka) or Lord Ganesh. According to the legend of the place, King Upamanyu and Parasara Rishi saw the Lord Appakudathan here, and King Upamanyu is stated to have offered appam (pancake) as a food offering to the god, and hence the lord got his name as Appakudathan. Indra's pride was destroyed by this god and also removed the fear of death from the mind of Markandeya Rishi and also King Upari Siravasu was blessed free of sins and curses. Saint Periyalvar sang the Mangalashasanam, a hymn in praise of the Lord, in front of the god before he attained moksha or salvation.

== Sarangapani Temple ==
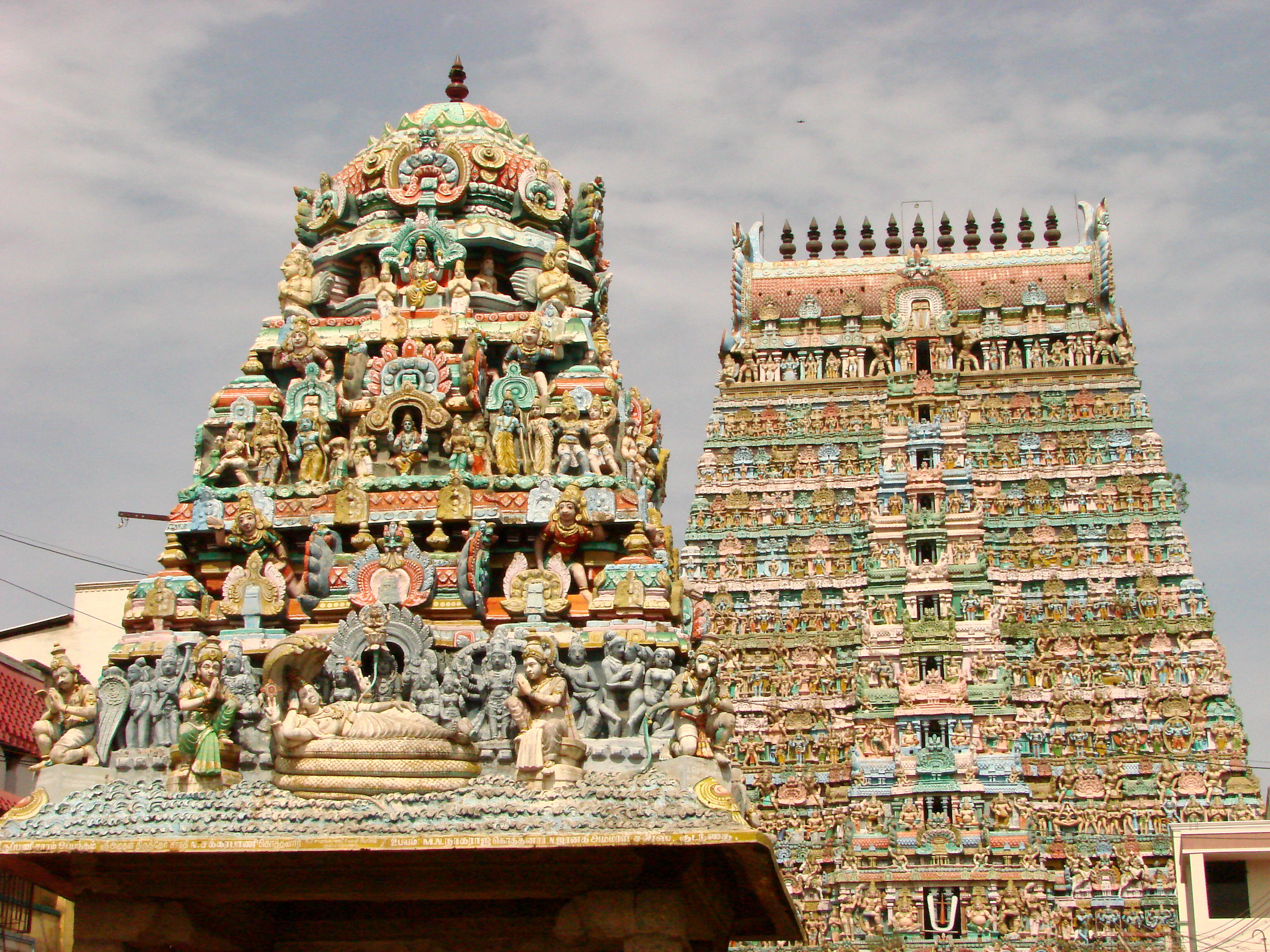
Gopuras of the temple in Kumbakonam

The Sarangapani Temple on the banks of the Kaveri River at Kumbakonam is one of the Divya Desams and is also one of the five Pancharangam Temples. Its location is in the Tanjore district of Tamil Nadu, India, about 1.5 miles (2.4 km) from the Kumbakonam railway station.

The deity in the temple is Sarangapani, an incarnation of Vishnu. According to a legend, when saint Hema Rishi did penance, Vishnu appeared to him from Heavens driving a chariot drawn by four horses and elephants. The temple depicts this scene in the sanctum sanctorum (central chamber of the temple) and the chariot opens out on either side. According to this legend the hermitage of the rishi became the Pottramarai tank of the temple.

== Parimala Ranganatha Perumal Temple ==
The Parimala Ranganatha Perumal Temple is also one of the 108 Divya Desams. It is located on the banks of the Kaveri River, in Mayiladuthurai in Tamil Nadu. The legend of the temple is related to a pious bandit-turned-Alvar saint Parakal, known for his devotion to Ranganatha. Lord Vishnu transformed him by teaching the Narayana mantra or Ashtaksara (the eight syllabled) – "namo narayanaya", turning the robber into a saint who then starts singing the first verse of Peria Thirumozhi/ Peria Thirumoli (Vaadinen Vaadi). Then Lord Ranganatha agrees to permanently reside in his town Tirunakari as Parimala Perumal and Parakal built a temple for him and remained there permanently offering prayers to the god. The Temple town is now known as Thiruindaloor in Mayiladuthurai taluk of Mayiladuthurai district in Tamil Nadu.

The practice of playing nadasvaram (a wind musical instrument) at temples, though in vogue for centuries, did not have any sahityam or music based literature or lyrics to go with it. Then a beginning was made by renowned musicians who composed a rakti, a musical composition with 2 to 8 notes according to their skills and then played it in Parimala Ranganatha Temple. Thereafter, it became a popular rendition in the nadasvaram. The rakti (lyrics) played in the Parimala Ranganatha temple at Tiruvizhandur was made famous by Tiruvizhandur Subrahmanya Pillai and Kurainadu Natesa Pillai, who were among the reputed rakti players of an earlier generation. Sri Radhakrishna Pillai was also a well known player of this instrument in recent times.

== Sri Renganatha Perumal Temple, Vadarengam ==
The last place in this list is known as VadaRangam as it is situated north of all these places (Vada in Tamil means north) or as Vata Rangam as the temple was once located in a forest of banyan (vata in Sanskrit) trees. Though there are not many banyan trees in the area today, the single tree found near the temple lends credence to this view. There is also an ancient Shiva temple, Jambukeswara here. This place is considered to be as holy as Srirangam as the temples of Lords Ranganatha and Sri Jambukeswara are situated close to each other. However, both the temples are in a highly dilapidated condition now due to the ravages of nature and the fury of the floods in the Kollidam. The river was once flowing near the temples after taking a turn towards the north (Utharavauhini). A river that flows from the south to the north is considered to be particularly sacred. A major part of the village of Vatarangam was washed away by floods in the early years of the 20th century. Likely since then, the temple at Kumbakonam has become a more popular pancharanga sthalam.

This place was known as Punnagavana Kshetram in the Satya Yuga, as Thulasivanam in the Treta Yuga, Vagularanyam in the Dvapara Yuga and Vataranyam in the Kali Yuga. There are many legends associated with this temple. Ranganatha's Moolavar idol is very small when compared with those in other places, and hence it is known as Balarangam. Lord Jambukeswara, referred to as Jambunathar here, is worshiped in a separate shrine though not much is known about the sthalapuranam. The Goddess here is known as Akhilandeswari.

To reach this place one has to travel on the Chennai-Chidambaram road, pass through Coleroon and Sirkazhi and then branch off the main road and travel a distance of 12 km before reaching Vatarangam. It is situated between Sirkazhi and Vaitheeswarankoil.

== See also ==
- Divya Desams
- Nava Tirupati

== Bibliography ==
- Ayyar, P. V. Jagadisa (1982). South Indian Shrines: Illustrated. Asian Educational Services. ISBN 978-81-206-0151-2.
- Dalal, Roshen (2011). Hinduism: An Alphabetical Guide. Penguin Books India. pp. 339–. ISBN 978-0-14-341421-6.
- Raman, Srilata (2007). Self-surrender (prapatti) to God in Śrīvaiṣṇavism: Tamil Cats and Sanskrit Monkeys. Taylor & Francis. p. 44. ISBN 978-0-415-39185-6.
- Deshpande, Aruna (2005). India: A Divine Destination. Crest Publishing House. pp. 264–265, 363–64, and 374–75. ISBN 81-242-0556-6.
