= Parimala Ranganatha Perumal Temple =

Hindu temple dedicated to Vishnu in Thiruvilandur, Mayiladuthurai, India

Parimala Ranganathar Perumal Temple
- Thiruvilandur
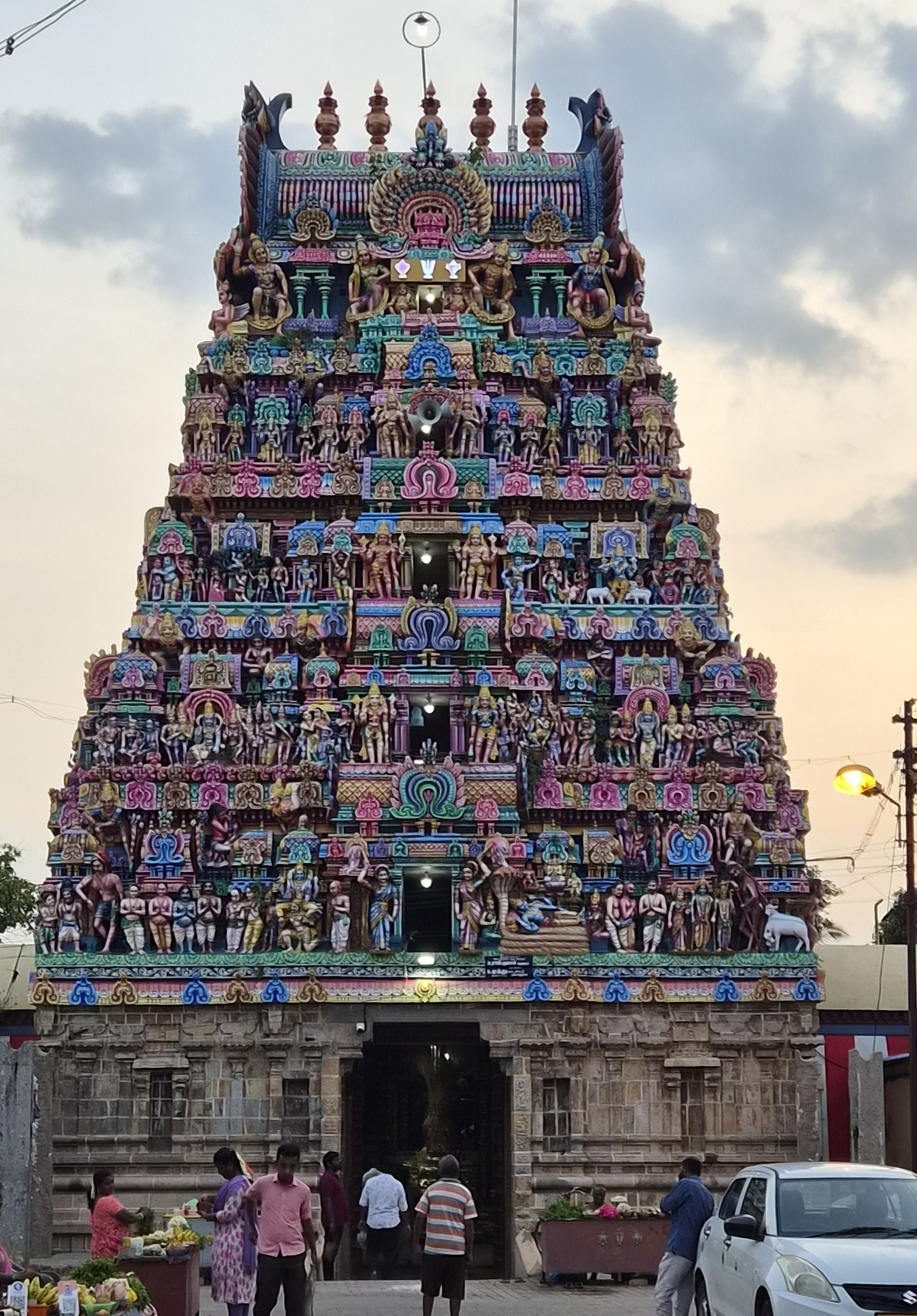

- Location in Tamil Nadu

Religion
- Affiliation: Hinduism
- District: Mayiladuthurai
- Deity: Parimala Ranganathar (Vishnu); Parimala Ranganayagi (Lakshmi)
- Features: Tower: Vedachakra

Location
- Location: Indaloor, Mayiladuthurai
- State: Tamil Nadu
- Country: India
- Coordinates: 11°6′35″N 79°38′46″E

Architecture
- Type: Dravidian architecture
- Temple: 1

Parimala Ranganathar Perumal Temples also known as Tiruindaloor Parimala Ranganathar Temple, is a Hindu temple dedicated to the deity Vishnu. It is located in Thiruvilandur, also known as Indalur, in the town of Mayiladuthurai in the South Indian state of Tamil Nadu. It is one of the Divya Desams, the 108 temples of Vishnu revered in Nalayira Divya Prabandham by the 12 poet saints, or the Alvars. This temple is along Kaveri and is one of the Pancharanga Kshetrams.

The temple is believed to be of significant antiquity with contributions at different times from Medieval Cholas, Vijayanagara Empire and Madurai Nayaks. The temple is enshrined within a granite wall and the complex contains all the shrines of the temple. The rajagopuram (the main gateway) has five tiers.

Parimala Ranganathar is believed to have appeared for Chandra, the moon god. The temple has six daily rituals at various times from 5:30 a.m. to 9 p.m., and twelve yearly festivals on its calendar. The temple is maintained and administered by the Hindu Religious and Chartibable Institutions Endowment Board of the Government of Tamil Nadu. The temple is one of the prominent tourist destinations in the district.

== Legend ==
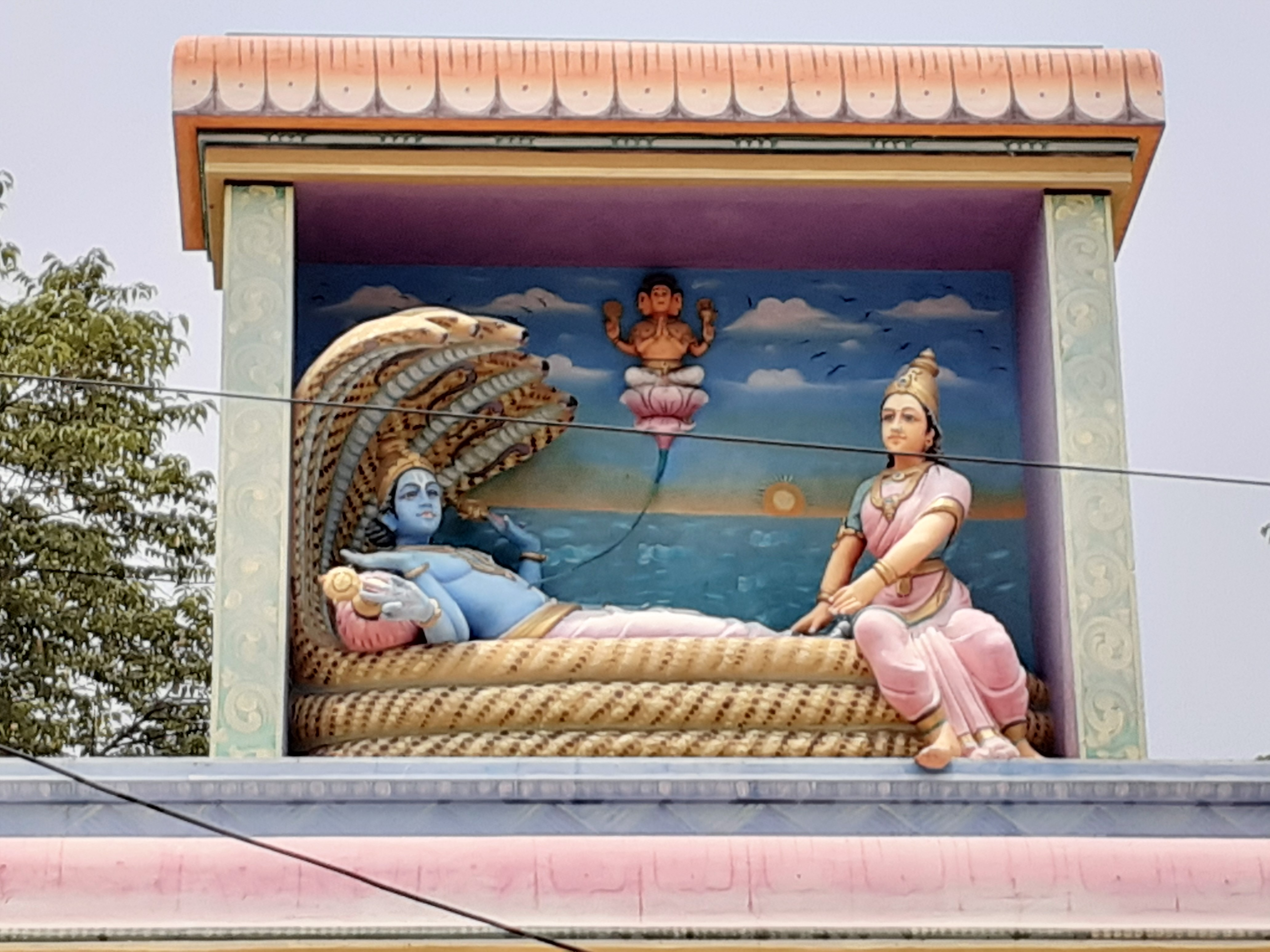
Legend of the temple

According to Hindu legend, the place is where moon god, Chandra is believed to have been relieved of his curse. Indu means moon and the place Tiruindaloor derives its name from the legend. Chandra worshiped Vishnu who appeared to please the devotee.

According to local Hindu tradition, the Vedas were once stolen from Brahma by the asuras, bringing Brahma’s creative activities to a halt. Brahma then appealed to Mahavishnu for help. In response, Mahavishnu defeated the asuras, recovered the Vedas, and returned them to Brahma. The tradition further relates that the Vedas had been affected by the impurity associated with their period in the possession of the asuras. To restore their purity and auspiciousness, Perumal of Indalur is believed to have bestowed a pleasant fragrance upon them through his grace. This association with fragrance is traditionally given as the reason for the deity’s name Parimala Ranganathan, with parimala referring to fragrance or pleasant scent.

According to another legend, the Alvar saint Thirumangai Alvar visited the temple and the doors were locked at the time. He was singing praise of Parimala Ranganathar, but the door still was not open. After continuous singing, he became frustrated at one point and so asked Parimala Ranganathar to keep the temple for himself, when the doors were opened.

== Architecture ==
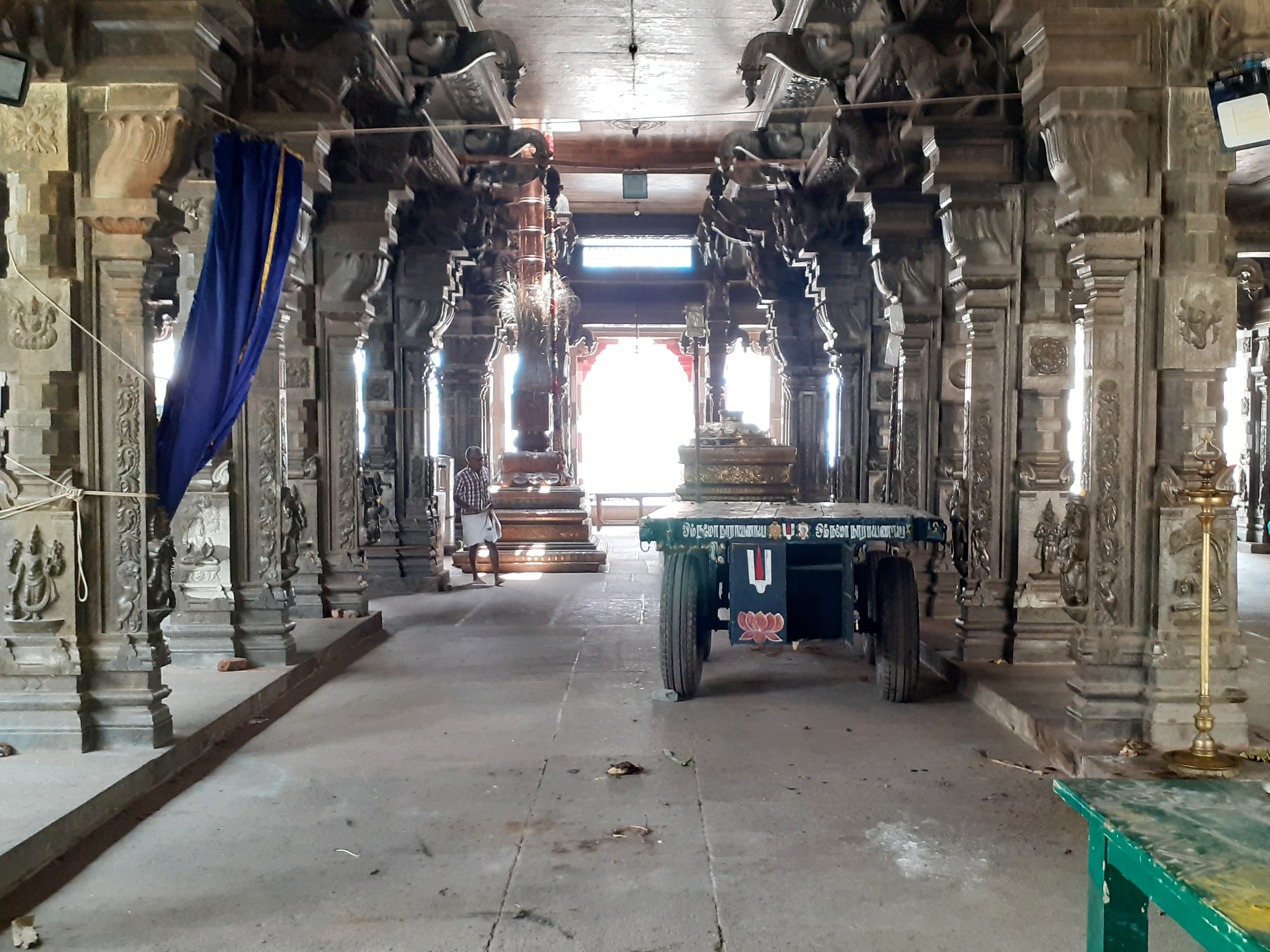
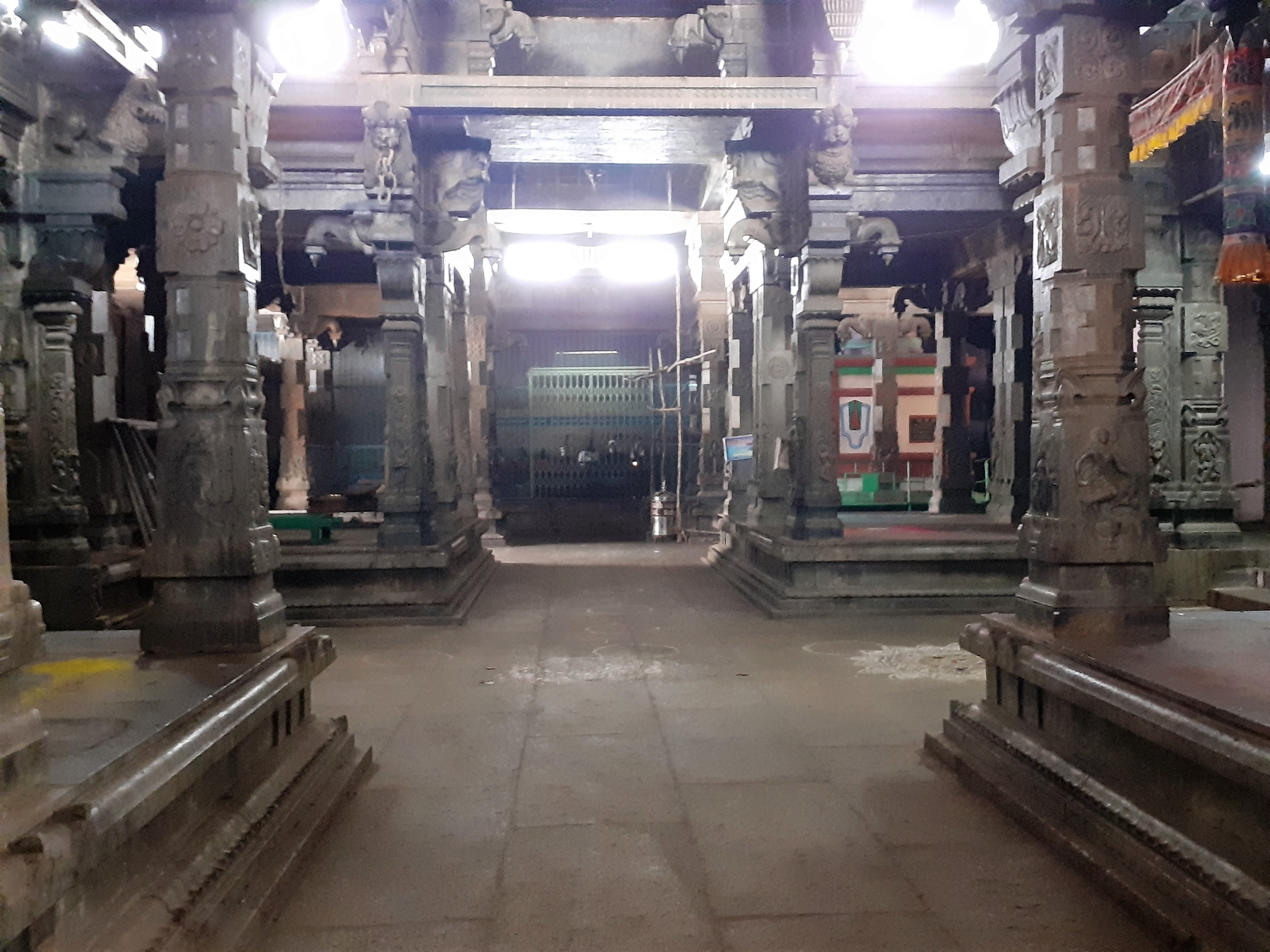
Pillared halls within the temple

The central shrine, of the presiding deity Parimala Ranganathar, is made of 12 ft (3.7 m) green stone. The deity is seen in a reclining posture, facing east. The consort of Parimala Ranganathar is Parimala Ranganayaki, who is also called Chandrasaapa Vimochanavalli and Pundareekavalli. The sanctum houses the images of river gods Cauvery and Ganga, as well as that of Santhanagopalakrishnan. The Hindu god of creation, Brahma, is sculpted on the wall. The temple has shrines of Yoga Narasimhar, Rama, Anjaneya, Suryam and Chandra. This temple has three prakarams (precincts) that house all the shrines and has a five-tier, east-facing Rajagopuram. The Dvajasthamba Mandapam and Garuda Mandapam have sculpted pillars, with the latter having images of ten avatars of Vishnu.

== Religious significance ==
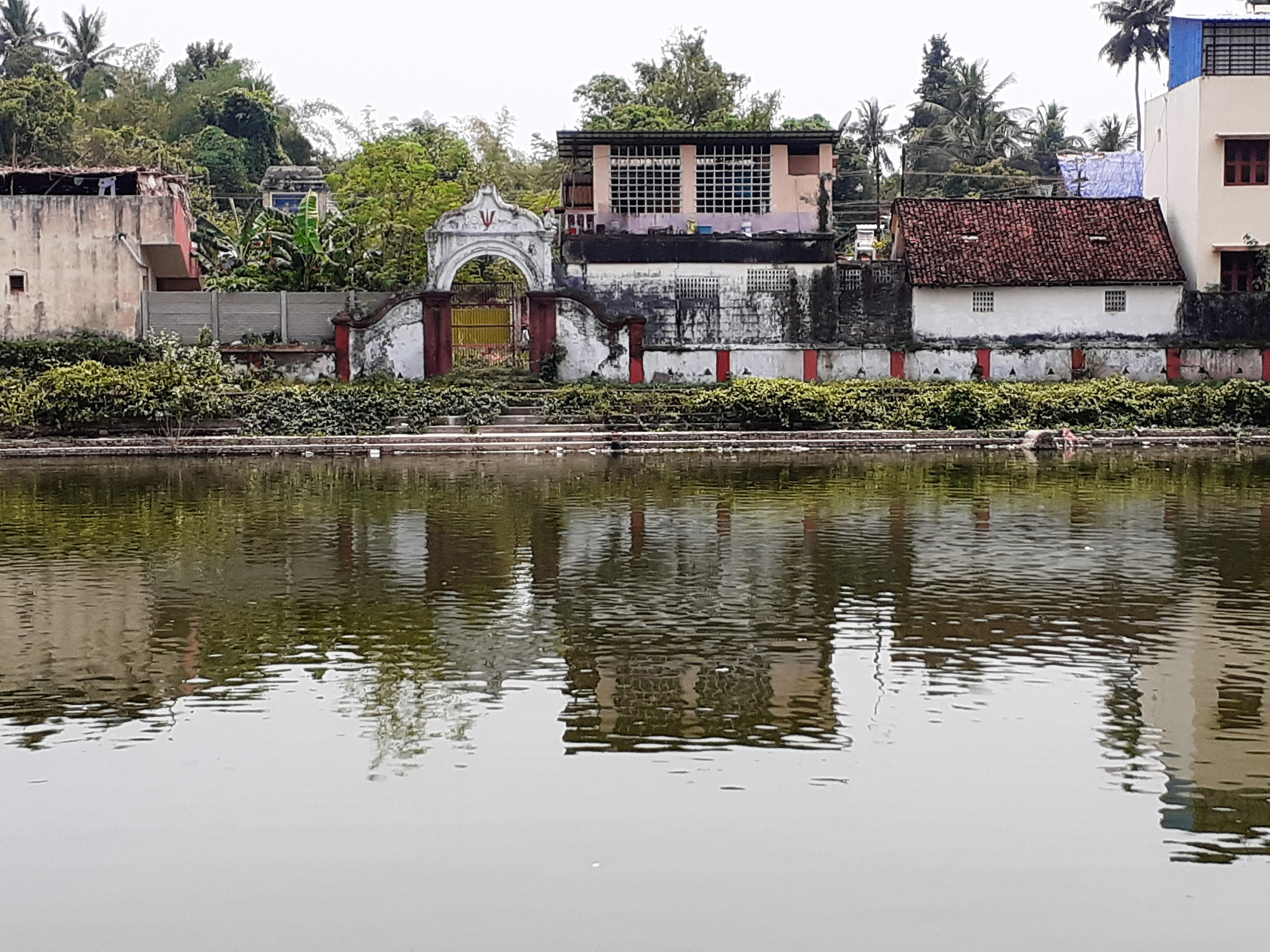
The temple tank

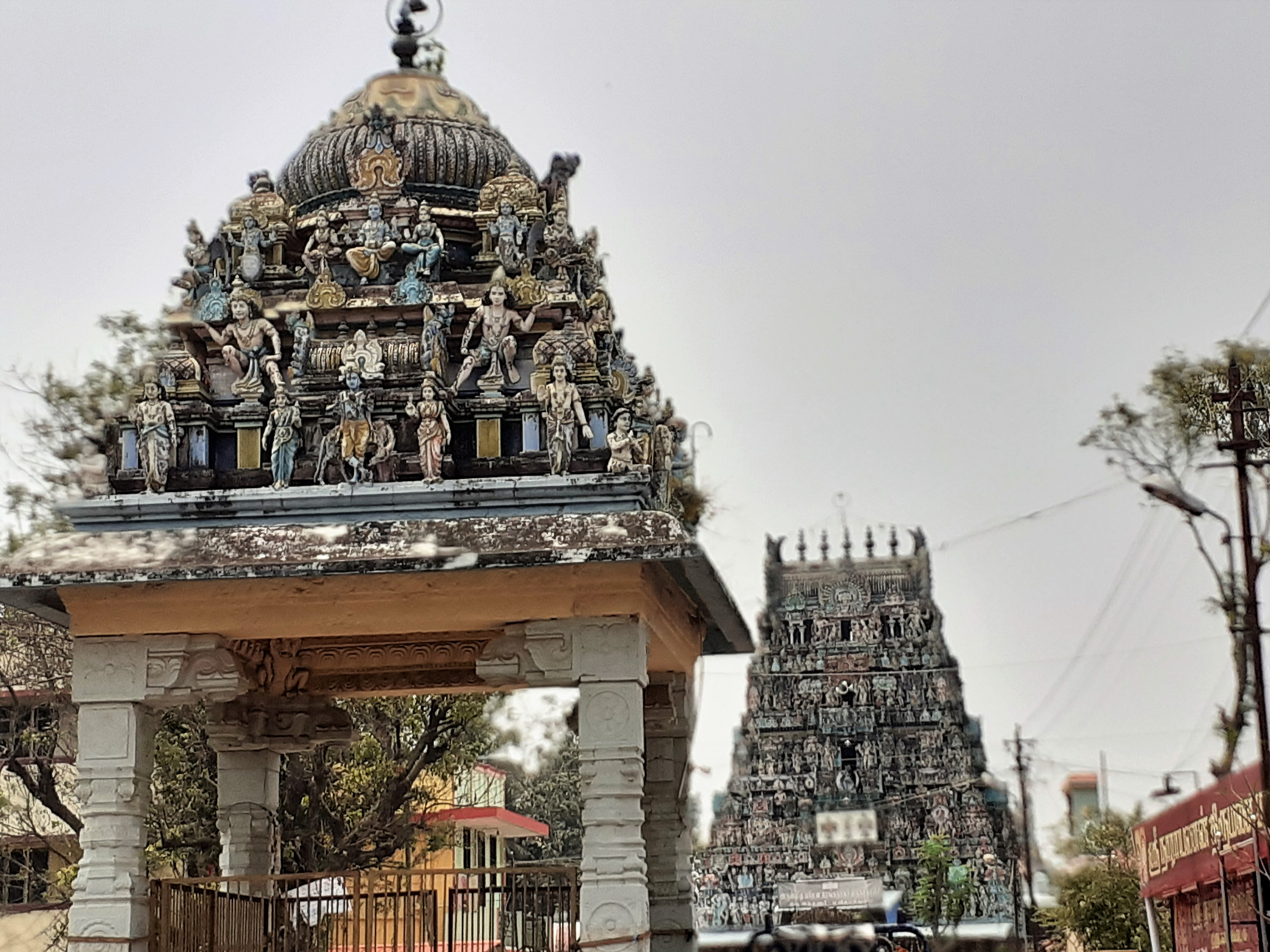
Exterior view of the rajagopuram year 2020

The temple is revered in Nalayira Divya Prabandham, the 7th–9th century Vaishnava canon and classified as a Divya Desam, the 108 Vishnu temples that are revered in the Vaishnava canon. Pancharanga Kshetrams (also called Pancharangams, meaning the "five Rangams or Ranganathas") is a group of five sacred Hindu temples, dedicated to Ranganatha, a reclining form of the god Vishnu, on the banks of the Kaveri River. The five Pancharanga Kshetrams in the order of their successive locations, on the banks of the Kaveri River are: The Srirangapatnam called the Adi Ranga, the first temple on the banks of the Kaveri River from the upstream side; the Srirangam (island in Tiruchirappalli) in Tamil Nadu known as Adya Ranga (the last temple), Appalarangam or Koviladi at Tiurppernagar in Tamil Nadu, Parimala Ranganatha Perumal Temple, Mayiladuthurai and Vatarangam at Sirkazhi. The Sarangapani temple at Kumbakonam is mentioned in place of Vatarangam in some references.

According to the sthala purana associated with the temple, the presiding deity, Parimala Rangan, is said to have a special connection with the River Cauvery. The tradition relates that Cauvery, distressed that she was accorded less reverence than the River Ganga, undertook penance before Parimala Rangan and expressed her grievance. Pleased with her devotion, the deity is believed to have assured her of greater sanctity and declared that he would manifest along the course of the Cauvery, particularly at Indalur, to enhance its spiritual significance.The legend further states that Ganga became burdened by the sins that devotees were believed to have washed away in her waters. According to the tradition, Parimala Rangan instructed Ganga to come to Indalur during the Tamil month of Thula (Aippasi) and unite with the Cauvery to regain her purity. The deity is said to have removed Ganga's accumulated sins and thereby restored the sanctity and honour of the Cauvery. The temple's iconography is traditionally regarded as representing this legend: Ganga is depicted at the feet of Parimala Rangan, while Cauvery is depicted near his head. It is traditionally believed that during all 30 days of the Thula month, Ganga comes to the temple and merges with the Cauvery at this sacred site. Devotees associate this belief with the practice known as Thula Snanam (sacred bathing). They traditionally hold that bathing in the Cauvery at this place during the Thula month can bring spiritual purification and absolution from sins.

According to the legend of Parimala Rangan, Cauvery is believed to have purified Ganga of her accumulated sins and thereby taken them upon herself. With the faith that Cauvery, who purified Ganga, will herself be purified at this sacred shrine, during Thula Snanam.

== Worship and festivals ==
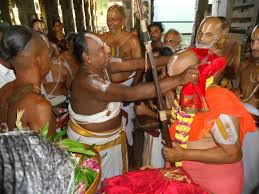
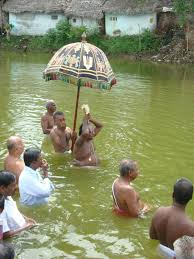
Festivals of the temple

The temple follows Pancharatra Agama and thenkalai tradition. The temple priests perform the pooja (rituals) during festivals and on a daily basis. Like other Vishnu temples of Tamil Nadu, the priests belong to the Vaishnava tradition, from the Brahmin community. The temple rituals are performed six times a day; Tiruvanandal at 8:00 a.m., Kala santhi at 9:00 a.m., Uchikalam at 12:30 p.m., Niyyanusandhanam at 6:00 p.m., Irandamkalam at 7:30 p.m. and Ardha Jamam at 9:00 p.m. Each ritual comprises three steps: alangaram (decoration), neivethanam (food offering) and deepa aradanai (waving of lamps) for both Parimala Ranganathar and Thayar. The food offerings during the six times are curd rice, Ven pongal, spiced rice, dosa, Ven pongal and sugar pongal respectively. The worship is held amidst music with nadasvaram (pipe instrument) and tavil (percussion instrument), religious instructions in the Vedas (sacred text) read by priests and prostration by worshippers in front of the temple mast. There are weekly, fortnightly and monthly rituals.

The major festival celebrated in the temple is the Chitrai festival, celebrated during the Tamil month of Chittirai. The other festivals in the temple include the 10-day Aaandal Aadi festival celebrated during July–August, Thayar Navaratri Utsavam during the Tamil month of Purattasi (September - October), 10-day Aipasi Thula Mahostavam during Aipasi (October - November), 10-day Vaikunta Ekadasi during Margali (December - January), Makara Sankranthi during January and Panguni Brahmotsavam during the month of Panguni (March - April).

== Gallery ==
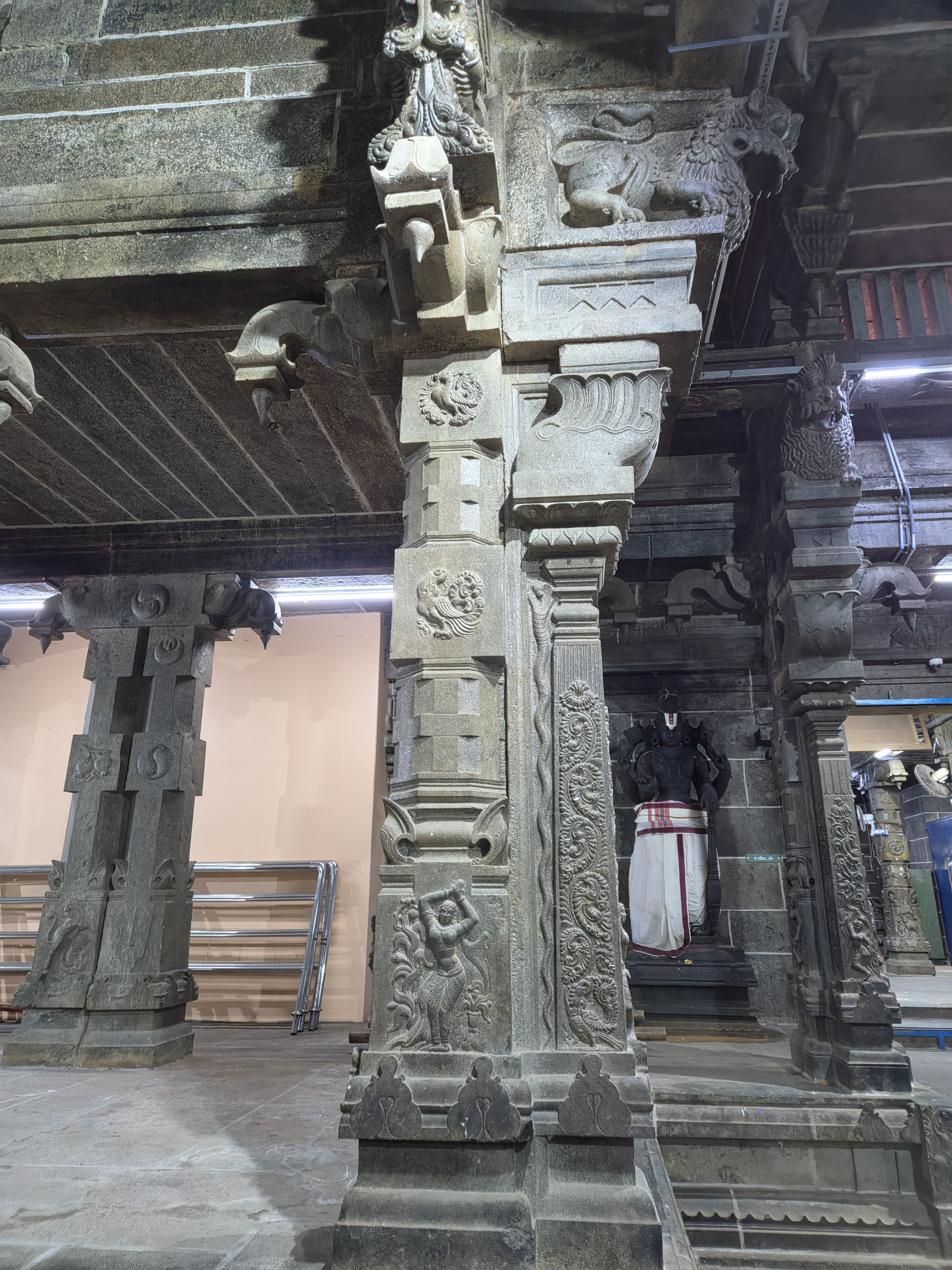
Interior mandapa with carved pillar

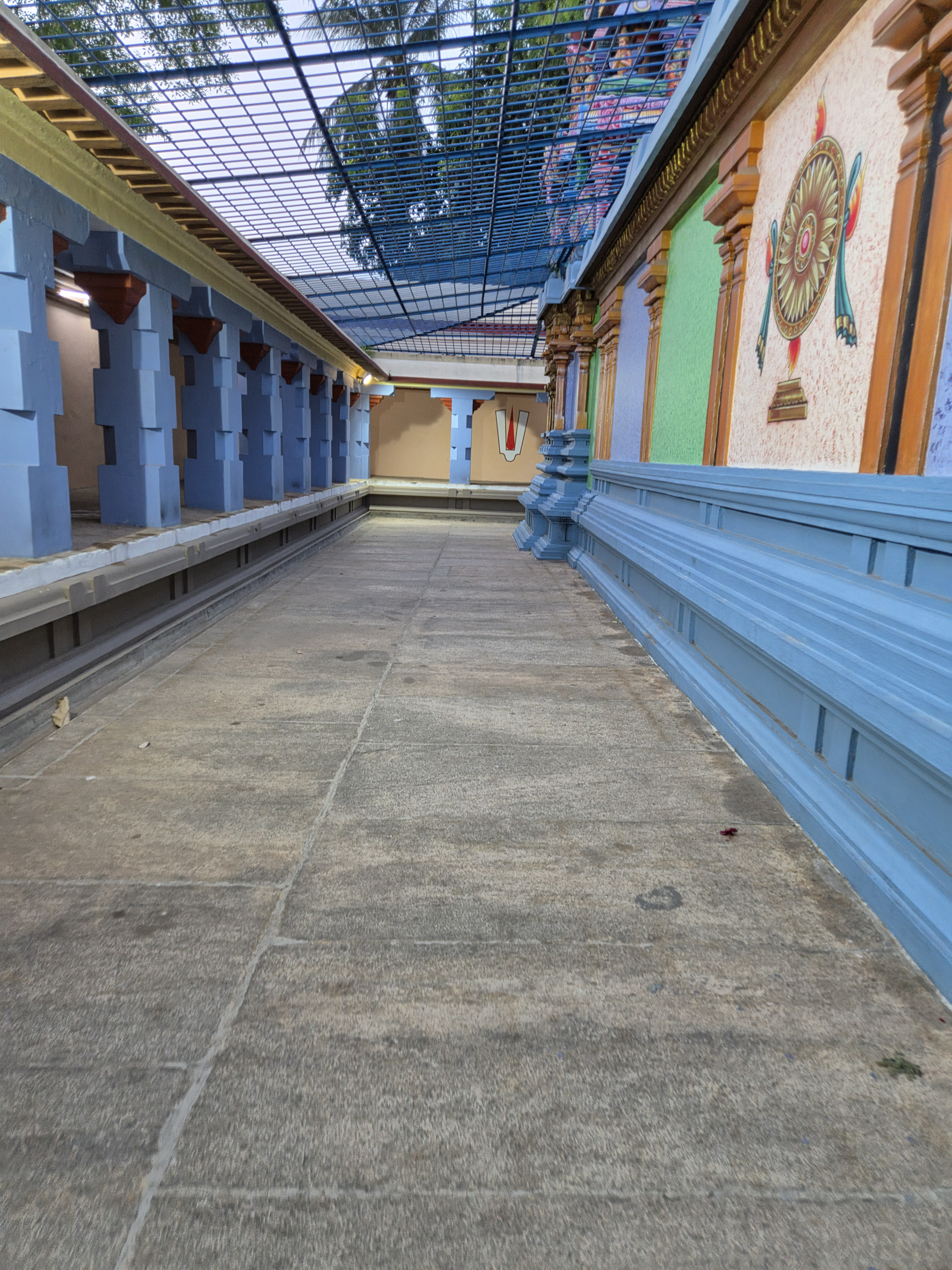
Covered prakara corridor

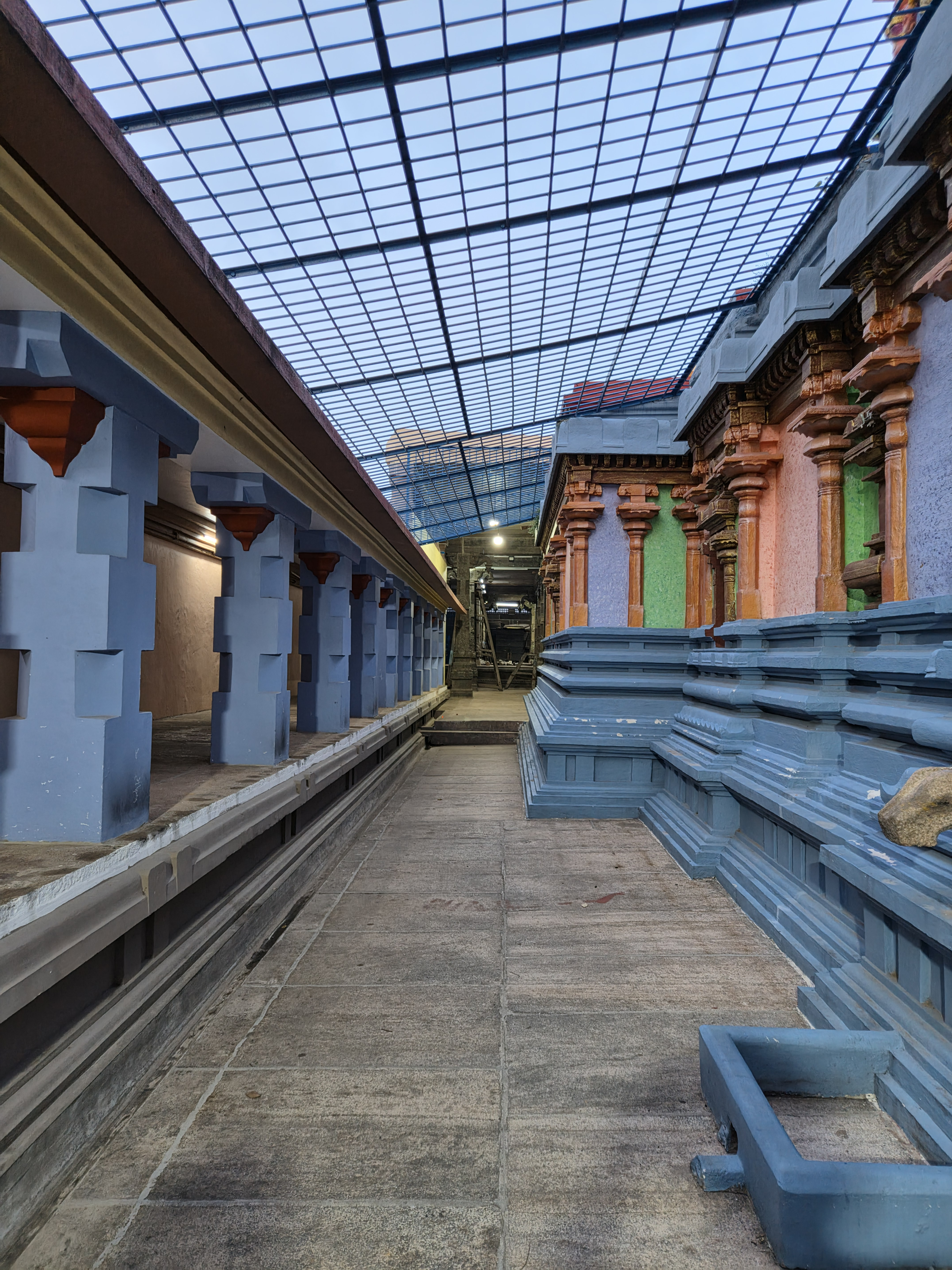
Another view of the prakara

Pillared hall with kolam

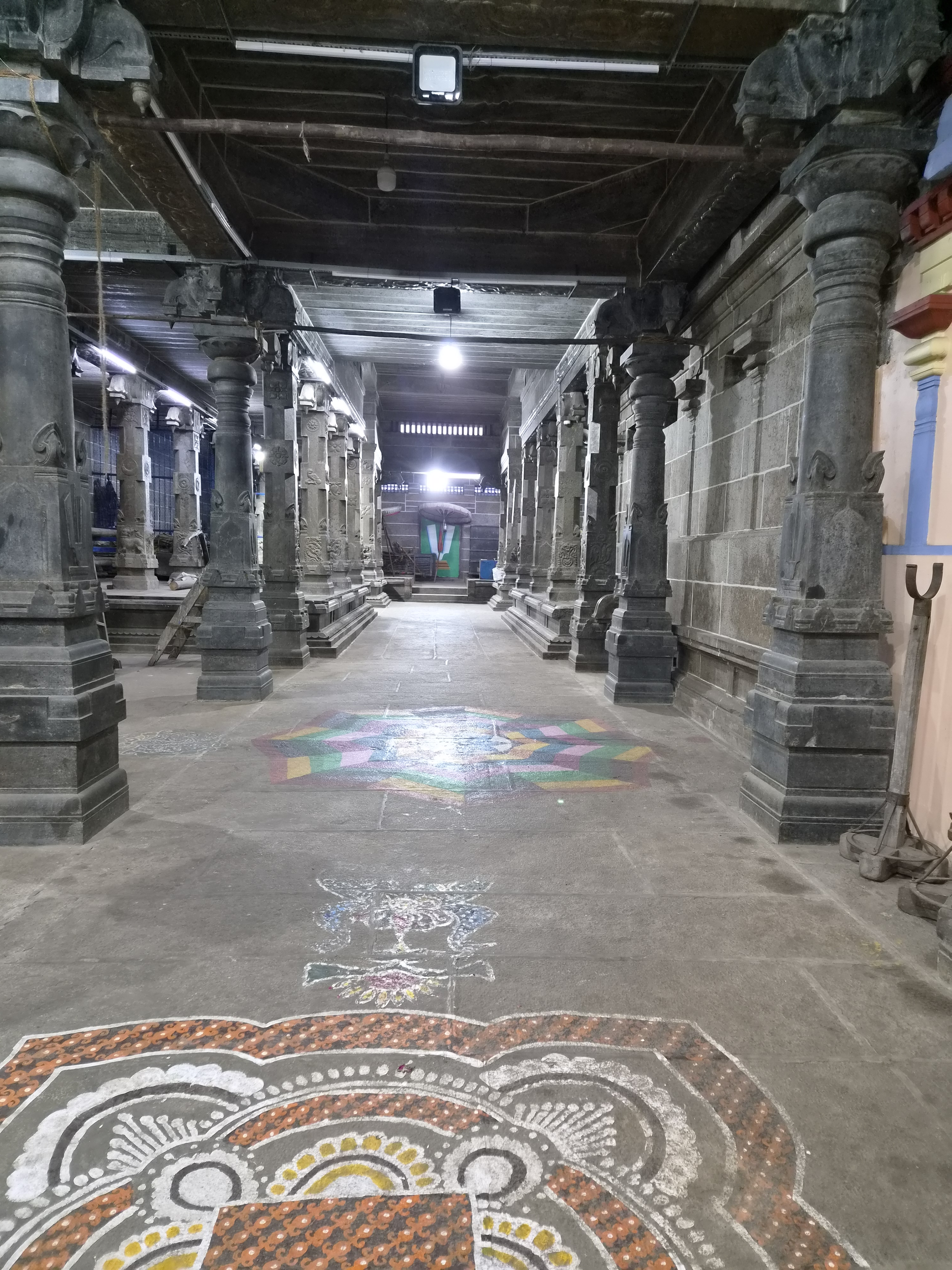
Central view of the mandapa

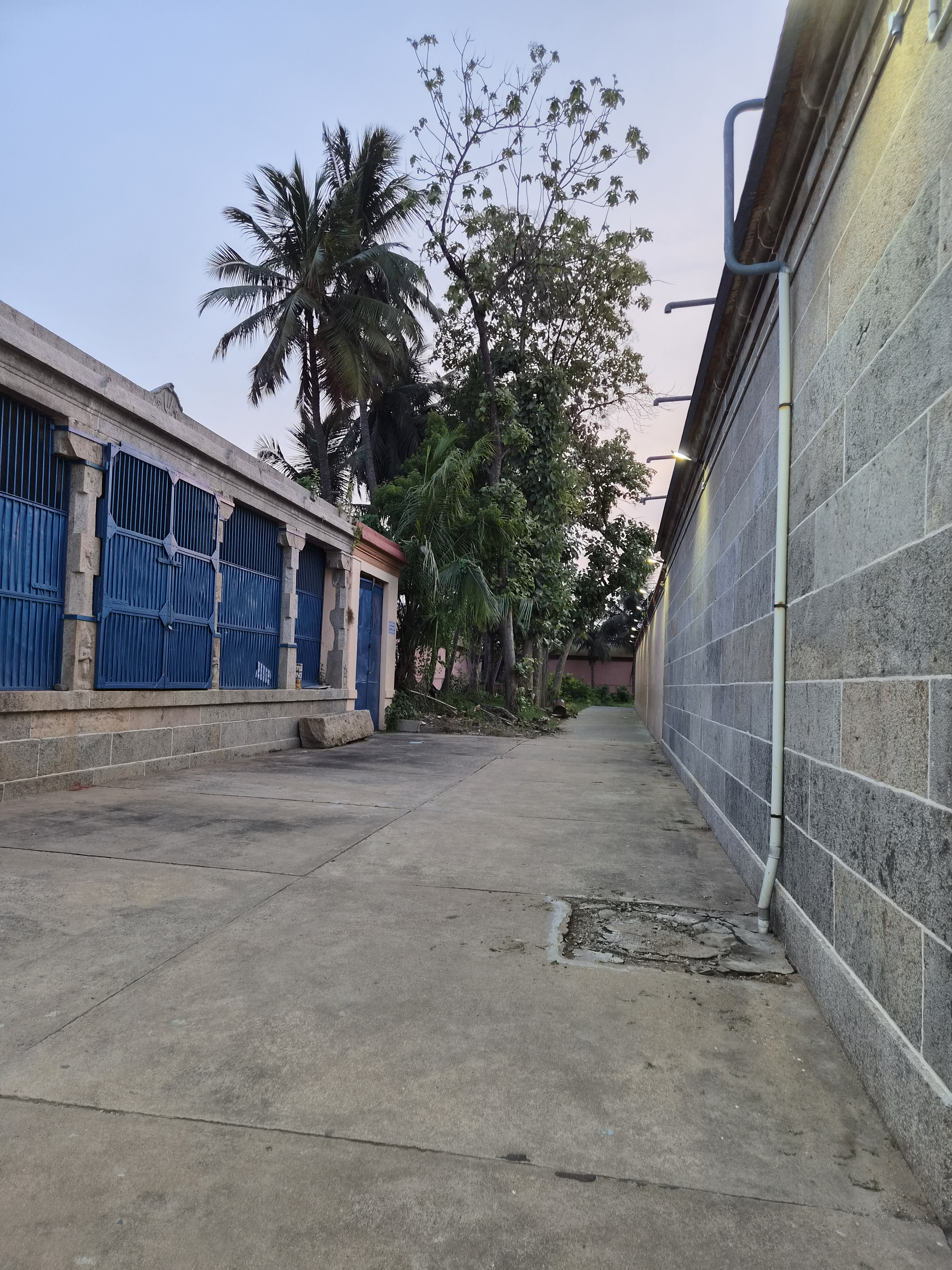
Outer courtyard and boundary wall

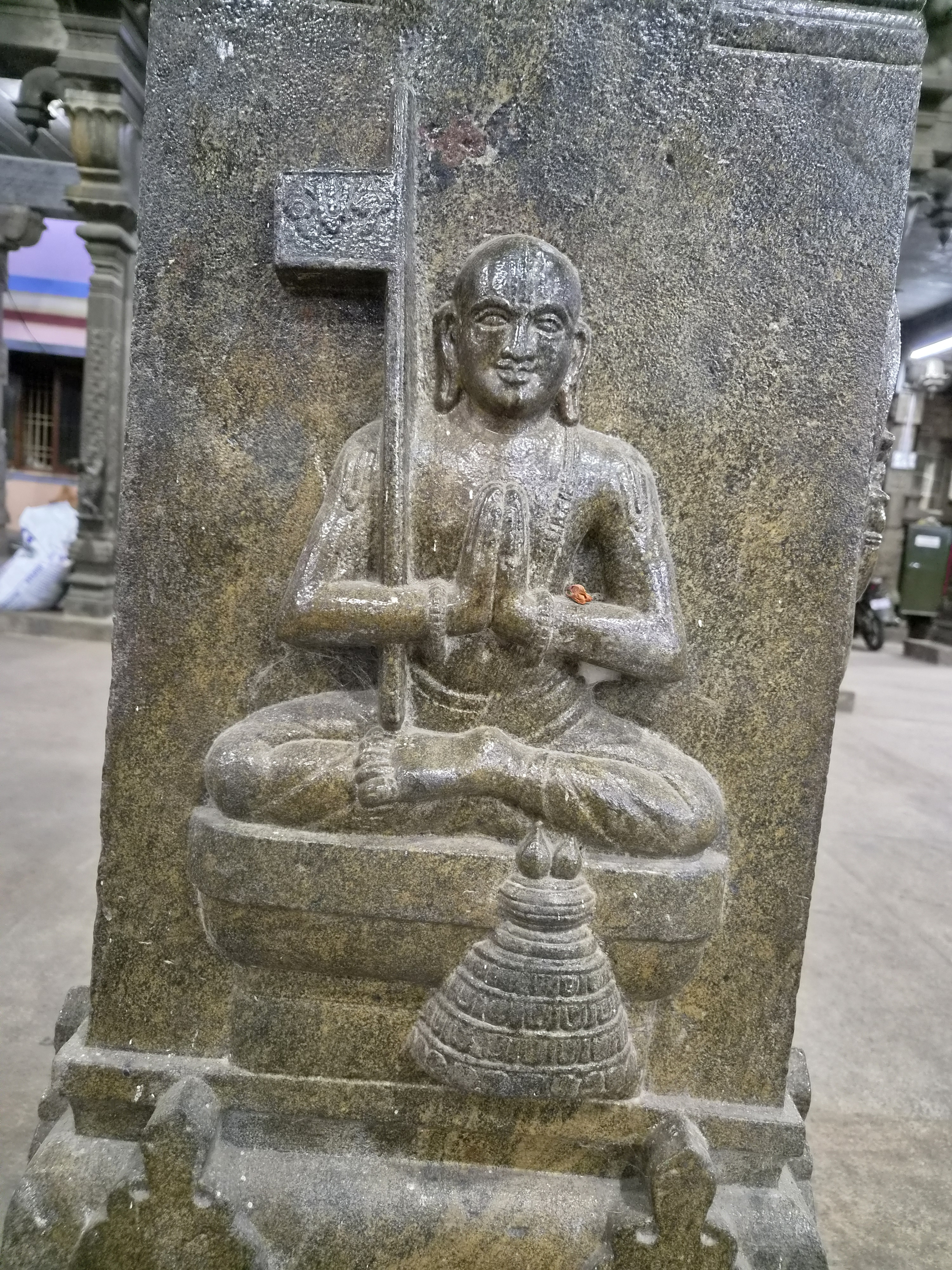
Carved relief of a seated saint

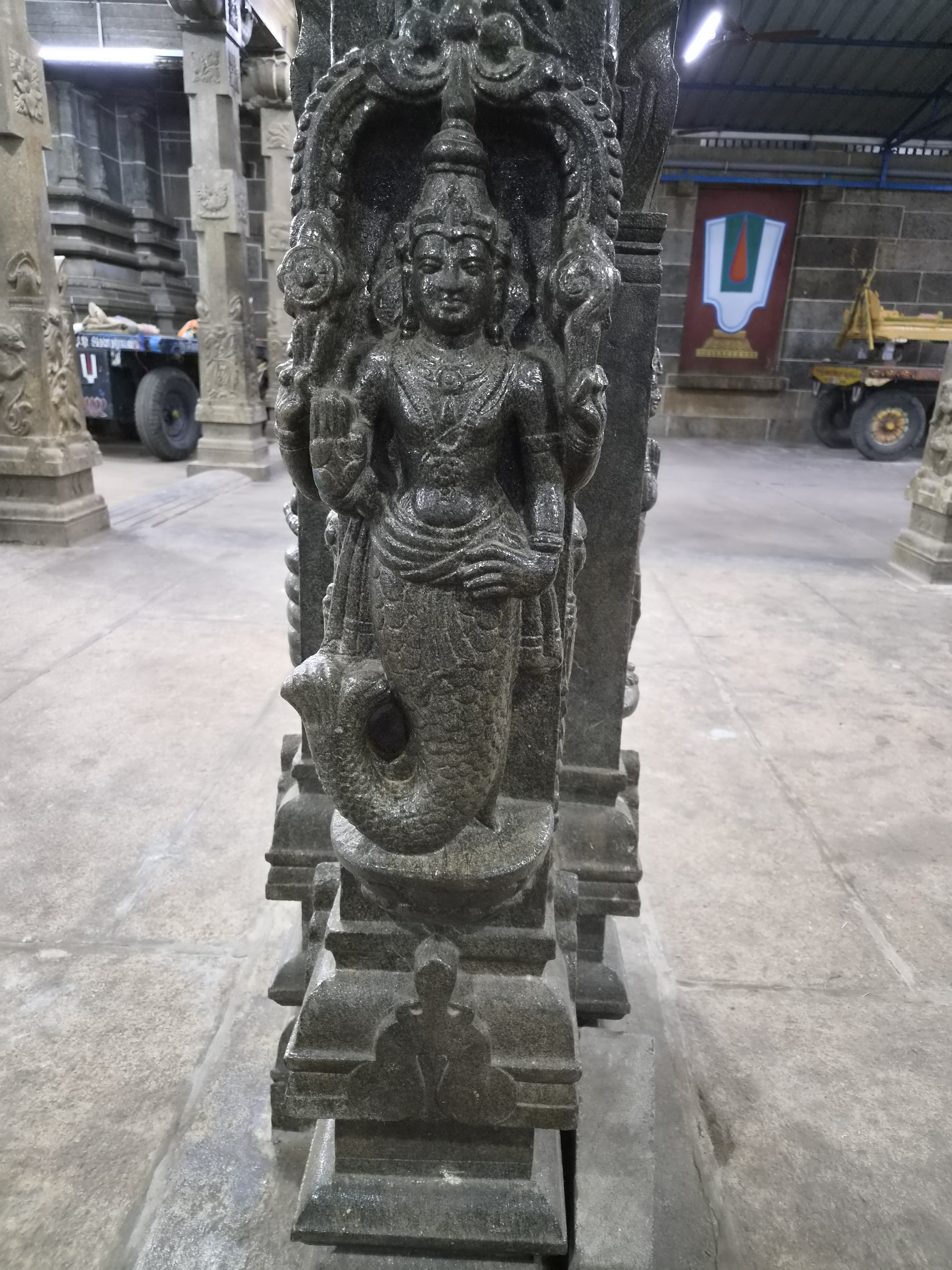
Carved pillar figure of a female deity

== See also ==
- Divya Desams
- Mangalasasanam by Divyadesam
