= Ranganathaswamy Temple, Srirangapatna =

Vishnu temple in Srirangapatna

Ranganathaswamy temple
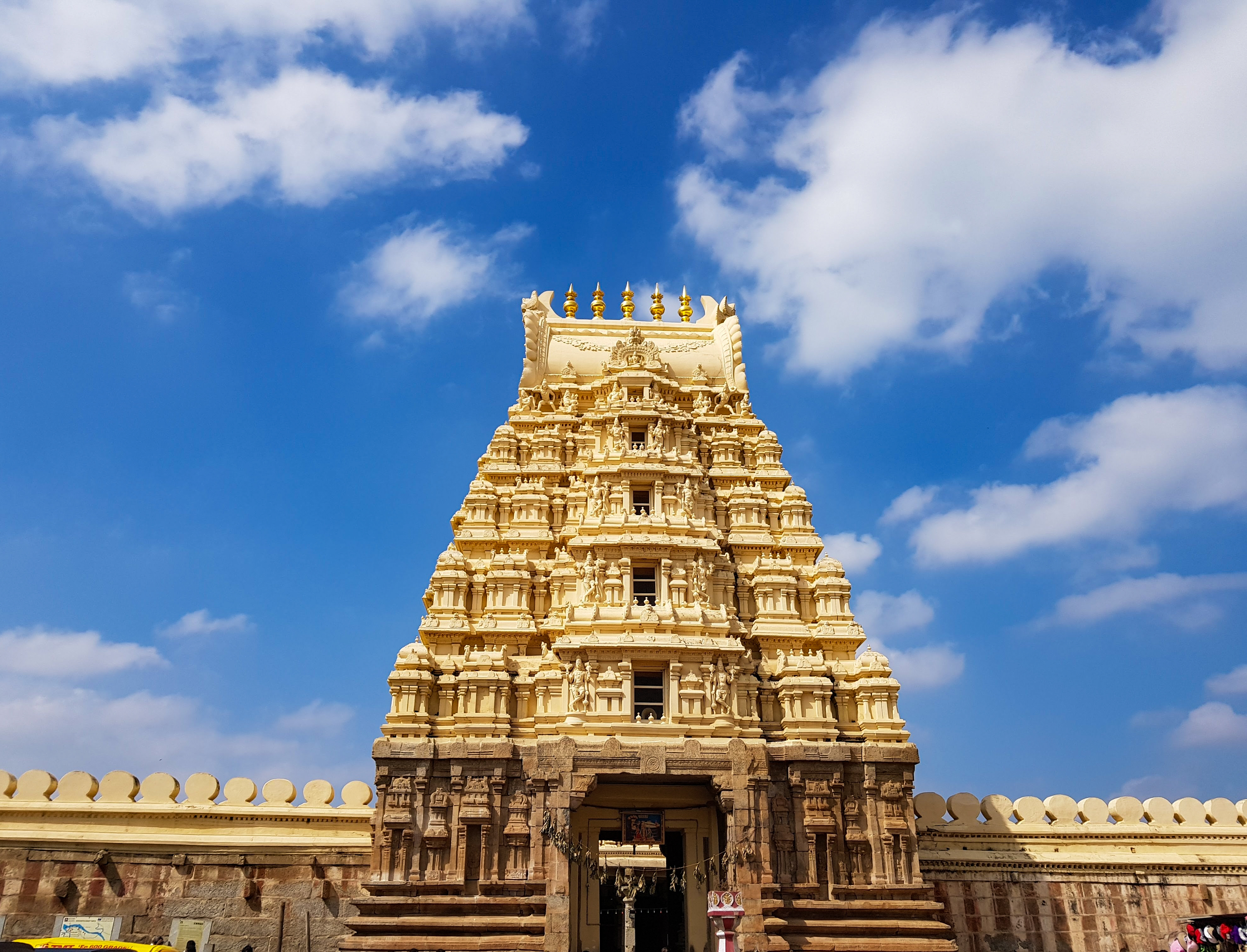
- The Temple Gopuram

- Location within Karnataka

Religion
- Affiliation: Hinduism
- Deity: Ranganatha (Vishnu)

Location
- Location: Karnataka, India
- Country: India
- Interactive map of Ranganathaswamy temple
- Coordinates: 12.4247524°N 76.6797229°E

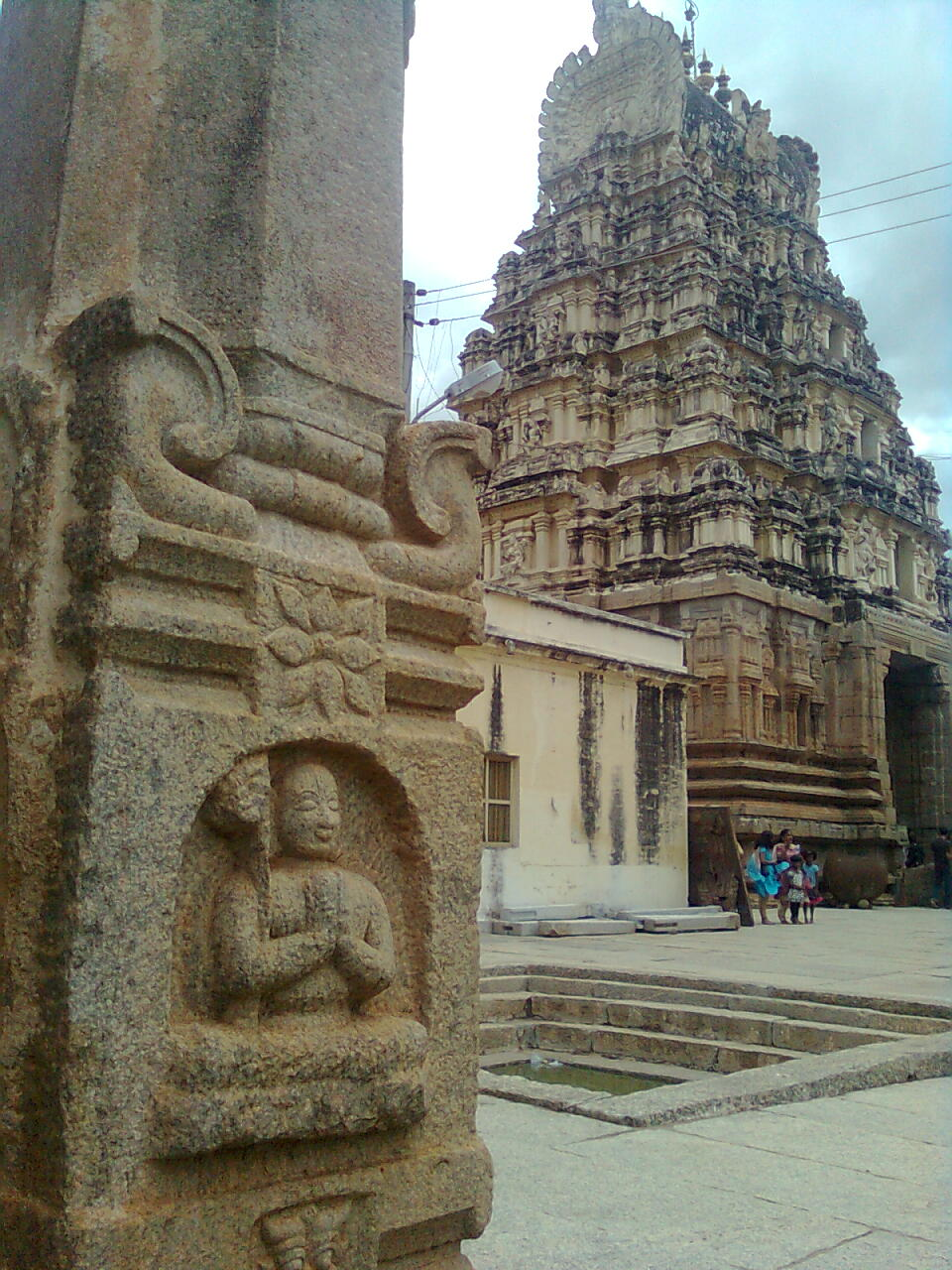
The tower in Vijayanagara seen from the pushkarni (temple tank) in the complex

The Ranganathaswamy temple or Sri Ranganathaswamy temple in Srirangapatna, in the Mandya district of Karnataka state, India, is dedicated to the Hindu god Ranganatha (a manifestation of Vishnu). The temple is classified one among the 108 Abhimana Kshethram of Vaishnavate tradition. It is one of the five important pilgrimage sites of Smarthas and Sri Vaishnavism along the river Kaveri for devotees of Ranganatha. These five sites are collectively known as Pancharanga Kshetrams in South India. It is also part of the famous pilgrimage Tri Ranga darshana, which involves visiting the three Ranga temples on a single day, other two being Madhya Ranga and Anthya Ranga. Since Srirangapatna is the first temple starting from upstream, the deity is known as Adi Ranga. The town of Srirangapatna, which derives its name from the temple, is located on an island in the river Kaveri.

== History ==
According to the Archaeological Survey of India (ASI), the temple is one of considerable antiquity. An inscription at the temple reveals it was constructed in 894 CE by a local chief called Tirumalaiah, a vassal of the Western Ganga dynasty. Earlier mentions of the existence of the deity at Srirangapatna have been made, this indicates that a temple was likely built atop an already existing shrine of Raṅganāthaswāmi. In the early 12th century, Hoysala King Vishnuvardhana (r. 1108-1152 CE) granted the village of Srirangapatna to the Vaishnava saint Ramanujacharya as an agraharam (place of learning). An inscription of the great Hoysala King Veera Ballala II (1210 CE) confirms that additions and renovations were made to the temple at that time. The tower over the entrance bears features consistent with Vijayanagara architecture. According to historian George Michell, contributions were also made by the Wodeyar kings of the Kingdom of Mysore. The temple is just 400 metres away from Tipu palace. The temple is protected by the Archaeological Survey of India as a monument of national importance. According to historian K.V. Soundararajan, the Ranganatha temples in South India built during the 9th and 10th centuries have a systematic arrangement of subsidiary deities as seen in this temple along with the Appakkudathaan Perumal Temple at Koviladi, Sowmya Narayana Perumal temple at Thirukoshtiyur, Veeraraghava Perumal Temple at Thiruevvul and Rajagopalaswamy temple at Mannargudi.

== Temple plan ==
The temple has an imposing tower over the entrance gate (gopura) and two large concentric rectangular enclosures (prakara) around its perimeter. The entrance to the inner sanctum (garbhagriha) is through multiple columned halls (mantapa). A vestibule (sukhanasi), hall (navaranga or just mantapa) and a front hall (mukhamantapa) are the other main structures in the temple. The roof of the mukhamantapa is decorated with a "garland" ("hara") of miniature decorative towers (called "kudu" and "sala" shikharas) whose niches contain stucco images of the god Vishnu.

In the sanctum, the image of Vishnu reclines on the coils of the snake Adisesha, under a canopy formed by the snake's seven hoods, with his consort Lakshmi at his feet. Flanking Vishnu are other deities from the Hindu pantheon; Sridevi, Bhudevi (goddess of earth) and Brahma (the creator). There are other smaller shrines within the complex dedicated to Narasimha (an avatar of Vishnu), Gopalakrishna, Srinivasa (manifestation of Vishnu), Hanuman, Garuda and the Alwar saints.

The Three sacred sites for Smartha -BaboorKamme & Sri Vaishnava Sects of South India, Both Adi Shankara and Ramanujacharya has visited and glorified the deities in their Hymns. The following temples are considered the five sacred sites of worship of the god Ranganatha and are together called Pancharanga Kshetram (Pancha-"five", ranga-"Ranganatha", Kshetram-"sites").

Temple	Location
Sri Ranganathaswamy Temple, Srirangapatna (Adi Ranga)	Srirangapatna - Adi Ranga - 1st Holy Site and Very Important Site of Ranganatha Temples in south India
Sri Ranganathaswamy Temple, Shivanasamudra (Madhya Ranga)	Shivanasamudra - Madhya Ranga - 2nd most holy temple of Sri Ranganatha in South India. The Government of Karnataka has improved the temple and now many pilgrims across South India visit this famous site . Here, Sri Ranganathaswamy is called as "Madhya Ranga. The God is in reclining posture as found in Srirangam and Srirangapatnam. It is said that the God here represents 'Youth' and hence also called as "Mohana Ranga".
Sri Ranganatha Swamy Temple (Anthya Ranga)	Srirangam- 3rd Anthya Ranga or last Holy Site of Sri Ranganatha temple in south India -Most Holy temple of Sri Ranganatha in south India
Sarangapani Temple	Kumbakonam - not part of three important Ranganatha kshetrams but listed as five pancharangas .
Sri Appakkudathan Temple	Trichy—not part of three important Ranganatha kshetrams but listed as five pancharangas .
Parimala Ranganatha Perumal Temple	Indalur, Mayiladuthurai- - not part of three important Ranganatha kshetrams but listed as five pancharangas .
Ranganatha Temple, Nellore	Nellore—not part of three important Ranganatha kshetrams but listed as five pancharangas .

== Gallery ==
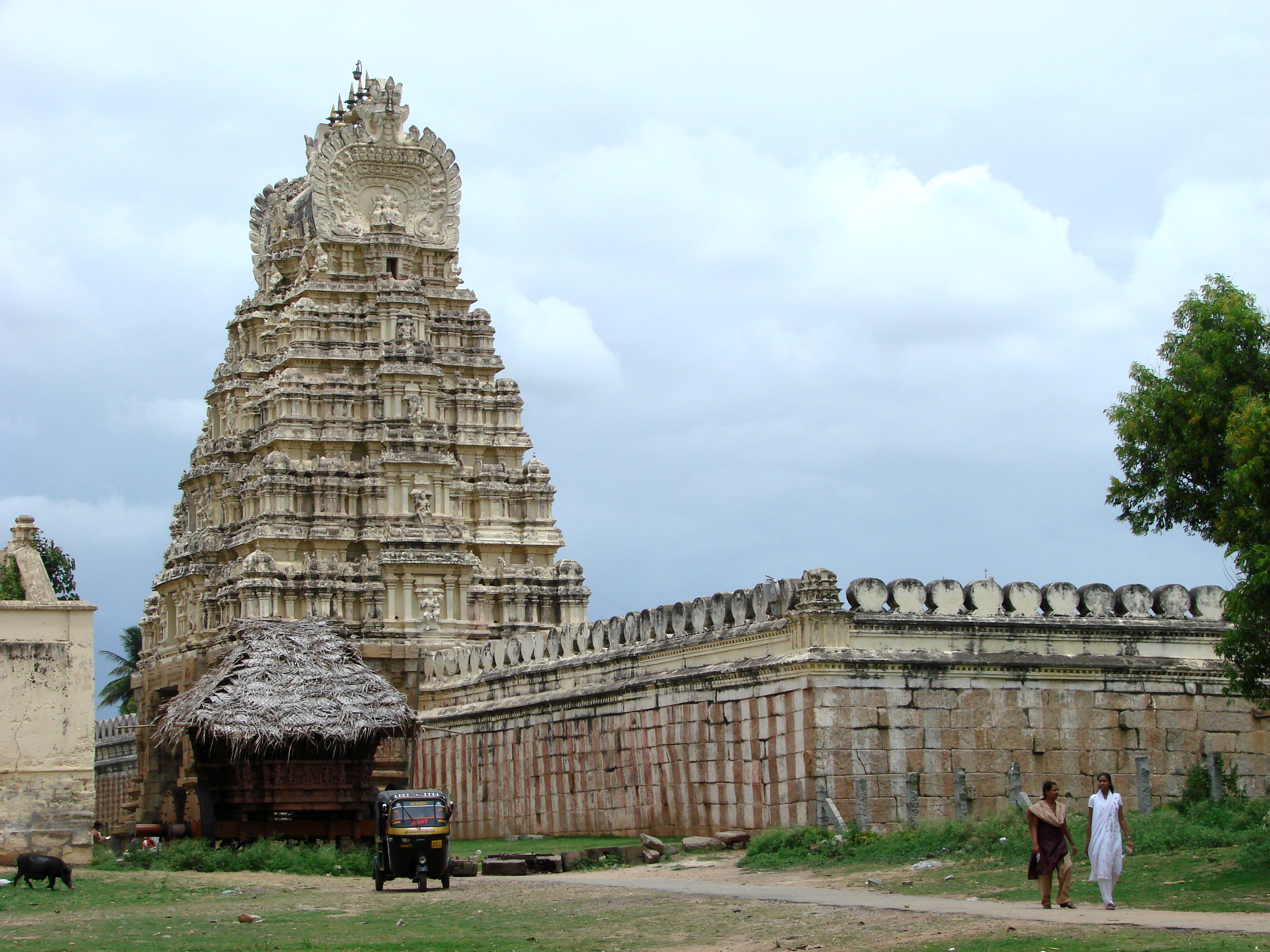
A profile of the gopuram (tower) over entrance in the Ranganathaswamy temple at Srirangapatna

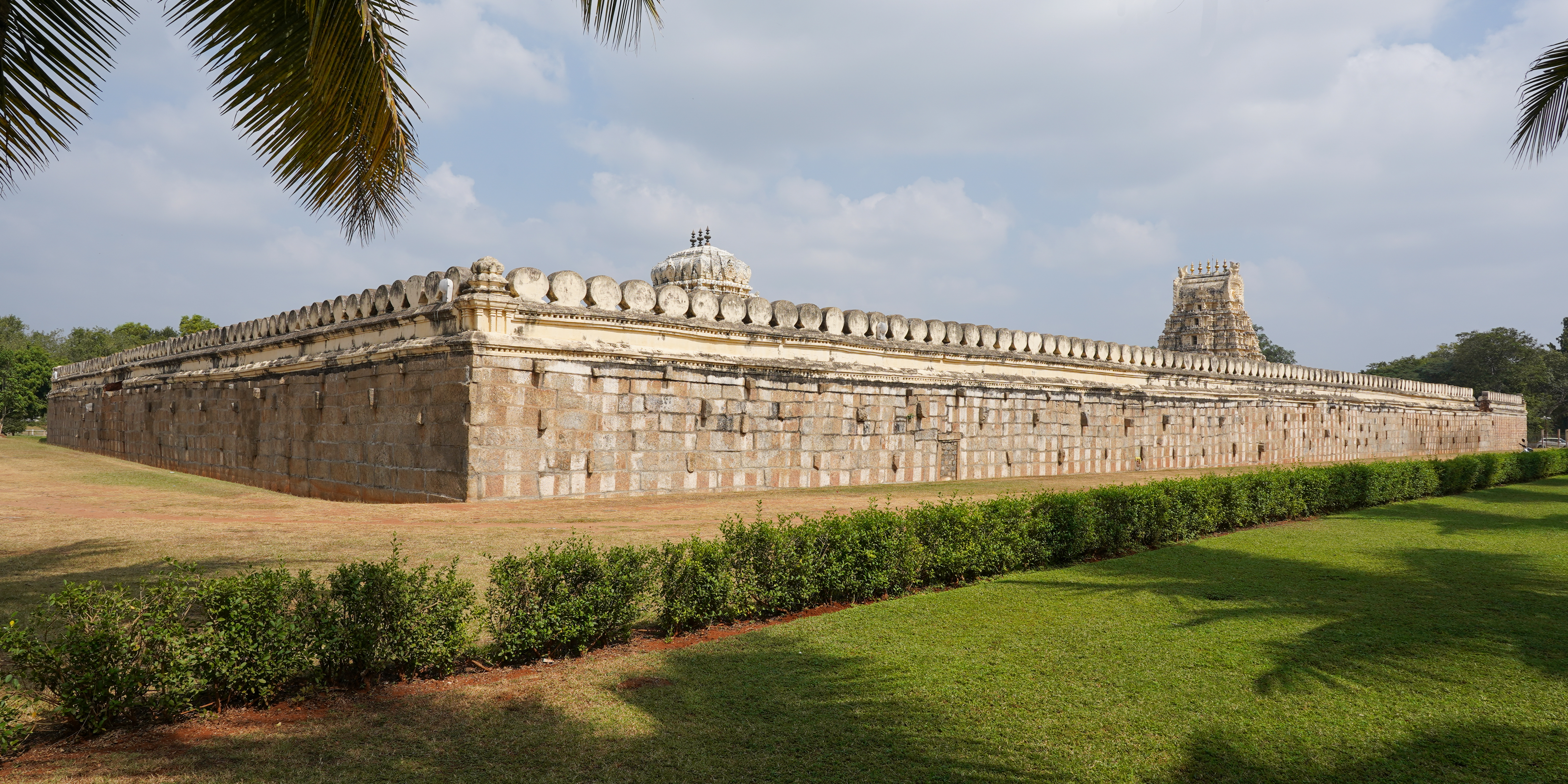
Prakaram (outer wall) viewed from south-west

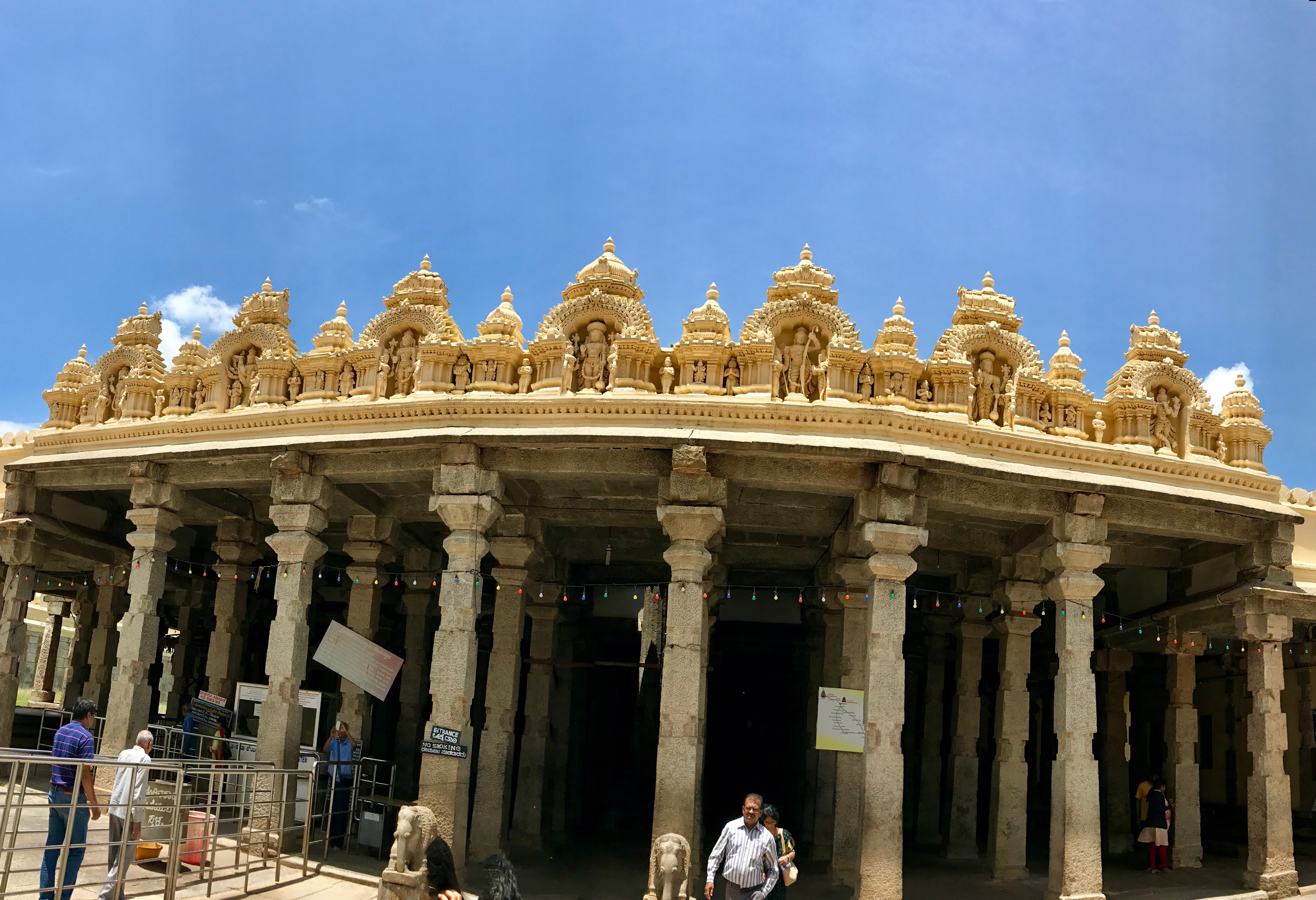
A view of the entrance into the main temple hall (mukhamantapa) with Vishnu avatars such as Narasimha, Vamana, Rama and Krishna on top

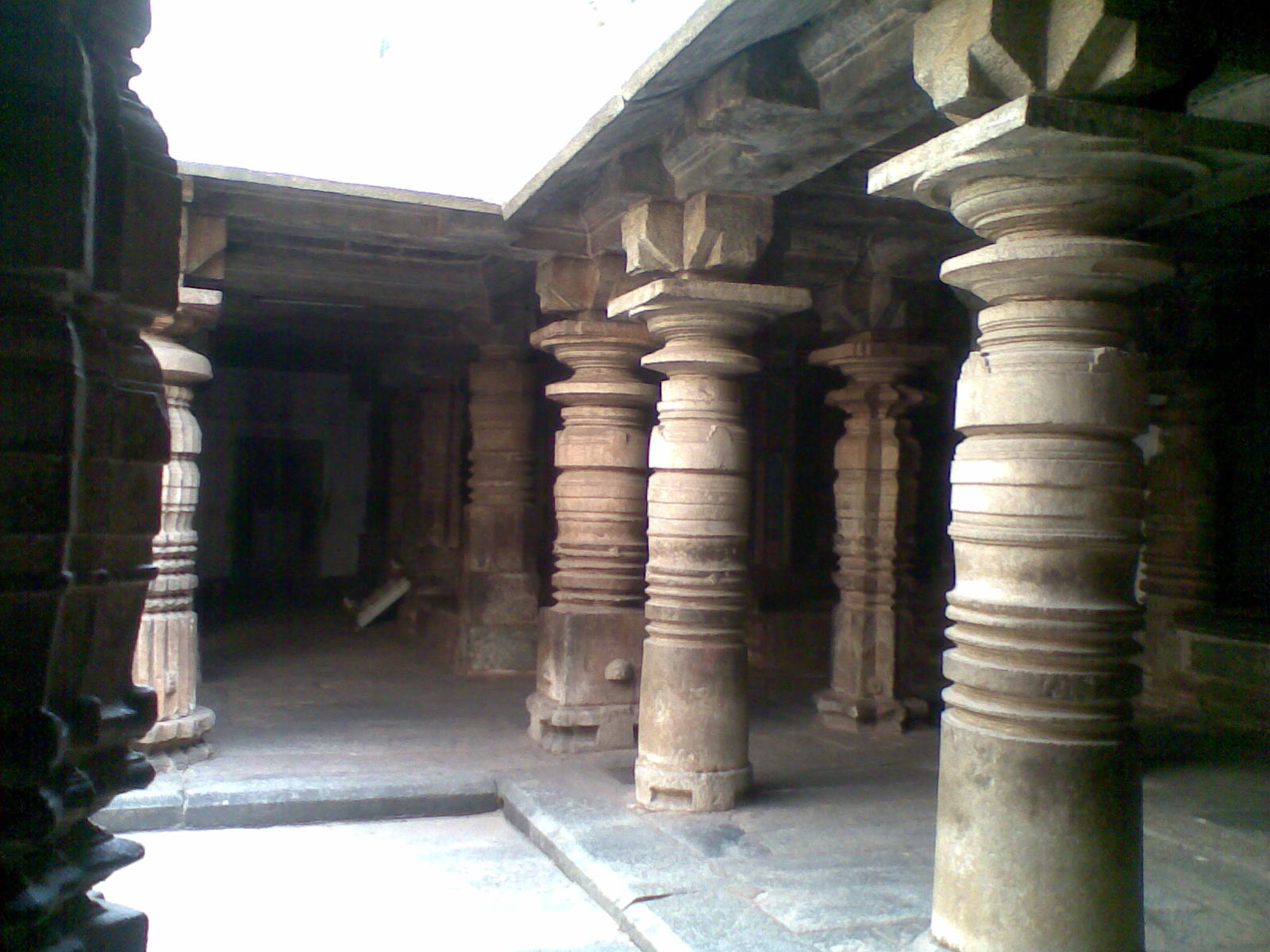
Lathe turned pillars, a Hoysala addition to the temple, in the inner open mantapa (hall) in the Ranganathaswamy temple at Srirangapatna

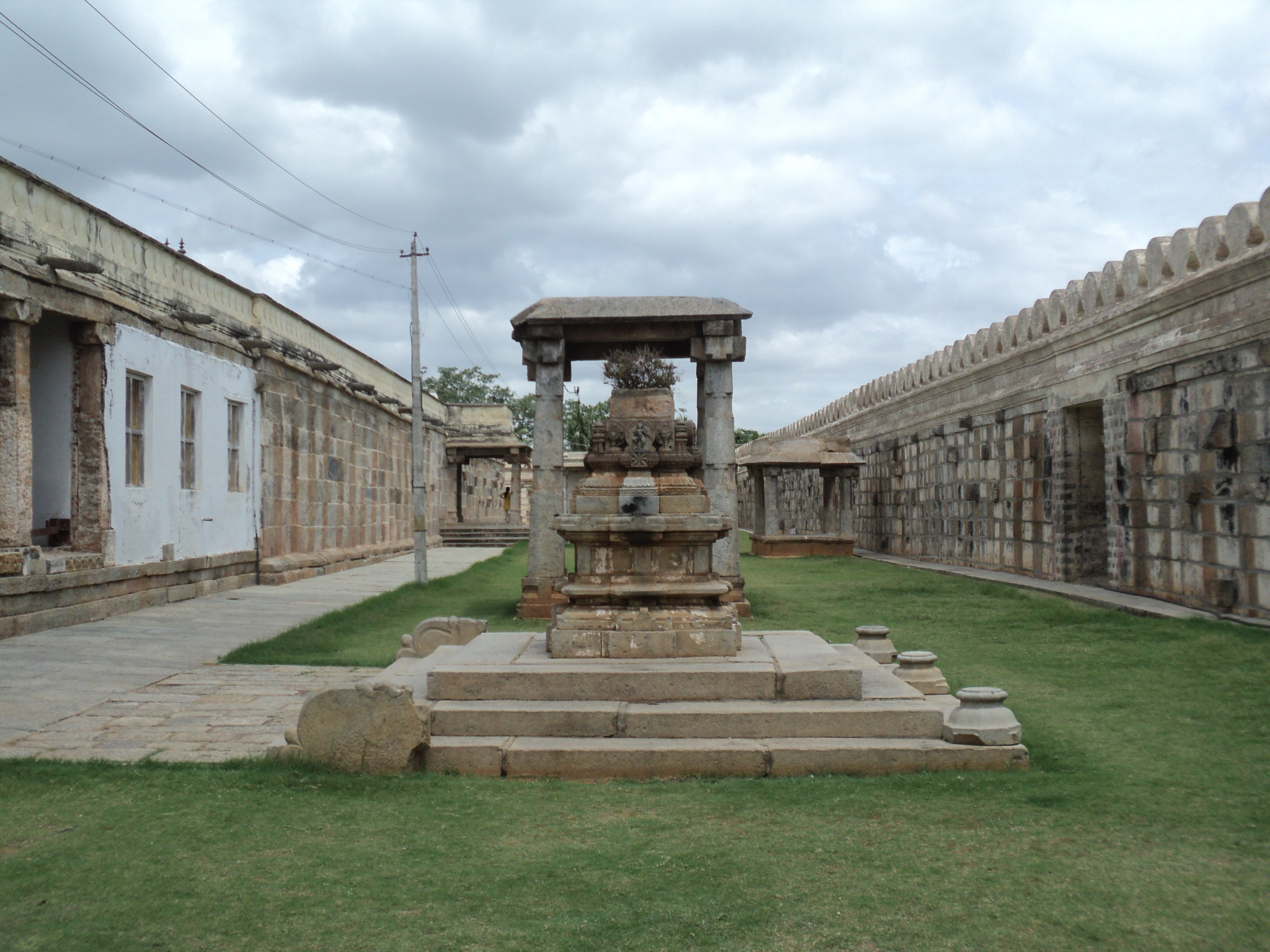
A view of the prakara (bounding wall) in the Ranganathaswamy temple at Srirangapatna

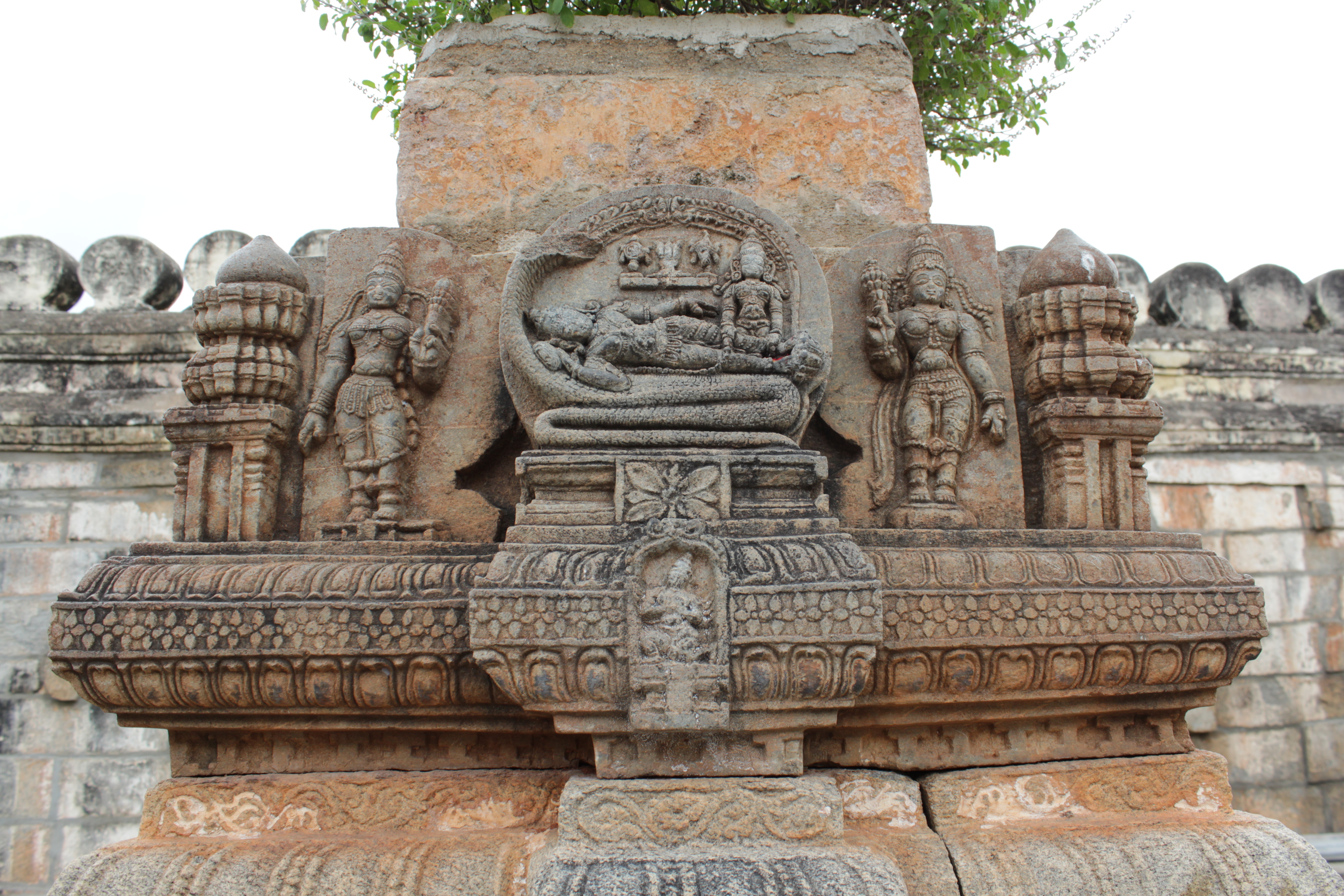
A relief sculpture on a minor shrine on a pedestal in the Ranganathaswamy temple at Srirangapatna

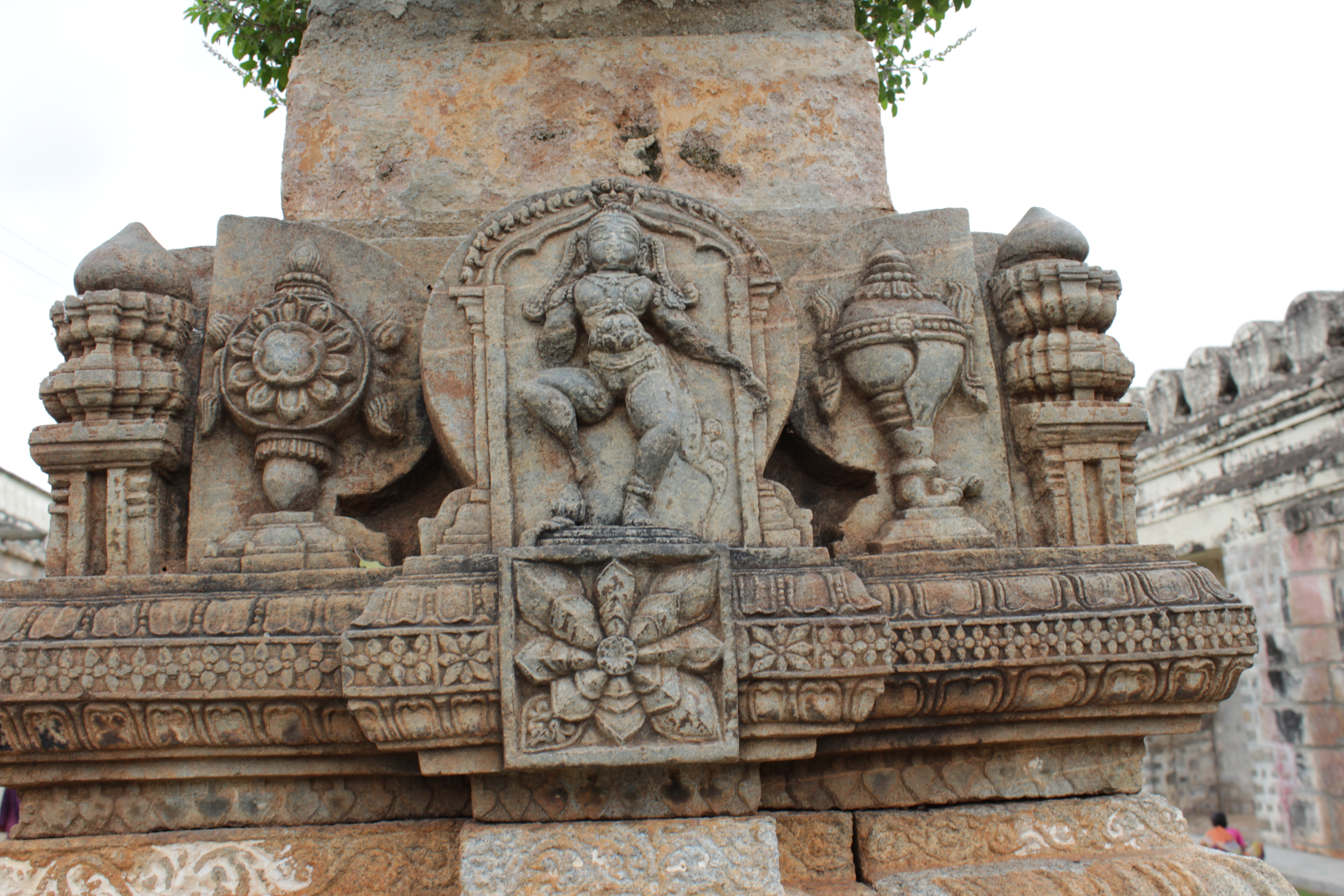
A relief sculpture on a minor shrine on a pedestal in the Ranganathaswamy temple at Srirangapatna

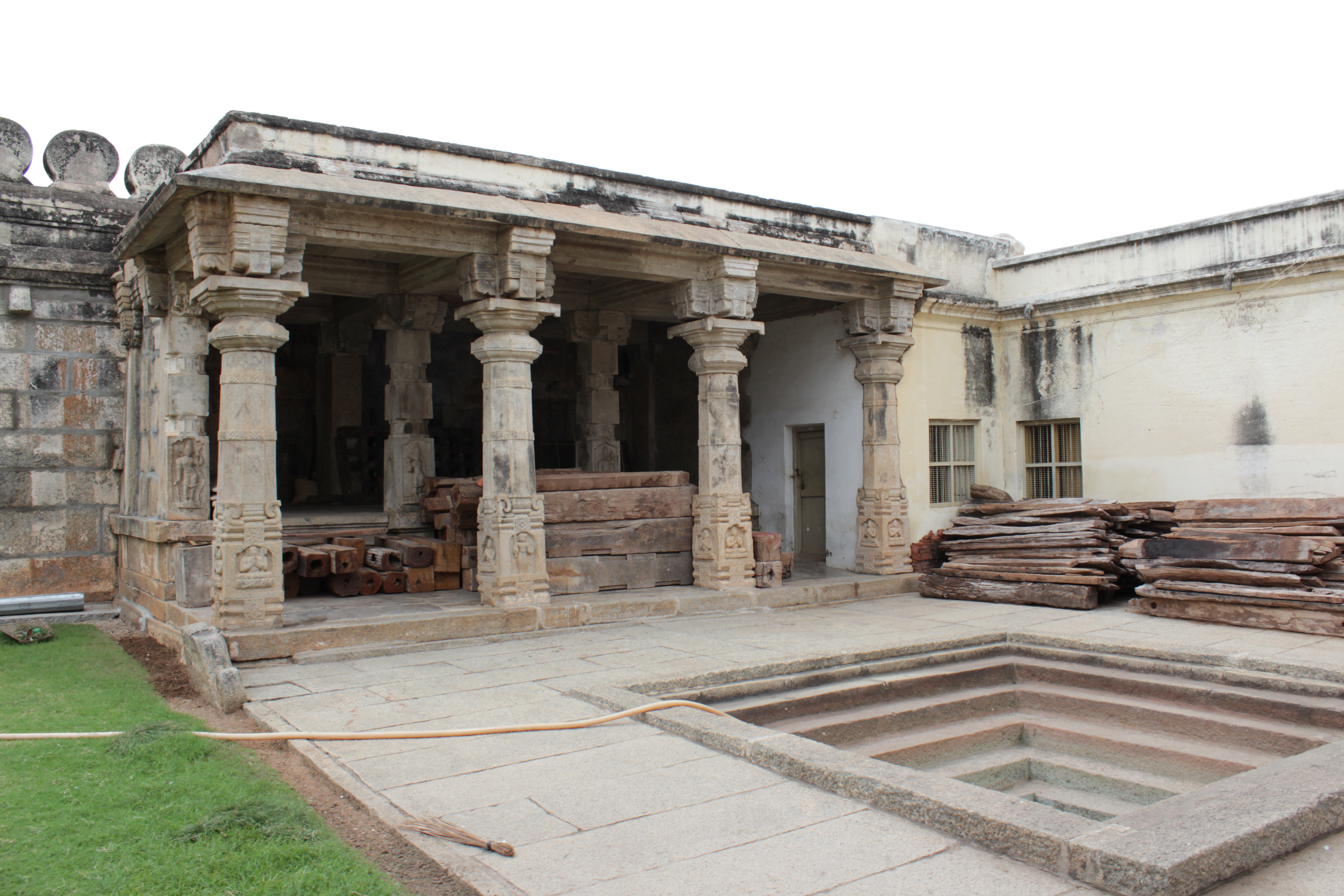
An open mantapa (hall) inside the complex in the Ranganathaswamy temple at Srirangapatna

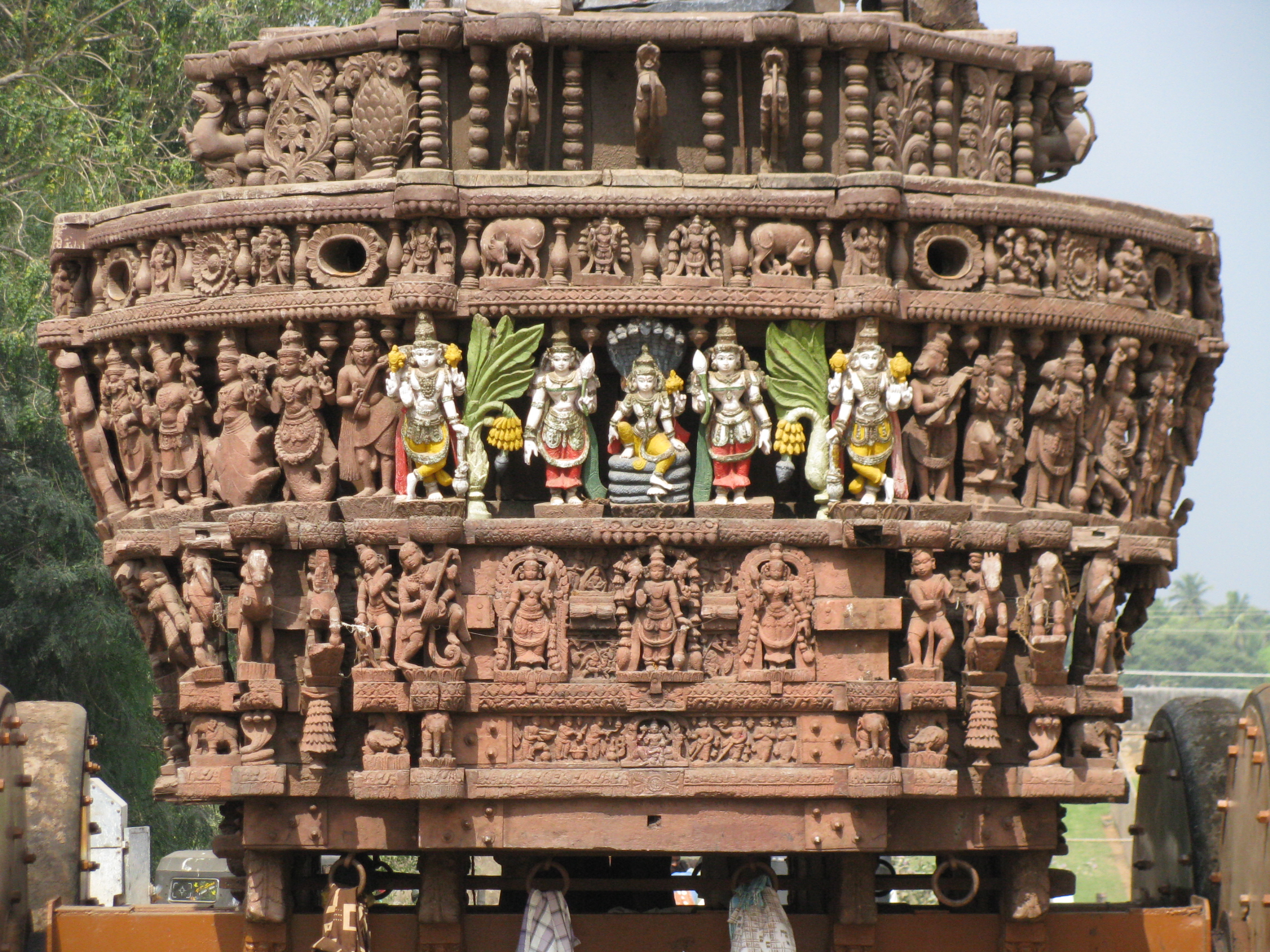
Chariot at Sri Ranganathaswamy temple

== See also ==
- Vaishnavism
- Divya Desams
- Pancharanga Kshetrams
