= Ranganathaswamy Temple, Shivanasamudra =

Sri Ranganthaswamy temple, Shivanasamudra
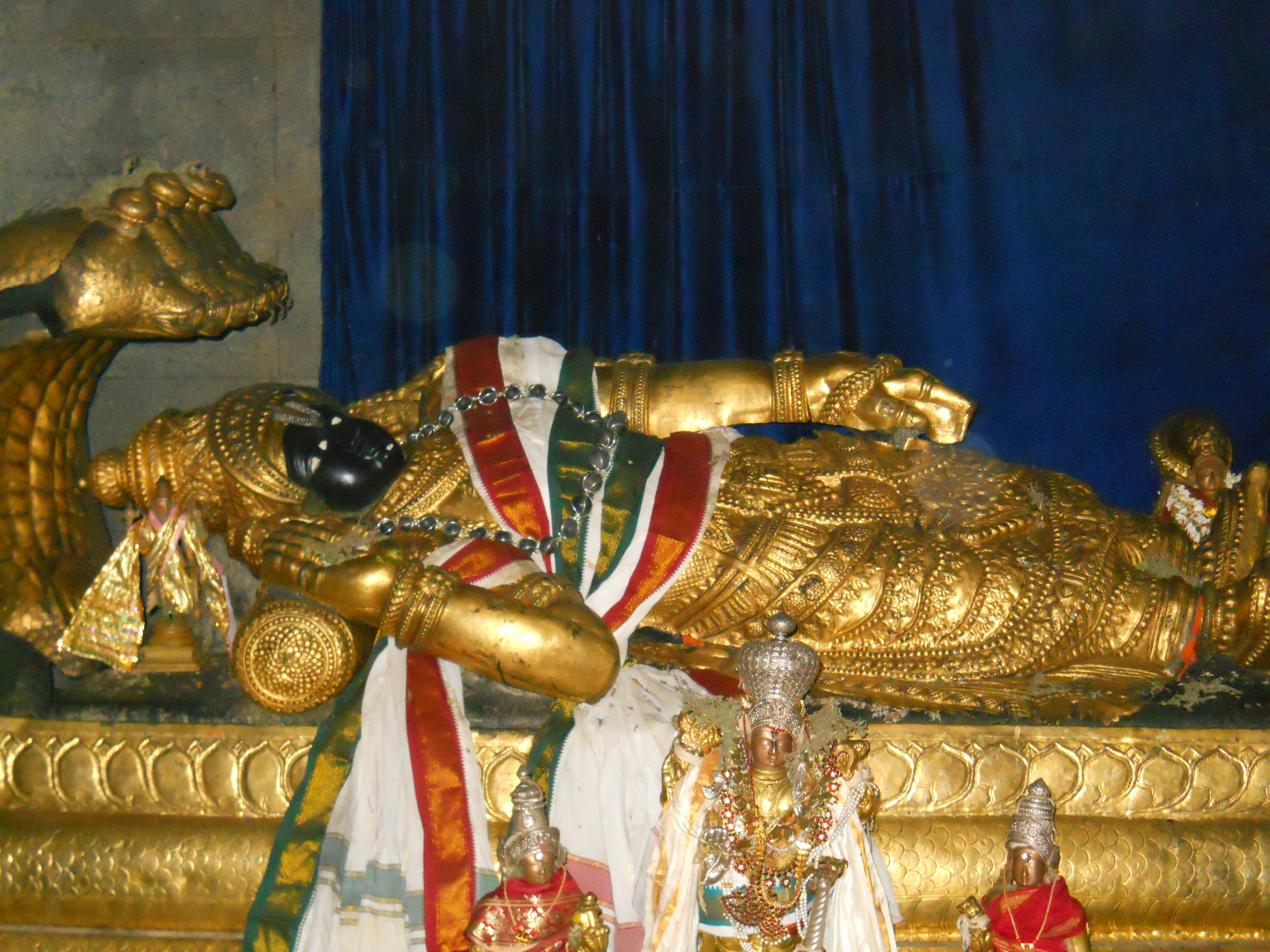

Religion
- Affiliation: Hinduism
- District: Chamarajanagar district

Location
- Location: Shivanasamudra
- State: Karnataka
- Country: India
- Interactive map of Sri Ranganthaswamy temple, Shivanasamudra
- Coordinates: 12.27045°N 77.16961°E

The Sri Ranganthaswamy temple in Shivanasamudra, Kollegala taluk, Chamarajanagara district, Karnataka, India is a temple dedicated to the Hindu God Ranganatha, a manifestation of Vishnu. While there are numerous Ranganatha temples in South India, and many of those are located along the banks of river Cauvery, there are three temples within the islands that are formed within the river itself. The temple is one of a such three major temples that are built on three different islands on the River Kaveri, the others being those at Srirangapatna and Srirangam.

Shivana Samudra is 85 km from Mysore and 115 km from Bangalore. Sri Ranganathaswamy Temple located here is built in the Dravidan style of architecture. Sri Ranganathaswamy here is also referred to as "Madhya Ranga", who is highly revered by Sri Vaishnava devotees among others. Among the three forms of Ranganatha, the deity here is believed to represent the youthful form of the supreme being and hence is also fondly referred to as 'Mohana Ranga' and 'Jaganmohana Ranga'. Madhyranga is an ancient temple housing a beautiful idol, yet being located remotely sees few visitors. It sees fairly a good number of visitors over weekend. The temple has recently started renovation of the temple which is beginning in feb 2021.

Temple forms part of the famous tri ranga pilgrimage, where the three ranga temples, built on three naturally formed islands of kaveri, are visited on a single day. Other two temples being Adi Ranga and Anthya Ranga.

== Other nearby temples ==
There are three more temples in three other sides of the island.

The ancient Sri Someshwara Temple is another famous temple here at Shivanasamudra. Adi guru Sri Shankaracharya is said to visited this place and has established a "Sri Chakra" in this place. Surprisingly, it is believed that the Someshwara Linga here is said to have been existing much before the Ranganantha Idol and that the Saptarshis were performing pooja and worshipping this Linga.

The Shakthi Devathe temple of Vanadurga Devi is 1 km away from the Someshwara temple.
