= Katha (storytelling format) =

Religious storytelling, performances of which are a ritual event in Hinduism

Katha (or Kathya) is an Indian style of religious storytelling, performances of which are a ritual event in Hinduism. It often involves priest-narrators (kathavachak or vyas) who recite stories from Hindu religious texts, such as the Puranas, the Ramayana or Bhagavata Purana, followed by a commentary (Pravachan). Kathas sometimes take place in households, involving smaller stories related to the Vrat Katha genre. The didactic Satyanarayan and Ramayana kathas instill moral values by revealing the consequences of human action (karma). For Sikhs, katha consists of pithy stories told to an audience.

== History ==
Each region of India has developed its own style and tradition of storytelling in local languages. Epics and puranas, ancient stories of wisdom told in Sanskrit, are the story material common to most regions. Performances are given in temples and at weddings and other religious (or social) functions. The single performer should be versatile in exposition and able to interestingly narrate humorous anecdotes. The storyteller is seen as a teacher who is familiar with ancient texts in Sanskrit and other vernaculars and interprets the religious and mythological texts of the past to the present generation.

South India has a long tradition of storytelling and religious discourse. Religious scholars, such as Oduvars, were knowledgeable in the scriptures used for discourse in temples and monasteries; in Tamil Nadu, this was known as Kathaprasangam. The 17th-century Arunachala Kavi, the 19th-century Gopalakrishna Bharathi, Maha Vaidyanatha Iyer and Ramalinga Swami, and the 20th-century Nellai Sundaramurty Oduvar, Kripananda Variar, and Pulavar Keeran were Kathaprasangam experts.

Scholars such as Suki Sivam and Trichy Kalyanaraman perform in this style. The interpretation of a shloka depends on individual musical ability. Pravachan, Patakam, Upanyasam, Harikatha, Kalakshepa, Harikeerthan and Villupattu are interpretations and storytelling with a religious theme, in different styles.

Wall paintings in temples and shrines across India also served the same purpose. The propagation of Hinduism and the creation of awareness in worshippers of the characters of the deities were aided by katha with imagery in temples.

As per Lutgendorf, only two texts were still widely performed in katha style in Hindi-speaking north India in the early 1980s—the Bhagavata Purana and the Ramcharitmanas of Tulsidas—with the exposition of the Sanskrit Purana apparently in decline while that of the Hindi epic flourished. Such Mānas-kathā consists of slow, systematic recitation of the text interspersed with prose explanation and homely illustration, performed by an expounder (vyās) before a devotional assembly (satsaṅg). Lutgendorf notes that Tulsidas never calls his own work a "book" but always styles it a kathā, using the word some 180 times in the course of the epic.

== Traditions ==
There are three major katha traditions: Purana-Pravachana, Kathakalakshepa and folk narratives.

=== Purana-Pravachana ===
Purana-Pravachana (expounding the Puranas) is a pravachan: a lecture about scriptures in which the pauranika (pravachan pandit) is a spiritual interpreter of the scriptures. Pravachans generally have a religious theme, usually the life of a saint or a story from an Indian epic.

It is easier to listen to a pandit or purohit who is conducting a Pravachan to understand some of the scriptures. Pandits such as Paruthiyur Krishna Sastri elaborate on the significance of a shloka or scripture they read, providing several angles to look at a verse or word. Upanyasa or Pravachanas focus on Sanskrit and Tamil texts. Music is used sparingly to recite the shlokas. Reading the shloka and presenting its meaning is the method used by pravachan pandits. The 19th-century Paruthiyur Krishna Sastri provided interpretation and commentary for each verse; creating a new style, he is considered the father of pravachans. Pravachan, Patakam and Upanyasam can be synonyms for the narration of stories from epics and puranas and the interpretation of scriptures.

=== Kathakalakshepa ===
Stories with anecdotes, known as Kathakalakshepa, are told in Sanskrit, Tamil, Marathi, Telugu, Kannada and Hindi. In a variant, a storyteller proficient in classical music, interweaves the main story with music, dance and digressions.

Harikatha is a composite art form combining storytelling, poetry, music, drama, dance and philosophy. In harikatha, a story is intermingled with related songs. The music may be congregational singing of Jayadeva's Ashtapadis, Narayana Teertha's Carnatic music, Tevaram, Naalayira Divya Prabhandham, Thiruppugazh, Annamacharya's kirtan, Bhadrachala Ramadasu, Tyagaraja and Purandara Dasa's padas.

=== Folk narrative ===
In Andhra Pradesh, folk narratives are known as burra katha. A burra is a drum shaped like a human skull (burra means "skull"). In this tradition, travellers narrate stories while beating the drum. In Tamil Nadu, folk narratives are known as Villu Paatu (bow songs); the stories are told accompanied by a stringed instrument resembling a bow. The stories are heroic ballads, and the medium is used to propagate social-welfare programmes such as AIDS awareness, family planning and election information. Kanian koottu and Udukkadipattu, prevalent in South Indian villages, are also folk storytelling traditions.

== Performers ==
From 1870 to 1940, storytelling flourished in Tamil Nadu, Karnataka, Andhra Pradesh and Kerala. Tanjavur Krishna Bagavathar (1841–1903) sang with Paruthiyur Krishna Sastri (1855–1911) during his early Katha performances. Krishna Sastri later performed only pravachans with minimal music. Krishna Bagavathar continued his Kathakalakshepam and introduced Marathi metric forms, which became the standard for the next 50 years.

The carnatic singers Soolamangalam Vaidyanatha Bagavathar (1866–1943), Mangudi Chidambara Bagavathar (1880–1938), Chitrakavi Sivarama Bagavathar (1869–1951), Soolamangalam Soundararaja Bagavathar (1890–1925), C. Saraswathi Bai (1894–1974) and N. S. Krishna Bagavathar (1892–1984) were all inspired by Krishna Bagavathar's style and technique. Pandit Lakshmanacharya, Tiruppazhanam Panchapakesa Sastri, Mannargudi Sambasiva Bhagavatar, Tanjavur T.N. Subramanya Bhagavatar and T.S. Balakrishna Sastrigal specialised in Harikatha. Andamin Sivarama Bhagavatar, Pandit Lakshmanacharyar and Tiruppazhanam Panchapekesa Sastri, Kalakkad Muthuswami Sastrigal, Sengalipuram Muthanna Vaidhyanatha Dikshithar, Samartha Ramadas Swamigal, Paruthiyur Krishna Sastri and Sengalipuram Anantarama Dikshitar were Pravachan and Upanyasam storytellers. After this period, storytelling became popular in North India.

Ramakrishna Paramahamsa, Swami Vivekananda and Swami Dayananda Saraswati later presented discourses, and Dushyanth Sridhar has become popular. Present-day storytellers include satire, humor and music and can convey a message in several languages. Many of them play an important part in the religio-social life of India.

== In Sikhism ==
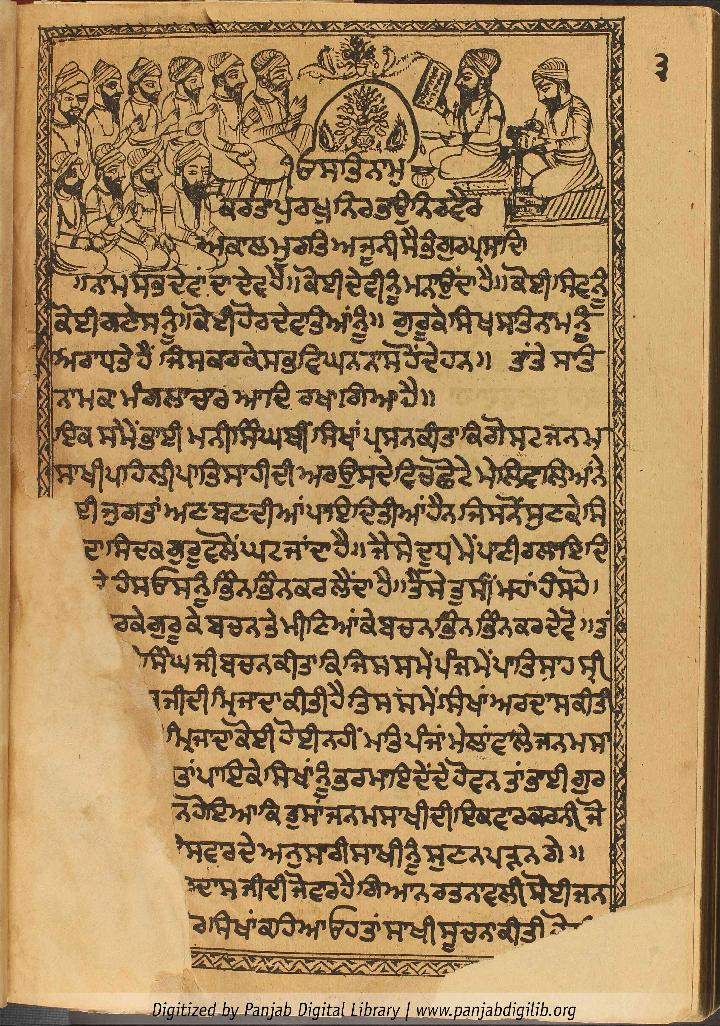
Artwork from 'Pothi Janam Sakhi' showing Shaheed Bhai Mani Singh performing Katha whilst the Sikhs students are recording

In Sikhism, Katha (Punjabi: ਕਥਾ; Kathā) refers to a sermon, religious discourse, analysis, or exposition of a given text and its passages, which is verbal in form. The term refers to religious discourses focused on educating the congregation on the proper meaning of the teachings set-out in the Sikh scriptures and other texts to guide correct beliefs and practices.

The Sikh tradition of katha formally traces back to Bhai Gurdas, who was ordained by Guru Arjan to expound upon a verse from the Adi Granth, which he had been the scribe of, on a daily basis to the Sikh congregation in a brief and concise manner. Later, the masands, which had been appointed by the Sikh gurus, were instructed to perform discourses on Sikh texts, beliefs, and practices to their local parish. Later, Guru Gobind Singh had appointed Bhai Mani Singh to perform katha. Not only are the main canon of Sikh texts analyzed, but also other historical texts related to Sikhs, such as the Suraj Parkash and Panth Parkash.

The one who delivers a katha to a 'listening, devotional congregation' (sangat) is known as a kathavacak (literally, a "reciter/speaker of katha").

== See also ==
- Satsang
- Burra katha
- Panchatantra
- Sengalipuram Anantarama Dikshitar
- List of chief ministers of Madhya Pradesh
