= Pancha Rama Temples =

Hindu temples in Tamil Nadu, India

The Pancha Rama Temples are five Hindu temples of Rama in Tiruvarur district, Tamil Nadu, India.

== Location ==
All these temples are in Tiruvarur district. Pancha means five. They are located in Mudikondan, Adambar, Parutthiyur, Tillaivilagam and Vaduvur. Likewise there are also Pancha Krishna Temples and Pancha Ranga Temples dedicated to Vishnu.

- Sri Kodhanda Ramar Temple, Mudikondan
- Sri Kodhanda Ramar Temple, Adambar
- Sri Ramar Temple, Paruthiyur
- Sri Kodhanda Ramar Temple, Thillaivilagam
- Sri Kodhanda Ramar Temple, Vaduvur
