= Kothandaramar Temple, Adambar =

Religion
- Affiliation: Hinduism
- District: Tiruvarur
- Deity: Lord Rama

Location
- Location: Tiruvarur
- State: Tamil Nadu
- Country: India

Architecture
- Type: Dravidian architecture

Kothandaramar Temple is a Hindu temple located in the Tiruvarur district of Tamil Nadu, India, dedicated to Rama, the seventh avatar of Vishnu. The temple is glorified by Valmiki and classified as one of the 108 Abhimana Kshethrams of the Vaishnavate tradition. This temple one of Pancha Rama Kshethrams. All these temples are said to be particular locations mentioned in Ramayana.

== Location ==
It is located in the village of Adambar in Nannilam taluk. It is located at a distance of 3 km from Achuthamanalam.

== Presiding deity ==
The presiding deity is known as Sri Kodhanda Ramar. There are also Sita, Lakshmanan and Hanuman.

== Speciality ==
Very near to this location there are Ramayana related places such as, Thadakanthapuram, Nallamankudi, Valangaiman and Kollumangudi.

== Religious significance ==
This temple is one of the *Pancha Rama Kshetras and considered the foremost among the five temples. Pancha means five and Kshetrams refers to holy places. All the five temples are situated in Tiruvarur district, Tamil Nadu.

- Sri Kodhanda Ramar Temple, Mudikondan
- Sri Kodhanda Ramar Temple, Adambar
- Sri Kodhanda Ramar Temple, Paruthiyur
- Sri Kodhanda Ramar Temple, Thillaivilagam
- Sri Kodhanda Ramar Temple, Vaduvur
