= Kothandaramar Temple, Thillaivilagam =

Hindu temple in Tamil Nadu dedicated to Rama

Coordinates: 10.412733°N 79.553403°E

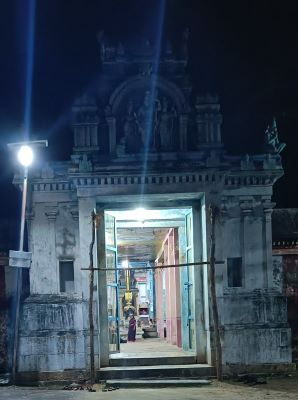
- Kothandaramar Temple, Thillaivilagam

- Location within Tamil Nadu

Religion
- Affiliation: Hinduism
- District: Tiruvarur
- Deity: Lord Rama

Location
- Location: Tiruvarur
- State: Tamil Nadu
- Country: India
- Interactive map of Kothandaramar Temple, Thillaivilagam

Architecture
- Type: Dravidian architecture

Kothandaramar Temple is a Hindu temple located in the Tiruvarur district of Tamil Nadu, India, dedicated to Rama, the seventh avatar of the god Vishnu. The temple is glorified by Maharishi Valmiki and classified as one of the 108 Abhimana Kshethrams of the Vaishnavate tradition. This temple one of Pancha Rama Kshethrams. All these temples are said to be particular locations mentioned in Ramayana.

== Location ==
It is located in the village of Thillaivilagam in Thiruthiraipoondi taluk. It is located at a distance of 20 km from the town of Thiruthuraipoondi.

== Presiding deity ==
The presiding deity is known as Kothandaramar and also Veera Kothandaramar. There are also Sita, Lakshmanan and Hanuman.

== Speciality ==
Hanuman with four feet height, in standing posture, is the speciality of the temple. We can even see the vain on lord Rama's feet, also the Arrow end is different from the others.

== Religious significance ==
This temple is one of the Pancha Rama Kshetrams and considered the foremost among the five temples. Pancha means five and Kshetrams refers to holy places. All the five temples are situated in Tiruvarur district, Tamil Nadu.

- Sri Kodhanda Ramar Temple, Mudikondan
- Sri Kodhanda Ramar Temple, Adambar
- Sri Ramar Temple, Paruthiyur
- Sri Kodhanda Ramar Temple, Thillaivilagam
- Sri Kodhanda Ramar Temple, Vaduvur
