= Kothandaramar temple, Paruthiyur =

Religion
- Affiliation: Hinduism
- District: Tiruvarur
- Deity: Rama and Sita

Location
- Location: Tiruvarur
- State: Tamil Nadu
- Country: India

Architecture
- Type: Dravidian architecture

Kothandaramar Temple is a Hindu temple located in the Tiruvarur district of Tamil Nadu, India, dedicated to Rama, the seventh avatar of the god Vishnu. The temple is glorified by Maharishi Valmiki and classified as one of the 108 Abhimana Kshethrams of the Vaishnavate tradition. This temple one of Pancha Rama Kshethrams. All these temples are said to be particular locations mentioned in Ramayana.

== Location ==
It is located in the village of Paruthiyur in Kudavasal taluk.

== Presiding deity ==
The presiding deity of the temple is Varadarajar. The temple is famed as Paruthiyur Rama Temple. Kothandaramar is facing south. Rama is along with consort Sita, and Lakshmanan and Hanuman. 'Paruthiyur Periyava' *Shri Krishna Sastri, who had made pilgrimage throughout India also sang the praise of Rama in this temple. He rebuilt this temple; as it is very old and dating to the time of Ramayana.

== Other shrines ==
Shrines of Varadharajar, Mahalakshmi, Visvanathar and Visalakshi are found in this temple. Like Thillivilagam temple, one can worship both Siva and Vishnu in this temple.

Paruthiyur Publications, "Sarvam Rama Mayam", is the life history of Brahmasri Paruthiyur Periyava Ramayanam Shri Krishna Sastri and the book elaborates the sthala puranam of this temple.

== Religious significance ==
This is a special prathana sthalam for vedic pundits, discourse scholars, music and namasangirtan artists. This temple is one of the *Pancha Rama Kshetras of Thiruvarur District.

- Sri Kodhanda Ramar Temple, Mudikondan
- Sri Kodhanda Ramar Temple, Adambar
- Sri Kodhanda Ramar Temple, Paruthiyur
- Sri Kodhanda Ramar Temple, Thillaivilagam
- Sri Kodhanda Ramar Temple, Vaduvur
