= Aragalur =

- city
- Interactive map of Aragalur
- Location in Tamil Nadu, India
- Coordinates: 11.560762°N 78.788624°E
- Country: India
- State: Tamil Nadu
- District: Salem
- Elevation: 500 m (1,600 ft)

Population (2001)
  - Total: 3,478

Languages
  - Official: Tamil
- Time zone: UTC+5:30 (IST)
- PIN: 636 101
- Telephone code: 04282
- Vehicle registration: TN 27 & TN 30 & 77

Aragalur ("six moat place") is a village in Salem district, Tamil Nadu, India. It is about 6 km from Thalaivasal and 70 km from Salem.

== Etymology ==
Aragalur literally means "six moat place" or the village having six moats. The moats were historically located near Kuyavar Street, Pullaakulam (North), Soleswaran Temple, Kottikulam (North), Kavarai Street & Uppulimedu. One of the records suggest that the moats could have been in concentric circles. Most of the moats have been filled and flattened to keep up the population growth.

== History ==
Aragalur (Arakalur / Aragaloor / Aragazhur) was the capital of Magadai mandalam ruled by the well known Bana chieftains around 1190-1260 CE. Aragalurudaiya Ponparappinan Rajarajadevan alias Magadesan was the greatest in this dynasty. Pallava inscriptions say, Chief Vanakovaraiyan Rajarajadevan Vannenjan alias Vannenja, a subordinate of Kopperunjingadeva - Kadava dynasty, lived in Aragalur around 1254 CE. The chief at Aragalur also has a family title of 'Ponparappinan'- referring to the gilding of the central shrine of the Arunachaleswara Temple at Tiruvannamalai and 'Bana' the clan / family title. Aragalur Udaya Iraratevan Ponparappinan had refurbished most of the parts and rebuilt some parts of Thillai Nataraja Temple, Chidambaram in 1213 AD . This dynasty ruled at the same period as Kulothunga Chola III, and Jatavarman Sundara Pandyan I. Pandian won over Magadesan in 1251 CE but returned the kingdom back. Magadesan ruled Aragalur without being subordinate and hence was captured and kept at Sankagiri fort. Magadesan's insignia was Rishabha the sacred Bull and the Garuda the sacred eagle and his elephant was called Airavata.

== Government ==
Village Panchayat election 2020 brought onboard President VIJAYAN

== Politics ==
Aragalur is part of the Gangavalli (SC) State Assembly seat and Kallakkurichi (SC) Parliament seat. There are more scheduled castes and scheduled tribes constituencies near Aragalur. State ST: Yercaud, Sendamangalam & Uppiliapuram. State SC: Thalaivasal, Perambalur, Veeraganur, Tittagudi & Ulundurpettai. Parliament SC seats: Rasipuram, Perambalur & Chidambaram.

== Geography ==
Vasishta Nadi carries the drainage of Kalrayan Hills and flows through Attur, Thalaivasal and Cuddalore district with check dam at Pakkampadi and Periyeri / Aragalur border. This river flows in Tiruchirapalli and joins Sweta Nadi before flowing into the Bay of Bengal. Vasishta Nadi flows on the north and east part of the village. The Eri (agriculture reservoir - diverted from river) feeds many parts of the wet lands. Other areas are feed by and deep open wells or borewells tapping the aquifer. There is also a concern that the ground water table is going down in this region due to excessive exploitation of ground water for agriculture.

=== Neighborhoods ===
Anna Nagar Santhu, Bazaar Street, Meenavar Street, North Street, Boyar Street, Theepetty Colony, Marriyamman Kovil street, Velippalaiyam, Palaiya Colony, West Colony, East Colony, Kattukottaikal, Tharodum Street, Kavarai Street, Kottai Street, Kuyavar Street, Solisvaran Kovil Street & Mannathi Street. As an elder put, this village is very well organized based on the labor skills that they provided. It can also be seen as segregation based on caste system.

Regions include: Agraharam, Raja Vedi, Valayalkara theru, Kottai (Fort?) Street, Vannara Street & Cheri.

Microsoft; Nokia. "Aragalur" (Map). Bing Maps. Microsoft.

== Economy ==
Aragalur is primarily an agriculture village. Cattle (Cow, Buffalo, Goat, and Chicken) are grown for the milk, meat, leather and as working animal. Also as a hub for the neighboring villages, the village Sandhai (Farmers' market) is held on the Wednesday. There, you can get the fresh farm produce sold mostly by the farmers themselves. The market street has small businesses that cater to the daily needs of the population. There are private medical practitioners and a veterinarian to take care of the people and the large cattle population. The Village is ATM Facility Available in 24 Hours at 3 ATMs available on this area and two petrol bunk also available.

== Transportation ==
The mode to reach Aragalur is by taxi from Thaliavasal or Attur. Alternatively, you can also reach it by a bus from Attur/Thalaivasal that runs approximately once every hour.

- chinnasalem to tirupathi bus available at (5:30 pm and 8 pm at chinnasalem, 5:20 am at tirupathi).

Nearest railway station: Thalaivasal (TVSL) and Chinna salem.

=== Train ===
The Chinnasalem town's railway station serves trains on the route to Mettur, Cuddalore, Nagore, Pondicherry, Salem, Coimbatore, Mangalore, Bangalore, Chennai and Mumbai.

- Salem to Vriddhachalam passenger
- Bangalore to Karaikkal Fast passenger
- Salem to chennai egmore to dadar express
- Puducherry to Mangalore weekly express
- Yeshwantpur (Bangalore) to Puducherry garib rath
- Erode to chennai egmore special daytime intercity express

Aragalur is landlocked and depends on the Port of Chennai for most oceangoing freight.

Nearest airport is Salem Airport (IATA: SXV – ICAO: VOSM) which is 70 km away.

early morning 8:10 am aragalur to chennai bus facility available, every night 09:30pm aragalur to chennai bus facility available Early Month Theipirai Ashtami Yester Night Boojai... at the day Morning to Night 3 Am regular bus facility at attur to aragalur

== Communication ==
Indian Postal Service operates a Sub-Office (636 101) at Aragalur. There is a telephone exchange catering to the land line telephones. Recently the usage of mobile phones has increased in the village and shops selling them are available.

== Education ==
Educational institutions include

1. Sri Venkateswara Matric & HR.Sec.School
2. Bharathi Vidya Mandir Matriculation School

Tagore Educational Institutions

1. Panchayat Union Elementary School
2. Government Boys Higher Secondary School
3. Government Girls High School

Nearest Colleges

1. Maha Barathi Engineering College
2. Kailash Women's College
3. Bharathiyar Women's Engenering college of Education

== Demographics ==
People of Aragalur are predominantly of Hindu faith speaking Tamil language. There is a significant number of Sengunthar community who are primarily weavers. This village has many temples including Sri Kamanada Eswar and Solesvara (Ashlar walls)- dedicated to Lord Shiva and Karivarada Raja Perumal dedicated to Lord Vishnu. There is also a 6-foot-tall (1.8 m) Buddha idol and a 3 ft idol in the village of Thiyaganur on the outskirts of the Aragalur.

== Flora and fauna ==
Lake fed areas are cultivated with rice and cotton, while the dry lands are more suitable for peanuts (groundnuts) and cassava. Coconut is one of the common tall trees. The eri is planted with trees to retain the soil and also retain water due to improved cover from hot sun. The wild animals in this area include lizards, crows, sparrows and rarely rabbits. கறிவேப்பிலை karivepallai, Curry Tree, was introduced in the early 2000s in and around Aragalur.

== Tourism ==
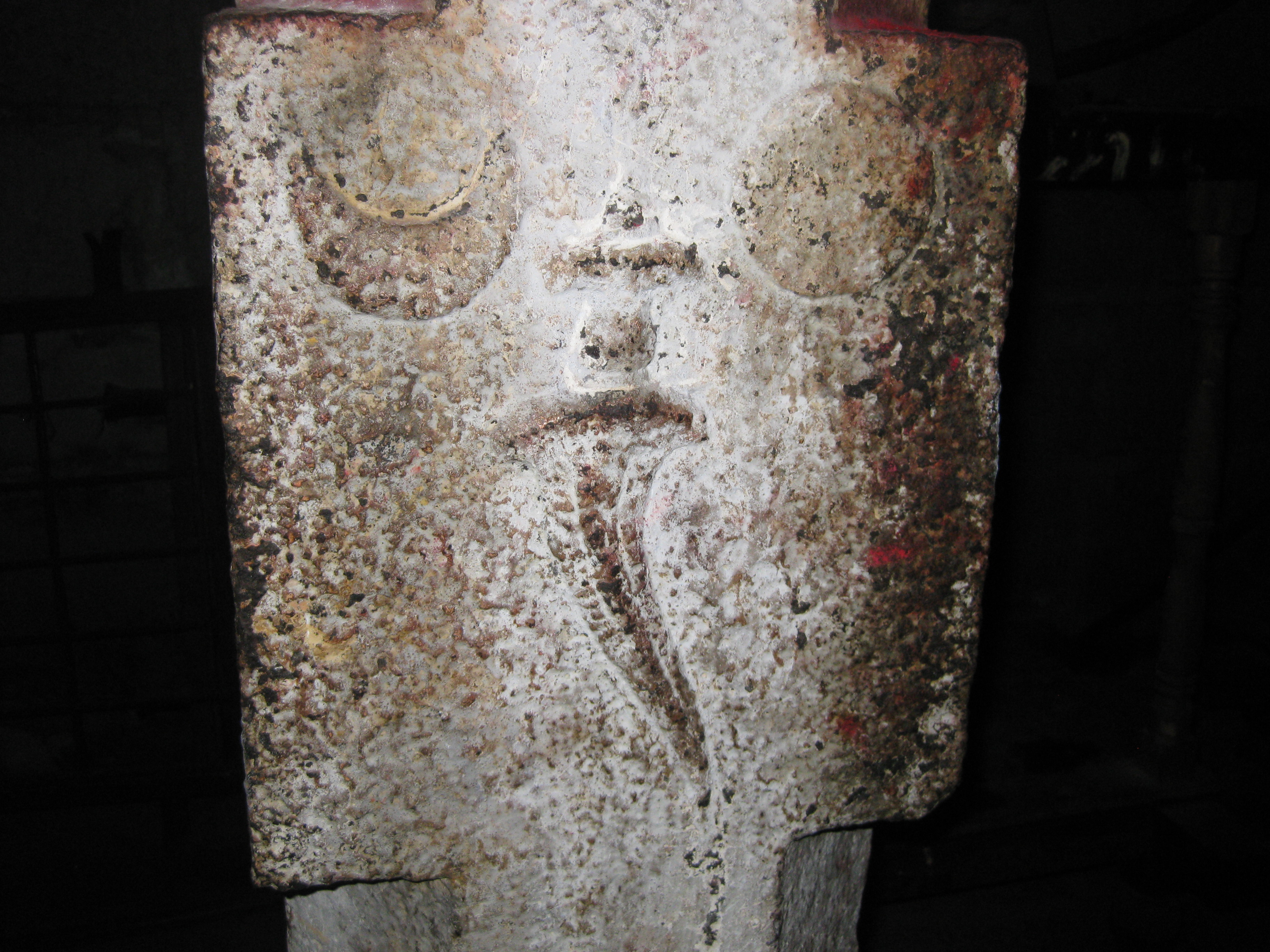
Royal Insignia of the Vijayanagara Empire the sun, moon and the dagger - on a pillar at Sri Kamanada Eswar temple. Same insignia can be viewed in Karivaradha Perumal Temple as well.

Temples are primary attraction and few select days in the year are special for each of the big temples. Taking the god for a tour in the evening happens on auspicious occasions around the Raja Vedi. Aragalur celebrates many festivals like Pongal where the friends and relatives of nearby villages are invited.

Shiva: Bhairavar puja is celebrated in a grand way at the Sri Kamanada Eswar temple 11.562717°N 78.788238°E on the 8th day after the new moon day (Ashtami) at midnight. This is probably the only temple having like this Bairavar pooja in Tamil Nadu. On the day before Panguni Uthiram, morning sun-ray directly falls on the Lingam and is worshiped at this time by small number of traditional local families. This next occurs on 12 April 2014 6:00 am to 6:30 am IST. This temple has a Temple tank, though dry for most part of the year. Kameshwara temple stala Purana indicates that the Kamadeva woke up Siva at this place. There is a village named Kaamakkaapaliyam in this locality. Sri Kamanada Eswar temple was built prior to 1206 CE and hosts many Epigraphs of historic and Archaeological importance and it is maintained by Tamil Nadu Government Hindu Religious & Charitable Endowments ministry. The epigraphs were collected by the British Raj in 1931CE and numbered it 408 - 455. Bhirava pooja here is recent phenomena - since 17 September 1993CE, and it is getting very popular and the village bustles with transient business, including Aragalur traditional Paniyaram dish. The vimana is of 3 levels and it has Temple tank. Saint Vashistha, is believed to have worshipped the shiva Linga here.

Aarudhra Darisanam is celebrated in December each year (Tamil month of Margazhi on Tiruvathira).

Ashta Bhairavar icons installed at Aragalur are : Asitanga, Kala, Kapala, Krodha, Rudra, Ruru, Samhara & Unmatta.

Vishnu: Rajaraja Vanar Kovaraiyan built Karivaradha Perumal Kovil (Vishnu) 11.562402°N 78.789074°E in the 12th century that is facing West. There are nice Dasavatara murals with the 9th avatar as Budha. This temple has a Temple tank having water. Its water is not used or minimally used for the ritualistic activity. This is parrikara sthalam for the people with stars Uthiradam, Thiruvonam, Avittam & Moolam. The vimana is of 3 levels and it has Temple tank.

Both the Sri Kamadada (consort's temple pillar) and Karivaradha Perumal (roof) temples have the sun, moon and the dagger Royal Insignia of the Vijayanagara Empire embossed on the granite wall/pillar.

Solesvaran Temple: 11.562002°N 78.787401°EThis temple gives the old name for the village as 'Thayinum nalla chozhiswaram'. The temple is constructed using Granite stones with no mortar. There is one inscription in the temple, Nandi in separate Mandapa. There is another small temple for the goddess adjacent to the Solesvaran temple and the construction is similar to the mail temple. Locals believe that this was constructed by/in honor of Kulothunga Chola III. In 2007, volunteers have cleared the vegetation over growth on the roof of this temple.

Subrahmanyan temple in the Market street (Kadai Veedhi) celebrates Soora Samhaaram every year on the 6th day of Karthika lunar Tamil month.

Ambairamman temple 11.571147°N 78.788109°E, on the Vasishta Nadi, has 2 Vinayakars that's not as common.

Temple cars: (Donated by Eramanchi Tulukanna Nayaka 1518 under Vijayanagara Empire ruler Krishnadevaraya) in ruins - not maintained.

Buddha temple: The Buddha 11.56093°N 78.779955°E temple and Buddha statues found in the neighboring village Thiyaganur are alternative attractions to visitors.

There are 21 temples for the population of this village.

Bronze Jain statues were present in this village. They are probably moved to Salem museum.

There are couple of restaurants that provide basic food to the locals and tourists. For accommodation, Attur is the nearest desirable place.

There are 12 Siva temples located on villages through which Vasishta Nadi flows. These include the panchaboodhas (Five Classical Elements or Tattva worshipped by Vashistha Rishi: Belur Thandodreswarar (land), Ethapur Sambavamoortheswarar (water), Attur Kottai Kayanirmeshwarar (Fire), Aragalur Kamanadeshwarar (Air) & Koogayur Swarnapurieswarar (Sky).
