= Kothandaramar temple, Vaduvur =

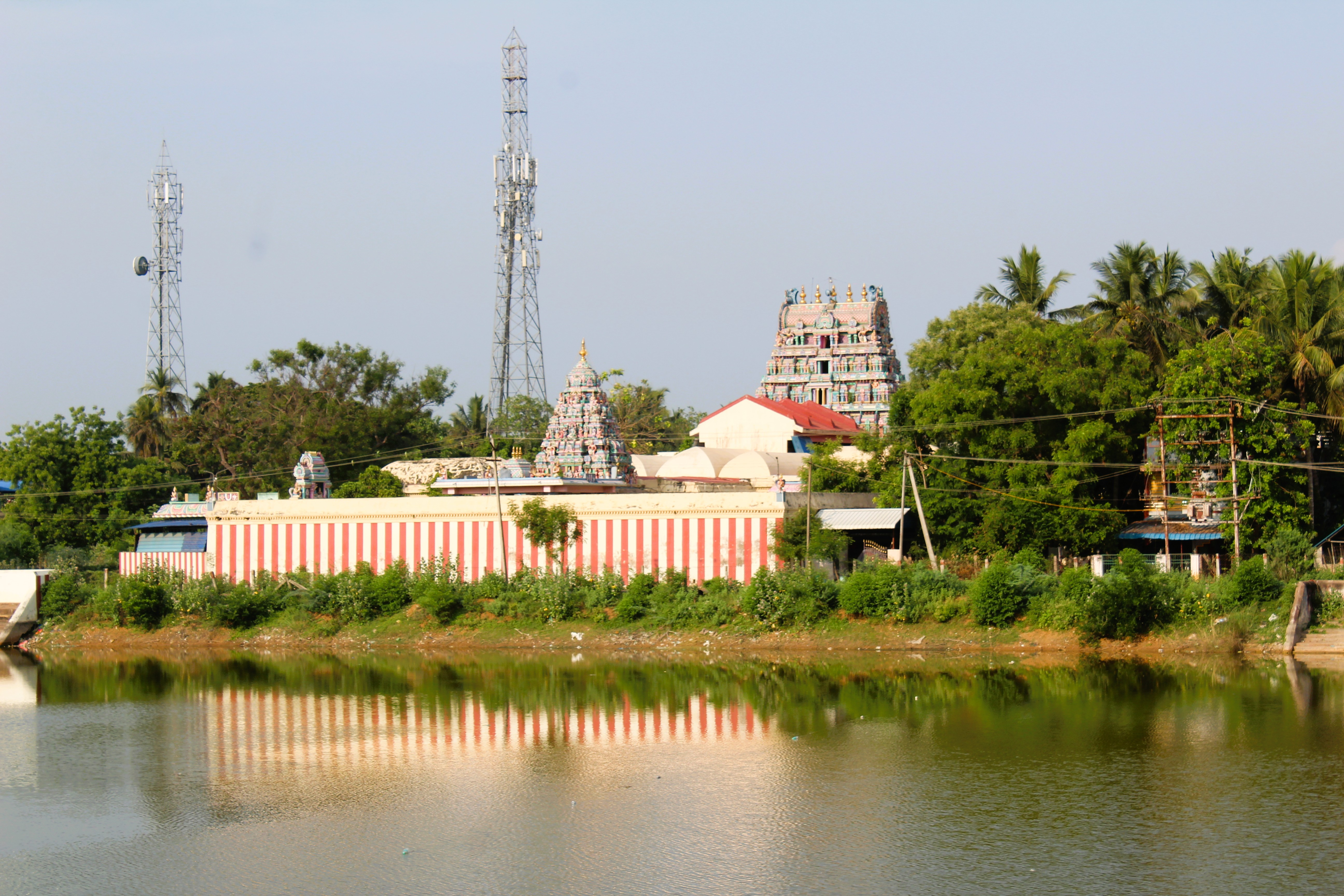

Religion
- Affiliation: Hinduism
- District: Tiruvarur
- Deity: Lord Rama

Location
- Location: Vaduvur
- State: Tamil Nadu
- Country: India

Architecture
- Type: Dravidian architecture

Kothandaramar Temple is a vaishnava temple located in Vaduvur, Tiruvarur district of Tamil Nadu, India, dedicated to Rama, the seventh avatar of the god Vishnu. The temple is glorified by Maharishi Valmiki and classified as one of the 108 Abhimana Kshethrams of the Vaishnavate tradition. This temple is called as the Dakshina Ayodhya(Ayodhya of South India). This temple one of Pancha Rama Kshethrams. All these temples are said to be particular locations mentioned in Ramayana.

== Location ==
It is located in the village of Vaduvur in Thanjavur-Mannargudi road. This temple is also known as Dakshina Ayodhya.

== Presiding deity ==
The presiding deity of this temple is known as Kothandaramar. He is found with Sita, Lakshmana and Hanuman. The utsava moorthy of Rama in this temple is very famous for its beauty.

== Other shrines ==
In the prakara, shrines of Hayagriva, Viswaksena, Andal and Alvars are found in this temple. In the front mandapa, another form of Vishnu Krishna with the name of Venugopalan is found in a separate shrine with Rukmani and Satyabama. Krishna was earlier the central deity of the temple before Rama. Sarayu theertham is found outside the temple. The vimana of this temple is known as Pushpaka vimana.

== Origin of the Temple ==
The idol of Rama and family was found inside a forest (hidden underground) by Raja Serfoji of Thanjavur Maratha clan. On his way to Thanjavur, he took rest under a tree where he heard the chant of Jai Shri Rama coming from the ground when he dug up the earth he found the idol of Rama, Sita, Bharata, Lakshmana, Shatrugana and Hanuman. The people of the nearby villagers banned the exit of idols from the village. So the King ordered the statue of Bharata and Shatrugana be placed instead of Rama and Lakshmana for worship in the village temple. The villagers constructed a temple with Bharata as Rama and Shatrugana as Lakshmana with the new Sita Devi statue. When the procession of idol neared Vaduvur area they took rest. In the dream of Maratha King, Rama appeared and told the king to place the statues in the nearby Krishna Temple. The Maratha Raja built the Sarayu tank and renovated the temple.

== Religious significance ==
This temple is one of the *Pancha Rama Kshetras and considered the foremost among the five temples. Pancha means five and Kshetrams refers to holy places. All the five temples are situated in Tiruvarur district, Tamil Nadu.

- Sri Kodhanda Ramar Temple, Mudikondan
- Sri Kodhanda Ramar Temple, Adambar
- Sri Ramar Temple, Paruthiyur
- Sri Kodhanda Ramar Temple, Thillaivilagam
- Sri Kodhanda Ramar Temple, Vaduvur

== Festivals ==
Rama Navami, Garuda Seva and car festival are celebrated in a grand manner. The ther (festival car) of the temple is the second largest after the car of Rajagopala swamy's ther in mannargudi. The villagers of vaduvur namely vadapathi and thenpathi rely on this temple during the great car festival. Each vadam (the rope of the car) is pulled vadapathi and thenpathi villagers which makes the festival more famous around the district. vaikunta egathesi is a festival where all the villagers of vaduvur wait for the grand feast on the egadhesi day after worshiping vaduvur ramar.
