= Vasishta Nadi =

Location
- Country: India
- State: Tamil Nadu
- Region: Salem District

Physical characteristics
- Mouth
  - elevation: 0 ft (0 m)

Vasishta Nadi, named after the Hindu sage Vasishtha, originates from Salem district, flows through Kurchi, Belur, Yethapur, Pethanaickenpalayam, Attur, Kattukottai, Manivizhundhan North between South, Deviyakurichi, Pattuthurai, Thalaivasal, Aragalur, Sitheri and Cuddalore district. This river flows in Cuddalore and joins Sweata Nadi before flowing into the Bay of Bengal. Dams on the river are located at Attur and Periyeri. Check dams are constructed at Attur, Thalivasal and Periyeri/Aragalur.

Like many seasonal rivers in Tamil Nadu, soil erosion is a major concern for many parts of this river due to legal/illegal extensive sand mining for concrete.

The Vellar system consists of the Vasishta Nadi and Sweata Nadi, which drain two parallel valleys running east and west in Attur taluk, former carrying off the drainage of Kalrayan Hills and the latter carrying the Kolli Hills and Pachamalais.

There are 12 Siva temples located on villages through which this river flows. These include the panchaboodhas (Five Classical Elements or Tattva): Belur Sri Thanthondreeswarar , (தான்தோன்றீஸ்வரர்) (land), Ethapur Sambamoortheeswarar (சாம்பமூர்த்திஸ்வரர்) (water), Pethanaickenpalayam Arulmegu Aatkondeswarar Temple (அருள்மிகு ஆட்கொண்டீஸ்வரர் திருக்கோயில்) Attur Kottai Kayanirmeshwarar (Fire), Aragalur Kamanadeshwarar (Air) & Koogayur Swarnapurieswarar (Sky).
