= Kaamakkaapaliyam =

- village
- Location in Tamil Nadu, India Kaamakkaapaliyam (India)
- Coordinates: 11°32′47″N 78°45′19″E
- Country: India
- State: Tamil Nadu
- District: Salem
- Elevation: 500 m (1,600 ft)

Languages
  - Official: Tamil
- Time zone: UTC+5:30 (IST)
- PIN: 636 112
- Telephone code: 04282
- Vehicle registration: TN 27 & TN 30 & TN 54

Kamakkapalayam is a village (Gram panchayat) in Salem district, Thalaivasal block in the Indian state of Tamil Nadu.

Kamakkapalayam is about four kilometres south of Thalaivasal towards Veeraganur.

== History ==
Kamakkapalayam was part of the Magadai Mandalam as of 1190 AD. Probably, during the Palaiyakkarar rule, this village was named after the Kameshwara temple's moolavar Kamanathar. The other villages named after Palaiyakkarar in this area include Govindampalayam, East Rajapalayam, Ammapalayam, Thennankudipalayam, Akkicheetipalayam, Ramanayakkan Palayam and Peddanayakkan Palayam.

=== Borders ===
Aragalur, Aaraththi Akrahaaram, Thiyaganur, Thalaivasal, Deviyaakurichi, Vadagumarai, Thinkumarai, Naavazlur, Nadumedu & Veppampuundi.

Microsoft; Nokia. "Kaamakkaapaliyam" (Map). Bing Maps. Microsoft.

== Places of interest ==
1. Selli Amman Aalayam
2. Murugan Temple
3. Sivan Temple
4. Sri Amman Temple
5. Sri Selva Vinayagar Maha Sakthi Mariamman Aalayam Vedhanayagapuram
6. Kanada inscriptions on the 2 stones in the field

== Infrastructure ==
Kamakkapalayam has 2 Panchayat Union Elementary Schools and 1 Middle Class School. One Panchayat Union Elementary School at Kamakkapalayam and the other at Nadumedu. Panchayat Union Middle Class School in Vedhanayagapuram. A Primary Health Center is located at this village. The major transportation is the road connection to Thalaivasal and Veeraganur with buses running every hour.

== Notable persons ==
Tmt. V. Alagammal - member of Thalaivasal assembly constitution (93) of the 12th Tamil Nadu State general Assembly .
