= Sengalipuram =

Sengalipuram sivangalipuram Sivankalipuram
- village
- Nickname: sengai
- Location in Tamil Nadu, India Sengalipuram (India)
- Coordinates: 10.855687°N 79.505525°E
- Country: India
- State: Tamil Nadu
- District: Tiruvarur
- Block: Kudavaasal
- Sengalipuram: Sengalipuram

Population (2001)
  - Total: 3,253

Languages
  - Official: Tamil
- Time zone: UTC+5:30 (IST)
- Postal code: 612604

Sengalipuram ("Shivakalipuram") is a village situated in Thiruvarur district in the south Indian state of Tamil Nadu

Notable people from the village include Sengalipuram Muthanna, Anantharama Deekshithar and the Tamil writer "Thiru". It is one of the 18 Vathima villages.

Maha Mariyamman is one of the oldest and biggest temples in Sivankalipuram.

At the Pudhugudi entrance of the village, a Siva temple is located, and at the Sengalipuram end, a Kali temple is located. These two temples together give the name Sivankalipuram.

== Transport ==
The nearest airport is Trichy (150 km), and the nearest railway station is Thiruvarur (18 km).

== Temples ==
- Soleswarar Nistulaa ambika - Lord Shiva
- Valmiki ashram - Lord Ram; Annual Sriramanavami festival conducted during March End / Early April
- Dathathreya: It is believed by many devotees that after visiting Dathathreya the couples are blessed with a child
- Ranganathar Swamy temple with six fingers in his leg.
- Kumara Koil - Lord Muruga
- Kasi viswanthar visalakhsi - Lord Siva

== See also ==
Vathima
