= Sengalipuram Muthanna =

19th-century Indian guru

Sengalipuram Vaidhyanatha Deekshithar , also Sengalipuram Muthanna or Muthannaval (1830–1893), was a great guru from the family of Dikshitar from Sengalipuram near Paruthiyur, on the northern banks of the Kudamurutti River, in Thiruvarur District of Tamil Nadu.

Sengalipuram was "Shivakalipuram" as it is known in the Shastras, where hundreds of Dikshithar families are living for generations up to today and where great saints like Sri Muthannaval and scholars like Sri Anantharama Deekshithar were born. Sri Vaidhyanatha Dikshitar was known as Periya Muthannaval in the village while his brother Subbarama Dikshitar was called Chinna Muthannaval.

== Life ==
Sengalipuram Muthannaval was a teacher in the area and had a lot of young students in his Gurukul. Muthannaval was a Guru regarded as having patience who belived that little steps in learning go a long way. He aimed to make students comfortable so that the students would enjoy having him as their teacher and would be motivated to come to the classes each day. He created a non-threatening, welcoming environment for each of the students. He aimed to understand students and what motivates them in order to scaffold activities. He built relationships with his students as well as their parents. He was a lifelong learner.

=== Teachings ===
Muthannaval taught prose, poetry, grammar, kavyam, natakam, alankaram and Veda shastra and Vedanta. In Vedic recitals the same verses in the Four Vedas were recited in four different ways as some alphabets or accents changed. The pronunciations for each of the prayers and texts for rituals are considered very important to gain full benefit of the rituals. A generalized standard method of recitation and pronunciation of Vedic texts was derived from the ancient times. Vedic prayers were generally recited in the same way over generations, from teacher to students following certain basic rules of pronunciations and grammar. These rules are given in the Vedas themselves and in certain texts referred to as Vedangas. Every day Muthannaval trained his students to do Rama Nama and Hari Nama Sankirthanam and bhajans.

=== Disciples ===
One of Muthannaval's famous disciples was Paruthiyur Krishna Sastri. Sastri came to Muthanaval as a student at the age of 7. "Jayamangala Stothamala" (chapter 8, quoted by Pattabhirama Sastri) shows Krishna Sastri remembering his Guru Muthanna in many of the verses he had composed. Sastri's first lesson with his Guru Muthanna described in the article was from a chapter in Raghuvamsa, the great work of the poet Kalidasa, where the King Raghu performs the Vishwajit sacrifice and donates all that he has to a poor student Kaustha for paying fees to his Guru. Muthanna was happy that Sastri started the class that day and said "Like the king Raghu in the lesson, who was able to conquer Kubera, the Lord of wealth, and shower upon the poor student the amount of riches he could have never imagined, you will also amass a lot of wealth and knowledge and help many needy people". The blessings came true. Muthanna Sastri encouraged him to conduct discourses in the Ramayana and presented him with a "Srimad Ramayana" book. It was with this Guru's blessings and encouragement that Krishna Sastri became the greatest exponent of the Ramayana of his time.

Krishna Sastri dedicated his Nandhi Mangala Slokas to his Guru Muthannaval. When Muthanna attained siddhi in 1893, Sastri conducted "Sri Muthanna Aradhana" every year in memory of his Guru. He performed "Soma Yagam" in Srirangam, "Adhirathram Yagam" in his Paruthiyur Kodandarama Temple along with other disciples of Muthannaval.

Another famous student of Muthannaval was Sri Sengalipuram Anantarama Dikshitar's father, Subramanya Dikshitar. He was a Śrauti scholar and also was a great exponent of the art of upanyasas (discourses) on various subjects in Hinduism. He was also the brother of Muthannaval.

=== Life style ===
Muthannaval had a noted talent in counselling and advising people. He always went out of the way to help people, speaking sweetly and kindly to everyone he came across. He was extremely patient in his dealings. Above all, his devotion to God-Bakthi was incomparable. Many people came to visit him to listen to his Dharma Sastram. He taught and prescribed them different shlokas and mantras as a remedy for their problems, never discriminating against anybody. He listened to everyone from any caste, from poor villagers to farmers and Harijans. He exhibited genuine concern to others' problems, prayed for them, and gave them whatever he could to help them. He visited temples specially to pray for others' problems. When Sastri moved out of that place these people even used to worship the soil he had trodden on. They used to come back to thank and pay their respects to Muthannaval when their problems were resolved.

=== Last years ===
Shri Muthannaval was keen on taking up Abat Sanyasam. His relations and disciples were saddened by his decision. In early 1893, Muthannaval had a brief illness. Doctors who tested him said that his pulse was good and he would recover soon. Disciples told him that Sanyasam was not necessary for him and he would recover and live long. But Muthannaval predicted that on Dhuvadasi day at around 15 hours he would die. When his wife Nagalakshmi had gone to the Kaveri, Muthannaval took Abatsanyasam. He said that if he survived and lived after Dhuvadasi day, he would leave Sengalipuram and move to Paruthiyur to live near his favourite student Krishna Sastri. But that did not happen. In the month of Thai, on Dhuvadasi day at 15 hours, as predicted by him he died at the age of 63.

Muthanna maintained great relations with his students throughout his life. He was very proud of their scholarship and achievements and he encouraged them a lot. Both the Guru Sengalipuram Muthannaval and Krishna Sastri died in the month of Thai, Krishna Paksham, Dhuvadasi day.
