= List of Solesvara temples =

The Choleswarar temples were constructed by the Chola kings. Several of these temples are included in a UNESCO World Heritage Site, the Great Living Chola Temples.

Place	Name	Built By	Built in honor of	Year built	Misc
Aragalur	Cholesvara				
Sengalipuram	Nistulaambikaa				in Tiruvarur District
Mannargudi	Choleswarar				in Pattakara St, Mannargudi, Tiruvarur District. (Chitragupta having separate Sannithi)
Tippirajapuram	Vikrama Choleswarar				near Kumbakonam
Gangaikonda Cholapuram	Gangaikonda-Choleswarar	Rajendra Chola I			
Mallasamudram	Choleswarar				Mallasamudram
Bhatkal	Choleswarar				
Sangramanallur	Choleswarar				(Kolumam), UdumalaipettaiIndia
Periyakottai	Choleswarar				
Narttamalai	Choleswarar	Vijayalaya			
Thanjavur	Brihadisvara Temple	Rajaraja Chola I			It was named as Rajarajesvaram/Peruvudaiyar kovil
Arrur	Arinjisvara	Rajaraja Chola I	Arinjaya Chola		near Melpadi, Vellore tomb shrine for grandfather
Tiruchirapalli	Vijaya Choleswara		Vijayalaya Chola		
Begur	Panchalingeswarar				(Panchalingas - Nageswara, Kaleswara, Naga- reswara, Karneswara and Choleswara.)
Aranthangi	Rajendra Choleswara		Rajendra Chola		
Sholinghur	Choleswarar				Natural lingam
Bhatkal	Choleswara				Khetapayya Narayana, Joshi Shankarnarayana
Kalandai	Adityesvara		Aditya I		
Ponnamaravathi	Rajendracholisvara				Pudukkottai District
Tirappur	Choleswaram Udaiyar				Pudukkottai District
Motupalle	Chola				Andhra Pradesh
Tholudur	Maduranthaka				Cuddalore district, Uththama Chola
Karnataka	Cholachgudi old				
Samathur	Chozheeswarar Alayam				
Vellakovil	Choleeswarar koil				In Tiruppur district.
Kannapuram	Vikram Choleeswarar koil				Near Olappalayam, Vellakoil in Tiruppur district.

Other Shiva temples built by Chola:

- Sundaresvara temple at Tirukattalai (Aditya I)
- Komganatha temple at Srinivasanallur (Parantaka I)
- Airavateswara temple at Darasuram (Rajaraja Chola II)
- Kamaparharesvara temple at Tirubuvanam (Kulothunga Chola III)
- Choleeswaram temple at Kantalai (Raja Raja Chola I)

Similar to Solesvara, there are number of temples in praise of the Pandiya kings and they are called Pandisvara.
