= Puliyankurichi =

- village
- Country: India
- State: Tamil Nadu
- District: Salem

Languages
  - Official: Tamil
- Time zone: UTC+5:30 (IST)
- PIN: 636101
- Telephone code: 04282
- Vehicle registration: TN-

Puliyankurichi is a village that belongs to Thalaivasal taluk in the Salem district of Tamil Nadu, India. It is located in the east end part of the southernmost district of Salem. It takes two hours to reach from Salem and two and half hours from Trichy.

The main occupation of the people who live there is agriculture. One of the prominent locations, is the olden Lord Eswaran temple. A part of the village is surrounded by forest with an area of about ten thousand square km.
