= Vishahareswara Temple =

Shiva temple in Tamil Nadu, India

Religion
- Affiliation: Hinduism
- District: Tiruvarur
- Deity: Lord (Shiva)

Location
- Location: Thiruvarur
- State: Tamil Nadu
- Country: India
- Geographic coordinates: 10°52′41.4″N 79°30′47.5″E

The Vishahareswara Temple is a temple to Shiva in Thiruvarur district, in the Indian state of Tamil Nadu. The temple was built in the early 9th century in the village of Kodandaramapuram, which later became part of Avanam Paruthiyur. It is situated on the banks of Kudamurutti River, a distributary of the Kaveri. The presiding deity of this temple is a form of Shiva called Vishahareswarar, and his consort Prasanna Parvathy Devi. The temple is an ancient heritage symbol. The temple is one of the 108 Shiva temples on the banks of the Kaveri that, by legend, were built by Chola king Aditya I.

The temple is administered by the Hindu Religious and Charitable Endowments Department, where it is known as Arulmigu Visakaraswarar Swamy Temple.

== Mythology ==
Once Rahu approached with his mouth agape to eclipse the Sun, he became angry when he saw its burning rays. He began to emit poisonous breath in his serpent form, blackening the face of the Sun.

Having lost his glorious face by Rahu's poisonous breath, the Sun sought the favor of Lord Shiva and worshiped him on the northern banks of the Kudamurutti River, a tributary of the Kaveri, under a Bilwa Tree. First Goddess Parvathy Devi blessed the Sun, and then Lord Shiva joined her and the divine couple blessed him. Lord Shiva relieved the Sun of the evil effects of Rahus's poison and the Sun regained his charm and brightness. Rahu then felt remorse for his actions and begged Lord Shiva's pardon.

The Shiva temple commemorates Shiva blessing the Surya. The temple hosts Shiva as Vishahareswarar, which means "poison remover", along with Prasanna Parvathi Devi.

== Festivals ==
The temple is open to the public mornings and evenings. Shivarathri is celebrated there. The poison of a snake is said to be ineffective there. Though there are many snakes and cobras in the village, no snakebites or poison attacks have been reported. It is believed that worshiping Shiva & Parvathy there relieves the evil effects of Rahu, Kethu and Mars, and also finalizes marriages. Parithi means the Sun. Since the Sun worshiped Lord Shiva, this holy place got the name Parithipuram. People with poisonous bites and deadly diseases come from distant places to pray to Vishahareswarar.

== History ==
This Vishahareswara temple was built by Aditya Chola (C.E. 870–901). The Chola name for the temple was Thiru Adit Techaram. The temple was renovated and cared for by a great Shiva bhakta, Paruthiyur Venkatesha Sastri, popularly known as Annaval. Annaval spent most of his time in this temple with his parayanams of the Shiva Purana, teaching scripture, spreading bhakti and promoting Hindu Dharma. He was an authority on Saivite traditions. Annaval addressed several issues by answering the queries on Dharma Sastram and Hindu traditions, often posed to him by Vedic scholars and pundits. His authority on the administration of dharma made many legal luminaries seek advice on Hindu law. Paruthiyur Venkatesha Sastri Annaval (1770–1841), along with his brother Paruthiyur Sri Krishna Sastri Ayyaval (1773–1860), were the brothers of Paruthiyur and for the Hindu Religion. The great exponent of the Ramayana, philanthropist and Pravachan Pioneer Bramasri Paruthiyur Krishna Sastrigal (1842–1911) renovated this Vishahareswarar Temple and did Kumbhabhishekham in 1905. After renovations initiated in 2003 and construction of Rajagopuram, Kumbhabhishekham took place in 2017.

== See also ==
- Shiva Purana
- Shiva
- Paruthiyur
