= Ellupanatham =

Elupanatham
- Gram panchayat
- Location in Tamil Nadu, India Elupanatham (India)
- Coordinates: 11.479172°N 78.734552°E
- Country: India
- State: Tamil Nadu
- District: Salem

Government
  - president: Rajavel [Ellupanatham Panchayat]
  - MP: Pon. Gautham Sigamani Kallakurichi (Lok Sabha constituency)
  - MLA: A. Maruthamuthu Gangavalli (State Assembly Constituency)
- Elevation: 576 m (1,890 ft)

Population (2001)
  - Total: 1,834

Languages
  - Official: Tamil
- Time zone: UTC+5:30 (IST)
- PIN: 636 116
- Telephone code: 04282
- Vehicle registration: TN 27
- Website: www.salem.tn.nic.in/aprofile.htm

Elupanatham or Ilupanatham is a village gram panchayat in Salem district, Thalaivasal block in the Indian state of Tamil Nadu, about eight kilometres south of Thalaivasal.
