= Thanthondreeswarar Temple, Belur =

Hindu temple in Tamil Nadu, India

Coordinates: 11.7077°N 78.4045°E

Thanthondreeswarar Temple

Religion
- Affiliation: Hinduism
- District: Salem District
- Deity: Lord Shiva as Thanthondreeswarar
- Festival: Maha Shivratri
- Governing body: Hindu Religious Charitable Endowment Department

Location
- Location: Belur
- State: Tamil Nadu
- Country: India
- Interactive map of Thanthondreeswarar Temple

Architecture
- Type: Tamil Architecture In this village old name=thiruvelviur
- Creator: Paranthaka Chola
- Completed: 12th century AD

Sri Thanthondreeswarar Temple or Sri Thanthondrieswarar Temple is at Belur in the Indian state of Tamil Nadu.

The temple was built by the Cholas kingdom in the 12th century AD. The main deity is Lord Thanthondreeswarar (Lord Shiva) and the female deity is Goddess Dharmasamvarthini.

Thanthondreeswarar Temple is located on the banks of Vasishta Nadi (Vasishta River).

This temple comes under the Hindu Religious Charitable Endowment Department.

== History ==
The inner sanctum was constructed by 'Milagu Chetty' and the rest were constructed by King Paranthaga Chola (Paranthaka Chola). Construction of Rajagopuram was started during the 12th century by King Paranthaka Chola, but was left incomplete.

It also showcases the Tamil architecture and is representative of the Chola Empire's Ideology and the Tamil civilisation.

=== Legend ===
Manickam Chetty, a pepper merchant was living near a village close to the temple. His job was carrying loads of pepper and selling it in the market place. One day he was crossing this dense forest where the shrine is located at present. As darkness sunk in, he wanted to take rest. In order to eat, he crushed pea aubergine (Sundaikai, an edible vegetable) with a stone. Suddenly he heard a voice saying, "The stone hurts my head. Apply some pepper on my head. Bewildered by this incident, the merchant said that he did not have any pepper and added that he had only Black Gram (Ulundu). Next day he proceeded to the market place and opened his baggage. He was shocked to find black gram instead of pepper. He worshipped God and prayed for His forgiveness. God asked him to bring some mud from the place where he had crushed pea aubergine (sundaikai) and spray it in the baggage containing black gram. He followed His instructions and black gram transformed into pepper again."

On his way back, out of curiosity, he examined the place where he took rest. He was surprised to find a Suyambu Lingam (Lingam which originates by itself from earth). He worshipped the Lord and it is believed that the inner sanctum of the temple was built by him. Henceforth he was called Milagu Chetty (Milagu means Pepper) and the place where pepper transformed into black gram is called Ulundurpettai. The place has retained its name since then. As per history the inner sanctum was constructed by Milagu chetty and the rest was constructed by king Paranthaga chola. This has been mentioned in the book "The Manual Of Salem District in the Presidency of Madras" by Lee Fanu and the same idea has been endorsed by Dr. Busnagi Rajannan, a History professor.

Le Fanu, Henry (1883). A Manual of the Salem District in the Presidency of Madras. Kessinger Publishing. ISBN 978-1-4367-3939-9.

== Rajagopuram ==
The Rajagopuram is about 97 feet tall having 7 stages(floors). Consecration Ceremony (Kumbabishekam) for the new Rajagopuram was performed on 24 February 2002.

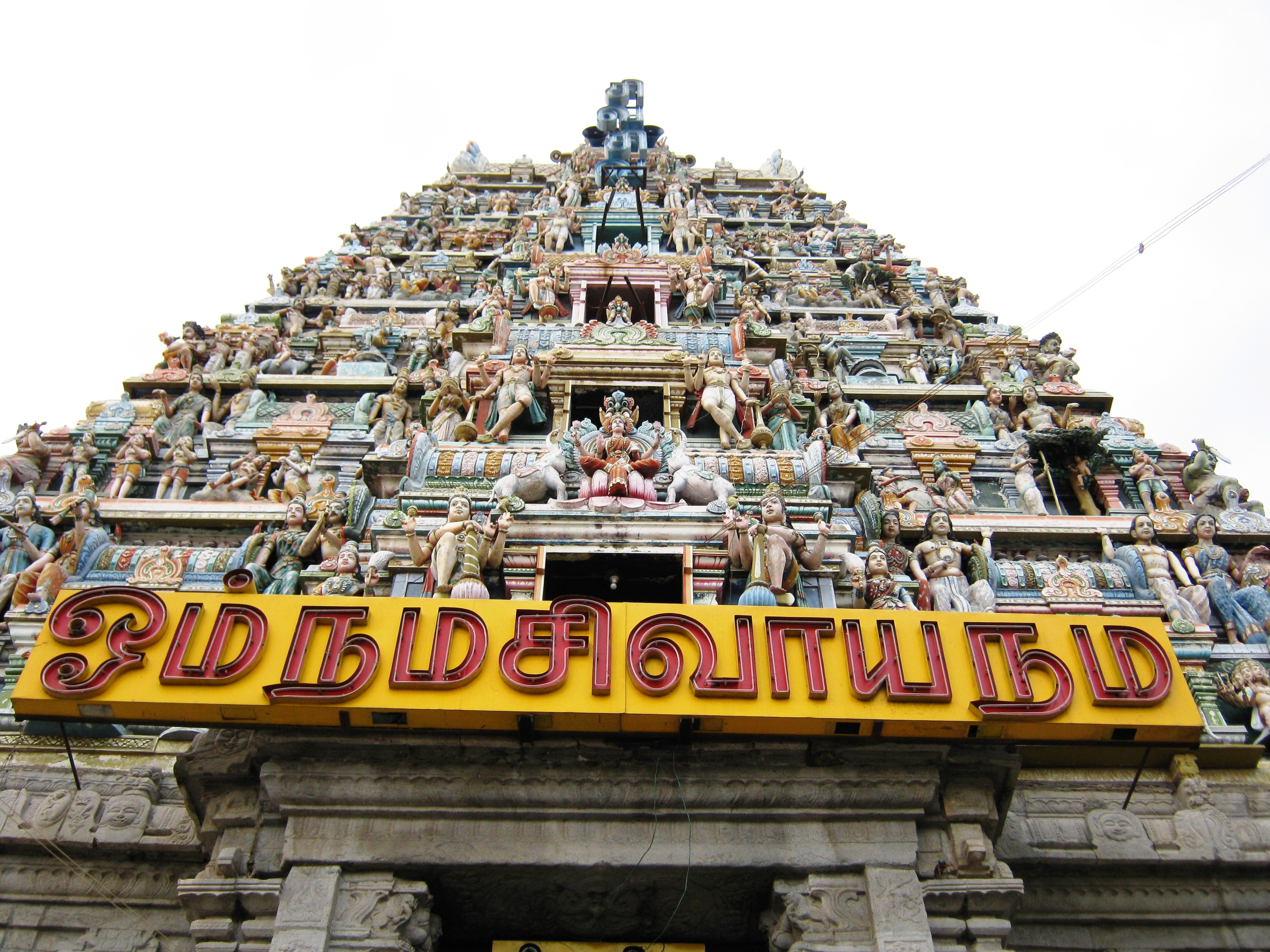
Belur Temple Tower.

== Brahmanda Purana ==
Brahmanda purana is one of the 18 puranas in Sanskrit and is written by the great saint, Vedha Vyasa. In 130th chapter of this purana, Sudamuni narrated the glory of Lord and this temple to his disciples and other saints.

== Kanampulla Nayanar ==
Kanampullar, one of the Nayanmars hailed from a rich family in this same village. He was a sincere devotee of Sri Thanthondreeswarar. He considered lighting lamps in this temple as his prime duty and did it with utmost dedication.

He went through a rough phase and lost all his wealth. Poverty drove him to Thirpuliswaram and he continued lighting lamps in a Shiva temple there. To earn his living, he used to cut a kind of grass called Kanampul and sell it in the market. He spent his meagre income on oil and wicks.

Lord Shiva decided to test his devotion. One day his grass was not sold and he did not have enough money to buy oil and wick to light the lamps. He used his locks of hair as wick in the lamp and lighted it. Extremely pleased with the supreme devotion of Kanampullar, Shiva appeared in front of him and he became one with God.

A statue of Kanampullar holding a lamp can be seen in this temple in front of Pradhosha Nandi (The Devine Bull). He is the 48th among the Nayanmars.

This adds to the pride of Belur.

== Temple’s Architectural Note ==
- The temple is constructed in such a way that every year, in the first week of Tamil month (Chithirai) the sunlight falls on the main deity in early morning.
- A structure of a mythical lion, "YAZHI" (A statue of lion) made out of a single stone with a rolling ball inside its mouth is carved on two pillars.
- A structure of Lord Shiva riding a vedhic horse is carved on two other pillars made out of a single stone.

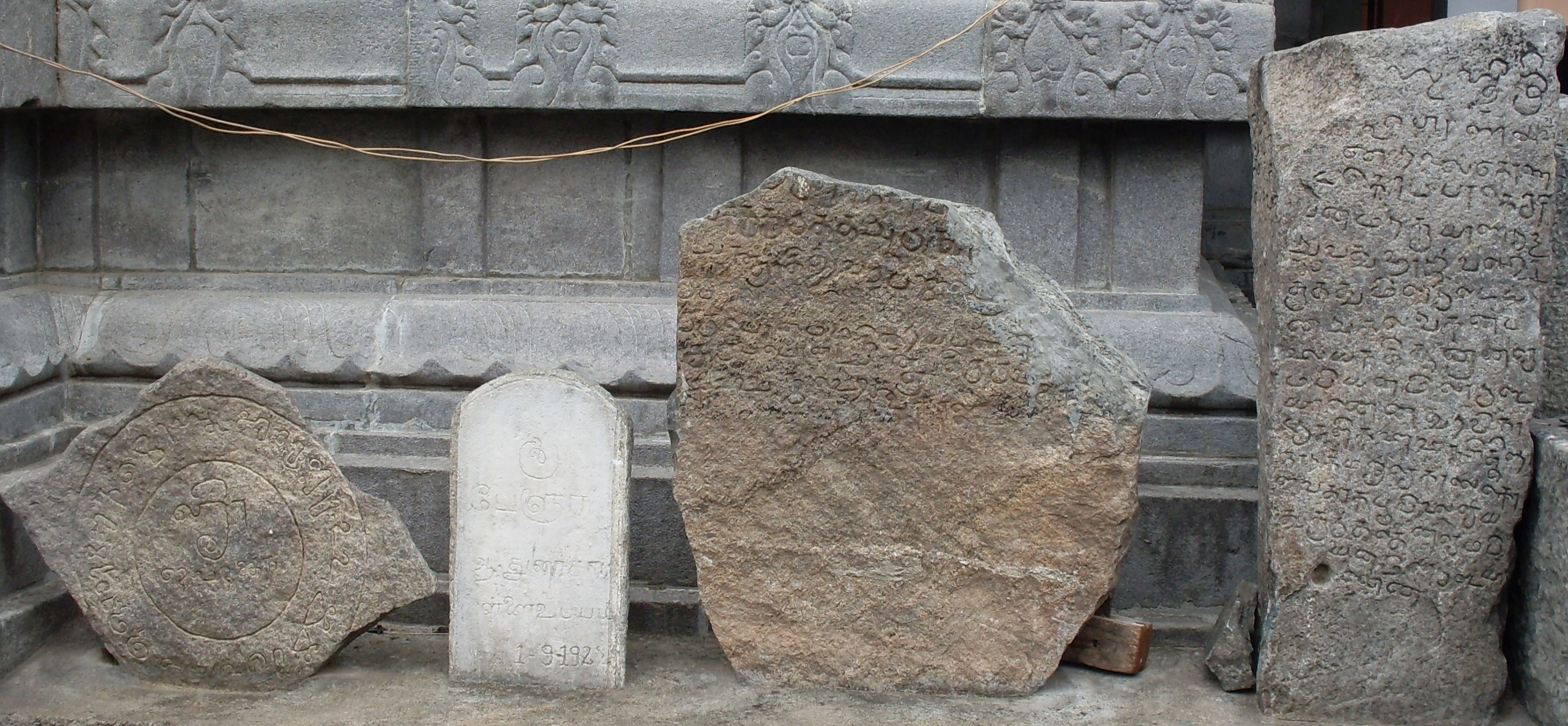
Belur Temple Scripts.

== Renovation Work ==
=== Renovation (1991) ===
The inner sanctum was renovated and four vimanas were constructed. Consecration Ceremony (Kumbabishekam) was performed in the same year.

=== Renovation (1992 - 2002) ===
Temple renovation and reconstruction of Rajagopuram was initiated in the year 1992. A local non-profit organization, "Belur Narpani Mandram" raised fund for this work. Construction of Rajagopuram and renovation of the temple was completed by 2002. Consecration Ceremony (Kumbabishekam) was performed on 24 February 2002.

== Transportation ==
Temple is located close to the Belur Bus Terminus (Approx 600 Meter from Bus Terminus).

=== Bus Route ===
Belur is 30 km from Salem city and is 6 km to the north of Valappadi, a neighbouring town.

Bus service to Belur is available from neighbouring towns Salem, Attur & Vazhappady frequently. In addition this, buses from Salem to other places like Karumanthurai, Kariya Kovil, Pappanayakanpatty, Thumbal, Pagudupatu and Arunuthumalai fly via Belur.

=== Rail Route ===
Nearest Railway Station is Vazhappady.

Everyday Chennai Salem Express (Train No 22153) starts from Chennai Egmore and arrives at Valzhappady around 5:30 AM.

=== Air Route ===
Flights from Chennai to Salem Airport fly daily operated by TruJet.
