= Pattuthurai =

Pattuthurai or Pattudurai is a village in Thalaivasal, a mandal of the Salem district of Tamil Nadu state in India. It is in Thalaivasal union and Kallakurichi Lok Sabha constituency.

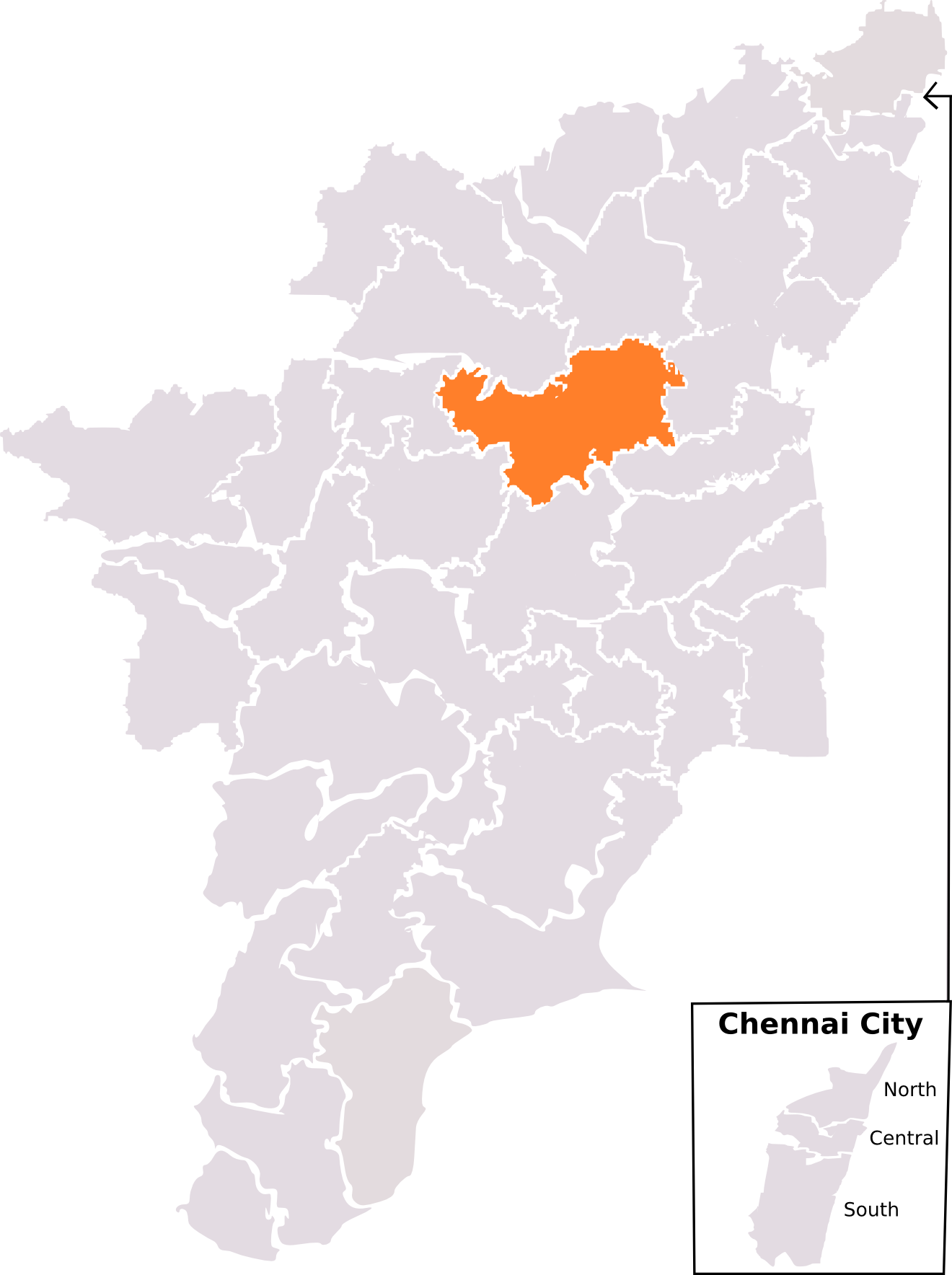
Kallakurichi Lok Sabha constituency
