= Choleeswaram temple =

10th century temple

Coordinates: 8°25′N 81°04′E

Choleeswaram temple is a 10th-century Chola Dynasty Solesvara temple built in honour of emperor Raja Raja Chola I in Peraru, Kantalai, Trincomalee District.

Inscriptions found at the ruins of this temple relate to its establishment and connection to Trincomalee's ancient Koneswaram temple. It is made in Dravidian architecture of the Chola period.

It was constructed in 1010, and is located approximately 20 km southwest of Trincomalee. In 1952, when the Colombo government began colonizing Kantalai, they discovered the temple ruins.
