= Tippirajapuram =

Coordinates: 10°55′N 79°24′E

Tippirajapuram Tippirajapurm
- village
- Interactive map of Tippirajapuram
- Country: India
- State: Tamil Nadu
- District: Thanjavur
- Taluk: Kumbakonam

Population (2001)
  - Total: 3,560

Languages
  - Official: Tamil
- Time zone: UTC+5:30 (IST)
- Postal code: 612402

Tippirajapuram is a village in Kumbakonam taluk, Thanjavur district, Tamil Nadu. It is located near the banks of the river Cauvery in India. The nearest railway station is Kumbakonam which is 8 kilometres away. Vikrama Soleswarar and Varadaraja Perumal temples are located in the village.

== Demographics ==
In the 2001 census, Tippirajapurm had a population of 3560 with 1796 males and 1764 females. The sex ratio was 982 and the literacy rate, 76.4.
