= Thiyaganur =

- Location in Tamil Nadu, India
- 11.558912°N 78.78047°E
- Location: Salem district, India

Thiyaganur is a small village in Talaivasal taluk in Salem district in the Indian state of Tamil Nadu. The major occupation of the people living at this place is agriculture. In 2011 it had a population of 2372.

== Etymology ==
The etymology of this village is not clear. "Thiyanam (meditation) oor" might have become Thiyaganur. Otherwise, "Thiyagam (sacrifice) oor" became Thiyaganur. The former may be more suitable due to the presence of early Buddhist elements present in this village.

== Location ==
Thiyaganur is located 5 kilometres (3.1 mi) southeast of Thalaivasal, 20 kilometres (12 mi) of Attur and 69 kilometres (43 mi) of district headquarters Salem.

== Transportation ==
From Attur, town buses (no: 6, 7 and 31) are available for every half an hour to reach Thiyaganur.

== About the village ==
Thiyaganur has more-than-1000-year-old heritage. The historical importance of this village comes from the presence of two Buddha statues. One statue is under worship and a temple was built recently. Dhyana mandapam (meditation center) opened in 2013.

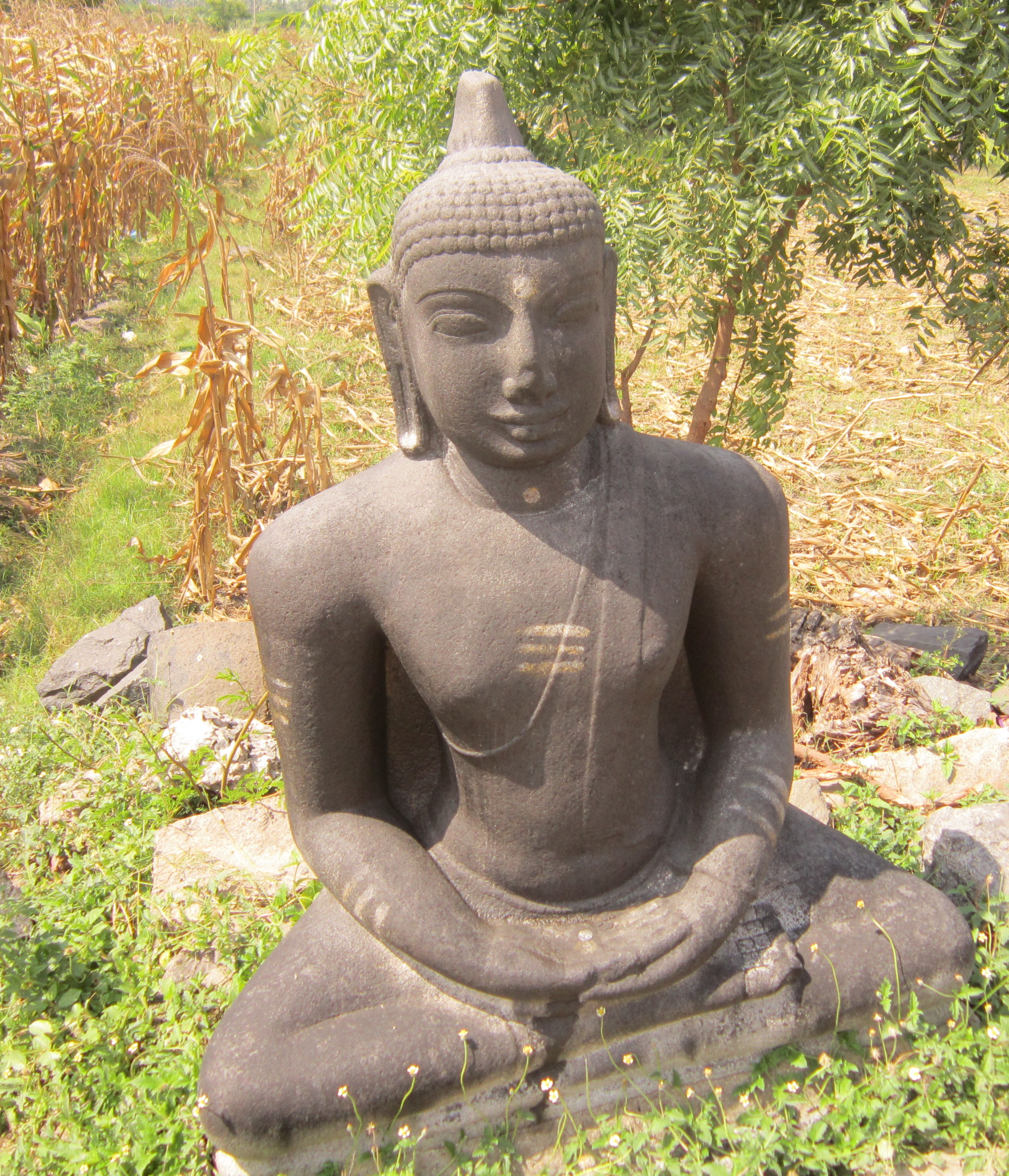
Buddha Statue 1

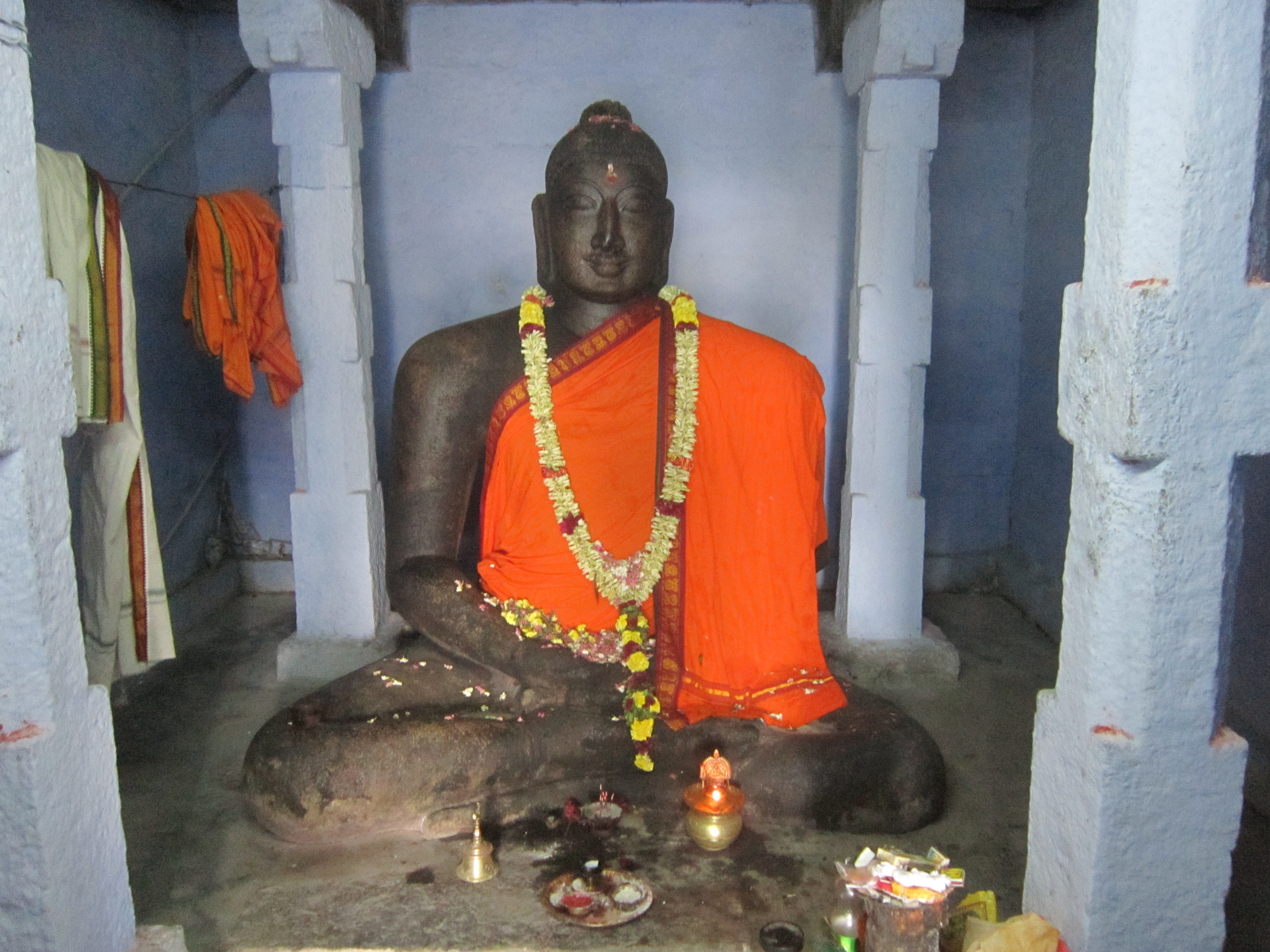
Buddha 2

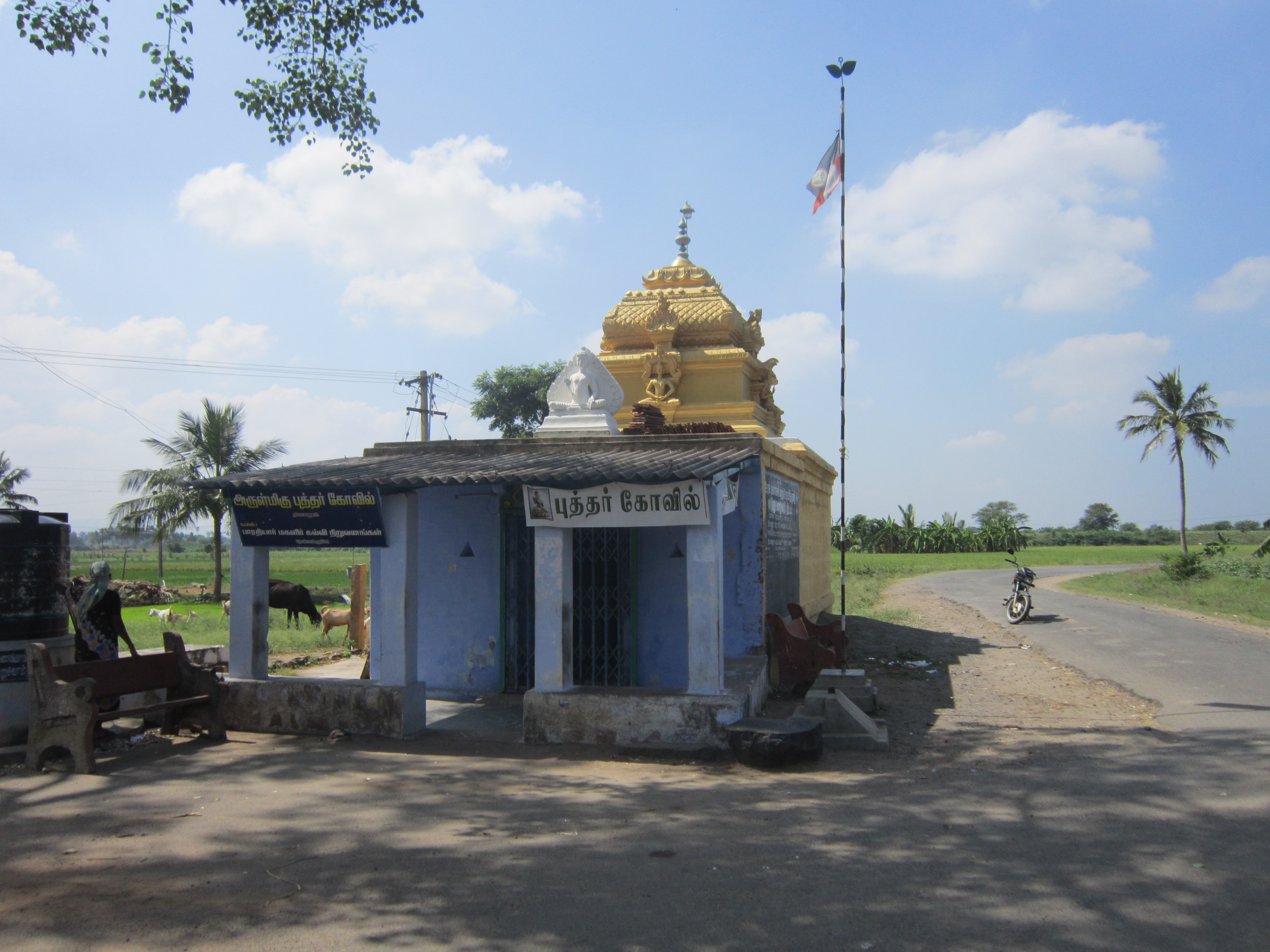
Buddha Temple
