= Vathima =

Sub-caste of Iyer community in Tamil Nadu, South India

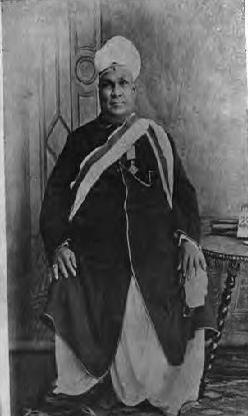
- A. Seshayya Sastri

Regions with significant populations
- Chola Nadu region of Tamil Nadu, Chennai

Languages
- Brahmin Tamil

Religion
- Hinduism

Related ethnic groups
- Iyer, Tamil people

Vathima are Iyers from Tamil Nadu, India. They belong to the Taittirīya Śākhā of the Krsna Yajurveda.

== Geographical distribution ==
Due to their geographic concentration, it is noted that they tended to be isolated and had an insular culture. They mainly reside in Tanjāvūr. Subgroups

Their subgroups are

- Udayalur ( A village in Kumbakonam Taluk, Thanjavur District)
- Nannilam ( A town in Thiruvarur District)
- Rathamangalam ( A town in Thanjavur District)
- Sengalipuram ( A village in Thiruvarur District)
- Mudikondan ( A village in Thiruvarur District)
- Semangudi ( A village in Thiruvarur District)
- Palur ( A village in Trichy District)
- Tippirajapuram (A village in Kumbakonam taluk, Thanjavur District)
- Konerirajapuram ( A village in Mayiladuthurai District)
- Puliyur ( A village in Karur District)
- Anathandavapuram ( A village in Nagapattinam district )
- Mozhaiyur ( A village in Mayiladuthurai District)
- Arasavanangadu ( A village in Thiruvarur District)
- Koonthalur ( A village in Thiruvarur District)
- Thethiyur ( A village in Thiruvarur District)
- Vishnupuram ( A village in Thiruvarur District)
- Serukalathur ( A village in Thiruvarur District)
- Marathurai ( A village in Thanjavur District)
- Manthai ( A village in Nagapattinam District)
