= Panth Prakash =

Panth Prakash may refer to:

- Prachin Panth Prakash, a historical chronicle about Sikh history in the 1700s by Rattan Singh Bhangu
- Naveen Panth Prakash, a Sikh text by Giani Gian Singh written in 1880
