= Srinivasanallur =

Srinivasanallur Seemanur
- village
- Country: India
- State: Tamil Nadu
- District: Thanjavur
- Taluk: Kumbakonam

Government
  - Panchayat President: Ilaya raja Thavamani

Population (2001)
  - Total: 1,299

Languages
  - Official: Tamil
- Time zone: UTC+5:30 (IST)
- Postal code: 612204
- Telephone code: 0435
- Vehicle registration: TN.68

Srinivasanallur is a village in the Kumbakonam taluk of Thanjavur district, Tamil Nadu, India. It won the Nirmal Puraskar award for being the cleanest village panchayat in the year 2009 and also the Saahithya Gandhi award for good governing of village. These awards were given by the president of india. Prathibha Patil to Yasodha Ramalingam, the panchayat president of Srinivasanallur,

This village is situated in the peak area where this panchayat connects by pass Between Chennai To Thiruvarur, Nagapattinam without entering the city limit This village has the Sri Yoga Anjaneyar Temple' - this temple is known for meditation, and has Panchamuga Anjaneyar statue which gives us fearless attitude and a Lakshmi Hayagreevar statue which sharpens the brain of the one who worships!

== Demographics ==
As per the 2001 census, Srinivasanallur had a total population of 1299 with 665 males and 634 females. The sex ratio was 953. The literacy rate was 76.9
