= Pravacana =

Sanskrit term

Pravacana (Sanskrit: प्रवचन) is a term for any exposition of a doctrine or treatise, or to the recitation of a scripture or text in Jainism and Hinduism traditions. It particularly refers to the tradition of Pravacanakara (monks, scholars or saints) presenting their teachings or explanations of spiritual ideas before a gathering of householders or general public in the Indian traditions. Pravacana is an ancient tradition, whose earliest mentions are found in the Vedic texts but one that is also found in post-Vedic Shastra and Sutra texts of Hindus and Jains.

== Buddhism ==
Pravacana refers to ninefold dhamma in Buddhist texts, and its recitation. It was adopted from the Vedic tradition, and sometimes referred to as Pavachan.

== Hinduism ==
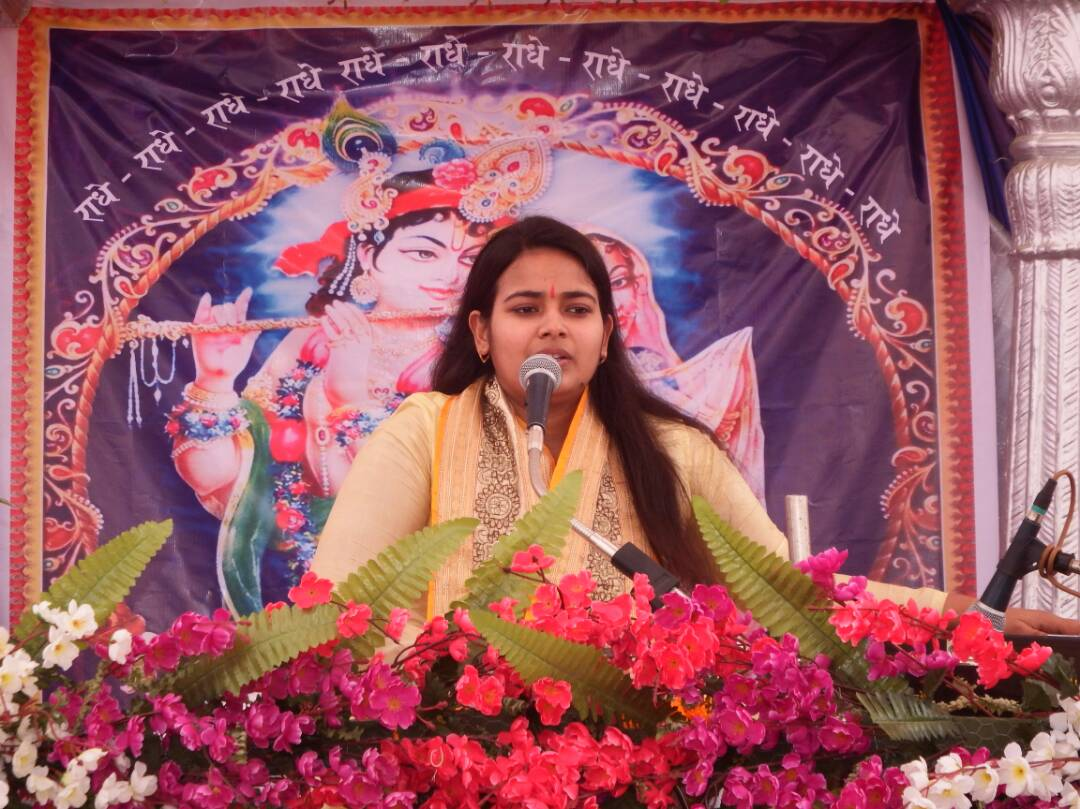
A Hindu pravacana in progress.

Pravacana (Sanskrit: प्रवचन) refers to "exposition, expounding, reciting, orally explaining, speaking or talking" about a spiritual idea or doctrine or treatise in Hinduism, particularly eloquently or excellent expression. The term is found with this sense of meaning in the Rigveda verses 10.35.8 and 4.36.1, in the sense of recitation of Vedic texts in the Yajurveda, in various Brahmanas, Gryhasutras, the Ramayana and the Mahabharata, various sutras, as well as the Puranic literature such as the Bhagavata Purana. The term typically refers to discourse, verbal discussion or a recital, but also refers to a textual genre of Indian literature that study a doctrine across texts, propound or synthesize ideas. A speaker is called Pravacanakara.

According to Rangaswami, while pravacana is teaching or recital of scriptures, it can also refer to self-recital of a text. The tradition has remained popular in contemporary times, but regionally spelled differently. For example, in Kerala, a pravacana is spelled pathakam, and generally refers to spiritual and moral-filled folklore recital such as Purana-pravacana, according to Raghavan.

== Jainism ==
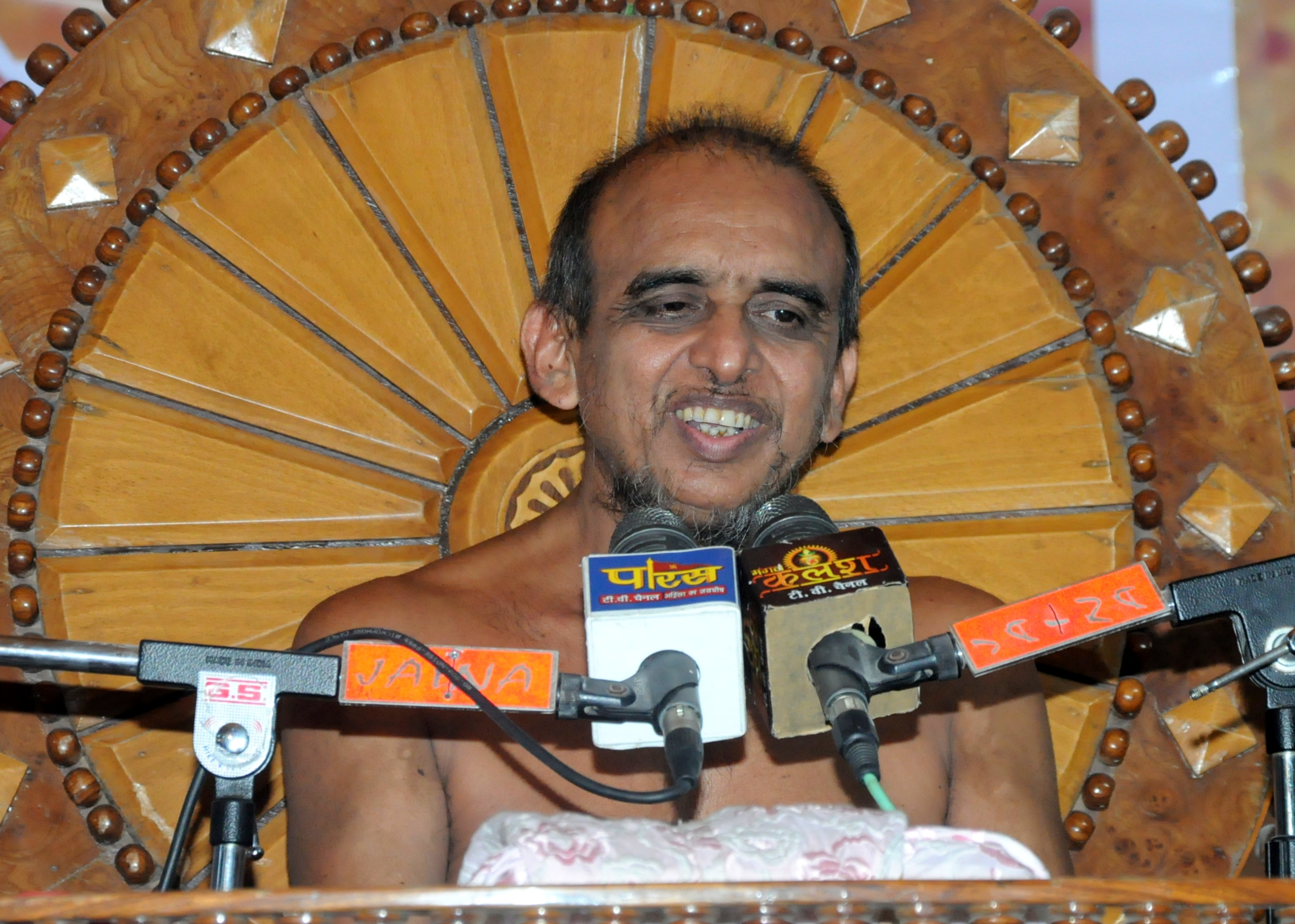
Pravachan by a Digambara monk

The word pravachan is widely used by Jains. In Jainism, the word śrāvaka is used for the householders. The word has its roots in the word śrāvana, i.e. the one who listens (the discourses of the saints).

The pravachan by Jain saints could be on Jain principles or Jain scriptures (Shastra Pravachan).

During the four-month rainy-season period, when the mendicants must stay in one place, the chief sadhu of every group gives a daily sermon (pravacana, vyakhyana), attended mostly by women and older, retired men, but on special days by most of the lay congregation. During their eight months of travel, the sadhus give sermons whenever requested, most often when they come to a new village or town in their travels.

Some Jain texts use the term Pravacana in their title, such as the Pravacana-sara by Kunda-kunda.

== Sources ==
- Cort, John E. (2001), Jains in the World : Religious Values and Ideology in India, Oxford University Press, ISBN 0-19-513234-3
