= Sengalipuram Anantarama Dikshitar =

Hindu scholar (1903–1969)

Sengalipuram Anantarama Dikshitar (Tamil: சேங்காலிபுரம் அனந்தராம தீட்சிதர்; 2 August 1903 – 30 October 1969) was a Śrauti scholar and also was an exponent of the art of upanyasas (discourses) on various subjects in Hinduism. Born in the Thanjavur district as the second son to Subramanya Dikshithar, Anantarama was initiated into the learning of the Vedas under his father Subramanya Dikshithar, the brother of Sengalipuram Vaidhyanatha Dikshithar, also called Periya Muthannaval. Paruthiyur Krishna Sastrigal was the first guru for Anantarama Dikshithar. He first had his akshara abhasya from Krishna Sastri at Muthannavals's gurukulam.

Dikshithar was the first speaker to initiate the pravachana at Veda Dharma Sastra Paripalana Sabha at Kumbakonam, an organisation that aims to revive and propagate Vedic knowledge and Dharma Sastra, started by Jagadguru Shankaracharya of Kanchi Kamakoti Peetam Chandrasekarendra Saraswati Swamigal. He wrote treatise on Mahamagham and Kumbakonam.

== Publications ==
Anantarama Dikshita produced discourses for the following scriptures:

- Srimad Bhagavata Saptaha
- Shankara Charitra
- Vishnu Sahasranama
- Ramayana
- Devi Bhagavata Purana
- Mahabharata
- Narayaniyam

He is also attributed the authorship of the following works:

- Jaya Mangala Stotra
- Sundara Kanda

== Religious significance ==
Dikshitar claimed to have been cured of his leprosy by praying to Guruvayurappan. An ardent devotee of the deity, Anantarama Dikshitar made a significant contribution to propagate the Narayaniyam of Meppattur Narayana Bhattathiri.

== See also ==
- Jayakrishna Dikshitar
