= Vaduvur =

Vaduvur Vaduvoor
- city
- Location in Tamil Nadu, India Vaduvur (India)
- Coordinates: 10.70°N 79.33°E
- Country: India
- State: Tamil Nadu
- District: Thiruvarur

Languages
  - Official: Tamil
- Time zone: UTC+5:30 (IST)
- PIN: 614019
- Telephone code: 04367
- Vehicle registration: TN 50
- Website: vaduvur Website

Vaduvur (also known as Vaduvoor) is a Tamil village situated between Thanjavur and Mannargudi in Tamil Nadu, India. Vaduvur is divided into three Punjayat for administrative purposes along the area known as Tannarasu.

Notable sites in the area include the Vaduvoor Bird Sanctuary, which is home to nearly 38 species of birds, and the Vaduvur Sri Kothandaramaswamy Temple, also known as Dakshina Ayodhya.
