= Mudikondan Kothandaramar Temple =

Kothandarama swamy Temple
- Location in Tamil Nadu

Religion
- Affiliation: Hinduism
- District: Thiruvarur
- Deity: Kothandaramar, Yogasayana Perumal, Ranganathar(Vishnu)
- Festival: Rama navami Vaikuntha Ekadashi
- Features: Temple tank: Rama theertham, Kalyana pushkarani

Location
- Location: Mudikondan,
- State: Tamil Nadu
- Country: India
- Coordinates: 10°54′9″N 79°38′35.8″E

Architecture
- Type: Dravidian architecture

Website
- mudikondan.org

Mudikondan Kothandaramar Temple is a Hindu temple in the Tiruvarur district of Tamil Nadu, India, dedicated to Rama, the seventh avatar of Vishnu.

There is an idol of Rama in the sanctum sanctorum and a shrine to Hanuman outside the sanctum sanctorum. The temple is associated with the hermitage of the Hindu sage Bharadwaja.

== Etymology ==
The village was called Magudavardhanapuri, translated into Tamil as Mudikondan, meaning the place of coronation. Rama gave dharshan to Bharadwaja as King of Ayodhya, giving the village its name.
