= Paruthiyur =

- village
- Country: India
- State: Tamil Nadu

Languages
  - Official: Tamil
- Time zone: UTC+5:30 (IST)

Parithiyur is a village on the northern banks of Kudamurutti River, near Sengalipuram, in Thiruvarur District of Tamil Nadu. It was originally called Kodandarama Puram. Buses from Kumbakonam, Nannilam, Kodavasal pass through Paruthiyur Village.

== Local legend ==
Due to the poisonous flames of Raghu, Surya, the Sun God had once lost His facial beauty. It occurred on a solar eclipse day. The Sun God prayed to Lord Siva from this place and regained His charm and brightness. 'Sun' in Tamil is called Parithi. As Parithi Worshipped here, this place came to be called Paruthiyur in colloquial usage.
