= Thalaivasal =

Neighbourhood in Salem district, Tamil Nadu, India

Thalaivasal Mummudi
- Town
- Thalaivasal, Tamil Nadu Thalaivasal (India)
- Coordinates: 11.586700°N 78.758300°E
- Country: India
- State: Tamil Nadu
- District: Salem

Government
  - Type: Taluk
  - Body: Regional Development Office/Block Development Officer
- Elevation: 187 m (614 ft)

Population (2011)
  - Total: 136,026
  - Male: 68,593
  - Female: 66,433

Languages
  - Official: Tamil
- Time zone: UTC+5:30 (IST)
- PIN: 636 112
- Telephone code: 04282
- Vehicle registration: TN-77, TN-54(Former)

Thalaivasal is a Panchayat town and Taluk in the Salem district of Tamil Nadu, India. It is located 18 km away from the Sub-district headquarter Attur and 70 km away from the Salem District Headquarter. It is one of the Taluks of the Salem District

According to the 2011 census, the total population of the headquarter panchayat is 1,35,026. The population of the Scheduled castes is 41,523. The population of the Scheduled tribe is 1,080.

== Politics ==
Thalaivasal is part of the Kallakurichi (Lok Sabha constituency) assembly constituency and Gangavalli (State Assembly constituency).
