= Nachiyar Tirumoli =

Work of Tamil Hindu literature

- ← Tiruppavai Perumal Tirumoli →
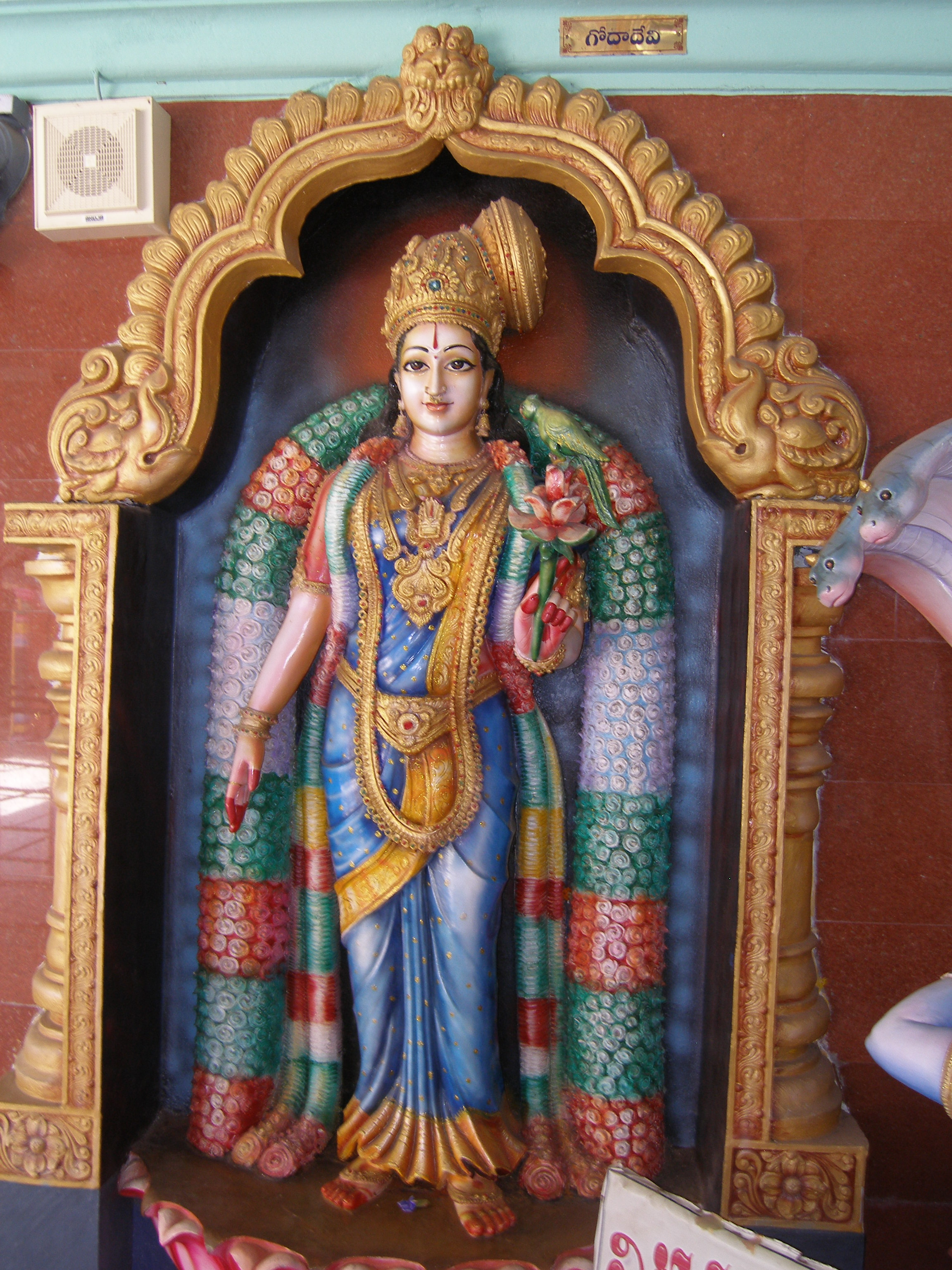
- Statue of Andal, Tirumala.

Information
- Religion: Hinduism
- Author: Andal
- Language: Tamil
- Period: 8th century CE
- Verses: 140

Nachiyar Tirumoli (transl. The Sacred Verses of the Woman) is a set of 143 verses composed by Andal, one of the twelve Alvars in Sri Vaishnava tradition in Hinduism. In her restlessness and eagerness to attain Vishnu, Andal attempts various methods by which she can attain union with him, which forms the major part of work. Among the tirumolis, Vaaranam Aayiram is very well-known and has a special significance. It details Andal's narration of her dream of her experiences with her friends on her way to achieve her purpose of birth, which is to marry Vishnu.

These 143 verses are a part of the 4,000 divine hymns of Naalayira Divya Prabandham. The verses are classified into fourteen decads, namely, a prayer to Kamadeva for marrying Vishnu, a prayer to Vishnu not to destroy a sand castle built by Andal, The stealing and returning the clothes of the Gopis done by Vishnu in his Krishna avatara, Andal securing union with Vishnu, Andal requesting a cuckoo to call Vishnu, Andal's wedding and reunion with Vishnu, Andal eulogising Vishnu's Panchajanya and Sudharshana, Andal sending clouds to call Vishnu and she successfully calls him, Andal's sadness of separation from Vishnu, Andal seeking help to attain Vishnu, and in praise of Ranganatha and Ranganayaki.

== Etymology ==
Tirumoli literally means "sacred verses" in a Tamil poetic style and Nachiyar means "woman". Therefore, the title means "The Sacred Verses of the Woman". This poem fully reveals Andal's intense longing for Vishnu, her divine beloved, whom she finally married. Utilising classical Tamil poetic conventions and interspersing stories from the Vedas and the Puranas, Andal creates imagery that is paralleled in all of the whole gamut of Hindu religious literature.

== Organisation of the verses ==
Topics in Tamil literature
Sangam Literature
Five Great Epics
Silappatikaram	Manimekalai
Civaka Cintamani	Valayapathi
Kundalakesi
Five Minor Epics
Neelakesi	Culamani
Naga Kumara Kaviyam	Udayana Kumara Kaviyam
Yashodhara Kaviyam
Bhakti Literature
Naalayira Divya Prabandham	Kamba Ramayanam
Tevaram	Tirumurai
Tamil people
Sangam	Sangam landscape
Tamil history from Sangam literature	Ancient Tamil music
Religion in ancient Tamilakam

These 140 pasurams (verses) are organized in 14 segments and each segment is called as a tirumoli. Each tirumoli deals with one specific topic. The first decad is a set of verses to pray to Kamadeva to get Vishnu as her husband. Andal expresses that she will die if she is married to someone else other than Vishnu. The second decad is a compilation of Andal's prayer to Vishnu, the preserver the sand castle she built on the Vaippar river. The third decad is the Vastrapaharana, the playful story in Vishnu's Krishna incarnation's life when he took away garments of the gopikas and then telling him to get them back, for which he gives all of them back and they wear all of it. The fourth decad has poems where she expresses her union with Vishnu. Kuyil Pattu forms the fifth decad where Andal tells a cuckoo to sing in praise of Vishnu and the cuckoo sings so. Experts attribute the verses to Pancharatra Agamas, a type of worship books used in Vaishnavite temples. The sixth decad indicates her dream to marry Vishnu according to the rituals in her and Vishnu's marriage. The eighth tirumoli called Vinneela Melappu and it deals with Andal telling the clouds in Srivilliputhur and sending them as her messenger to Vishnu, who is present in Tirupati. The remaining ninth, tenth, eleventh, twelfth, thirteenth tirumolis are dedicated to different things done by Andal to speed up her union with Vishnu which happened finally in the end. In the process, she wins finally, and finally in Patti Meindor Karerur Tirumoli, the fourteenth tirumoli, she marries Vishnu as an incarnation of Lakshmi.

== Critical analysis ==
Some of Andal's verses express love for Vishnu, written with bold sensuality and startlingly savage longing, hunger and inquiry, that even today many of her most desirous poems in Nachiyar Tirumoli are rarely rendered publicly. In one such verse, Andal dispenses with love and shows that she herself is in lying in the hands of Vishnu, and loving with him:

My life will be spared, only if he will come, to stay for me for one night, If he will enter me, so as to leave, the imprint of his saffron paste, upon my breasts, mixing, churning, maddening me inside, gathering my swollen ripeness, spilling nectar, as my body and blood, bursts into flower!

Tell him I will survive,
Only if he will stay with me,
For one day,
Enter me,
So as to wipe away,
The saffron paste,
Adorning my breasts!

(p. 140)

Andal whilst admiring herself wearing the garland which was meant for Vishnu,

The guilt glazed love lay on Andal's breasts,
Thick and heavy as him.
Frightened with force,
And locked away, she conjured him every night,
her Vishnu, her god.

My surging breasts long to leap to the touch of his hands which hold aloft the flaming discus and the bright conch!

Coax the world-measurer to caress my waist, to encircle the twin globes of my breasts!

In one of her poems, Andal says that her voluptuous breasts will swell for Vishnu alone, and hates mating with humans, comparing that with the sacrificial offerings to the deities made by Brahmanas being attempted to be violated by jackals in the forests and be driven away and completed finally, and in another verse, she dedicates her swelling breasts to Vishnu who carries a conch and a discus.

== In popular culture ==
The hymns of the Naalayira Divya Prabandham are regularly sung in all of the Vishnu and Lakshmi temples of the Indian subcontinent daily and also during festivals. Andal is also worshipped as a goddess because she is an incarnation of Lakshmi in the Sri Vaishnava tradition of the Indian subcontinent, and she is enshrined in all of the Vishnu and Lakshmi temples of the Indian subcontinent. The verses of the Tiruppavai and Nachiyar Tirumoli are sung commonly in all the households and temples during the month of Margali (December - January).

Andal's Vaaranam Aayiram is included in Ilaiyaraaja's score for Kamal Haasan's movie Hey Rama, and Andal is mentioned as one of the lyricists for this song in this movie.

== See also ==
- Kanninun Cirutampu
- Tiruviruttam
- Tiruchanda Viruttam

== Sources ==
- Dalal, Roshen (2011). Hinduism: An Alphabetical Guide. Penguin Books India. ISBN 9780143414216.
- Vankeepuram, Rajagopalan (2005). Andal's Nachiyar Thirumozhi (Love Transcendental). V.K.N. Publishers. ISBN 81-902979-1-0.
