= Tiruviruttam =

Work of Tamil Hindu literature

- ← Nanmukan Tiruvantati Tiruvaciriyam →
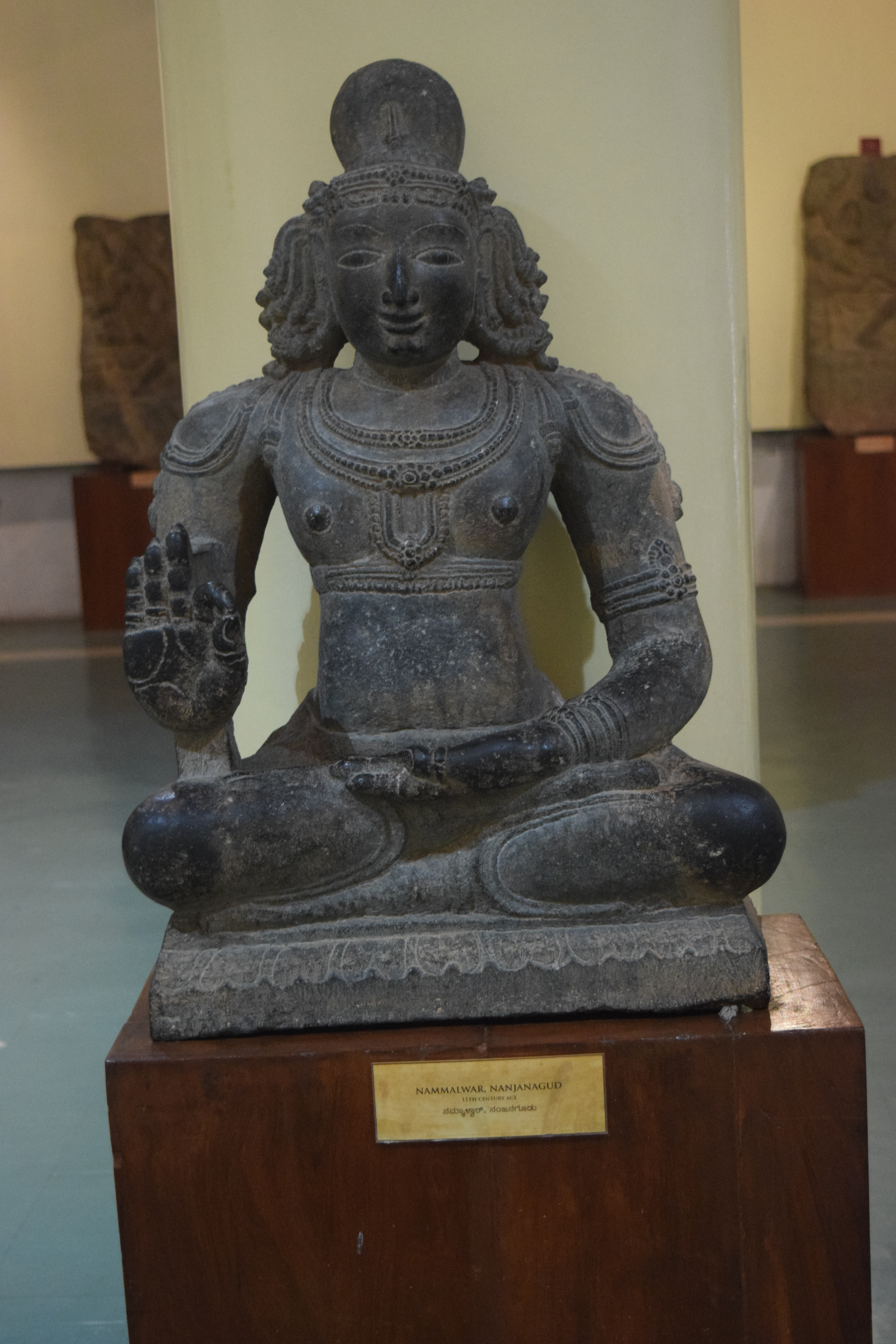
- Figurine of Nammalvar, the author of this poem.

Information
- Religion: Hinduism
- Author: Nammalvar
- Language: Tamil
- Period: 9th–10th century CE
- Verses: 100

The Tiruviruttam (Tamil: திருவிருத்தம், lit. 'sacred verses') is a work of Tamil Hindu literature composed by Nammalvar, a poet-saint of the Sri Vaishnava tradition. Comprising one hundred verses, is one of the many works present in the compilation known as the Nalayira Divya Prabandham. According to tradition, it is said to contain the quintessence of the Rigveda.

== Structure ==
The Tiruviruttam is framed as a love story that unfolds between an anonymous heroine (talaivi) and her beloved hero (talaivan), while friends, fortune tellers, bees, birds, and the poet’s own heart play important supporting roles, acting as messengers, lamenters, and audiences in the style of a story. According to some interpretations, this poem is regarded to take the form of a dramatic sequence, in which a few characters discuss the love of God, which is portrayed as the earthly love between a man and a woman. In this regard, the poet Nammalvar's yearning for God expresses itself through a woman's love-tossed heart pining for her omnipotent lover. Secular love for a man by a woman is framed as divine love for God himself in this work.

The Indologist David Shulman states that the hymns of the Tiruviruttam, "create a poetic or aesthetic world suffused by classical grammar".

== Hymns ==
Topics in Tamil literature
Sangam Literature
Five Great Epics
Silappatikaram	Manimekalai
Civaka Cintamani	Valayapathi
Kundalakesi
Five Minor Epics
Neelakesi	Culamani
Naga Kumara Kaviyam	Udayana Kumara Kaviyam
Yashodhara Kaviyam
Bhakti Literature
Naalayira Divya Prabandham	Kamba Ramayanam
Tevaram	Tirumurai
Tamil people
Sangam	Sangam landscape
Tamil history from Sangam literature	Ancient Tamil music
Religion in ancient Tamilakam

The hymns of the Tiruviruttam are structured as a conversation, or a series of exchanges between the heroine of the poem and her friends. The first few hymns of this poem serve as an example of this format:

False wisdom, wicked conduct, dirty bodies
let us not draw near such things now
To protect life
you took birth from many wombs
O master of the unblinking ones
stand before me embodied
listen graciously to a servant’s plea

— Nammalvar, Tiruviruttam, Hymn 1

One of the responses of the heroine's friends is written thus:

They haven't flowered yet,
the fat konrai trees,
nor hung out their garlands
and golden circlets
in their sensual canopy of leaves
along the branches,

dear girl,
dear as the paradise of our lord who measured the earth
girdled by the restless sea,

they are waiting
with buds
for the return
of your lover
once twined in your arms.

— Nammalvar, Tiruviruttam, Hymn 68

== See also ==
- Tiruchanda Viruttam
- Tiruvaymoli
- Perumal Tirumoli
