= Tiruvaymoli =

Tamil literary work

- ← Periya Tirumatal Ramanuja Nutrantati →
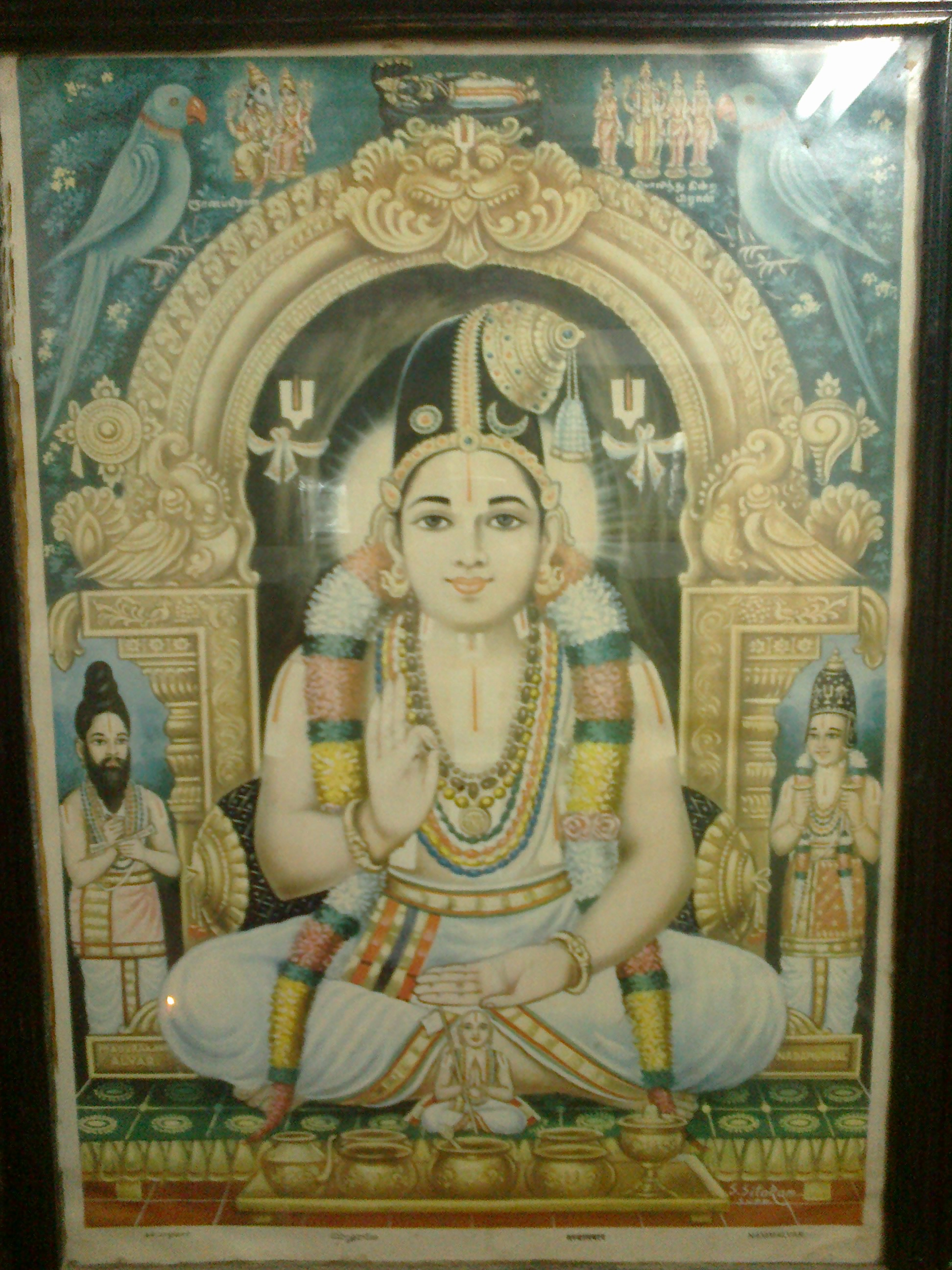
- Painting of Nammalvar.

Information
- Religion: Hinduism
- Author: Nammalvar
- Language: Tamil
- Period: 9th–10th century CE
- Verses: 1102

The Tiruvaymoli (Tamil: திருவாய்மொழி, romanized: Ṭiruvāymoḻi) is a work of Tamil Hindu literature. Comprising 1102 verses, it was composed in the ninth century CE by the Hindu poet-saint Nammalvar, who is regarded as the foremost of the Alvar saints of South India. It is the most prominent work of the Nalayira Divya Prabandham, a compilation of the Alvars towards the devotion of Vishnu. It is frequently referred to as the Tamilveda or the Dravidaveda.

== Structure ==
The poem is divided into 10 sections (pattu) of about 100 verses each. Each hundred is divided into 10 decads (tiruvaymoli) 28 of 10 verses (pasuram) each. A special feature of the poem is that it is in the style of an antati, that is, the last words of one verse forms the opening words of the next one. This is carried on through all 1,102 verses; the last words of the poem are also the first words of the poem. Nammalvar is said to have stated that these "thousand songs are to be spread abroad by people of the Tamil land, musicians and devotees". The deity Vishnu, addressed in these poems, is also exalted in Sanskrit myth and epic. In this poem, Vishnu is himself a symbol of the coalescence between Tamil and Sanskrit literatures. Nammalvar's poems are addressed to Tirumal or Mayon, "the dark one," the god of the mullai landscape and of Sangam poems, identified with Vishnu. Sanskrit myths are known to Nammalvar, and he alludes to them frequently, but it is Vishnu who is cast in the role of a king and a lover, reminiscent of the heroes of the war and love poems of the ancient Tamil. Drawing upon classical Tamil poetry, the conventions are adapted to the devotional milieu.

== Significance ==
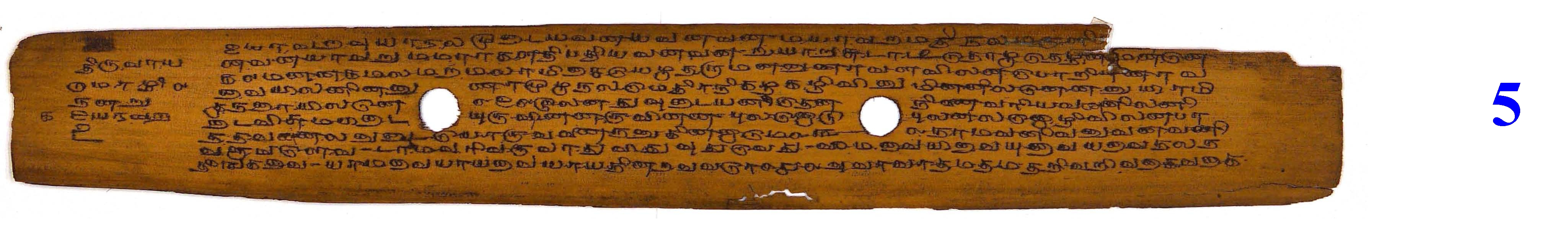
Tiruvaymoli Manuscript in Tamil Hymns of 1:1

According to Vasudha Narayanan, the Tamilveda is not an imitation of the Sanskrit Veda or even a translation; it is considered to have been revealed through the twelve Alvars and primarily through Nammalvar, a poet-saint who lived between the eighth and ninth centuries CE. This work is considered to be historic since no vernacular language had hitherto been held to be the medium of revelation within Hinduism; no other work had been called a Veda. For the first time in Hindu literature, hymns in a language other than Sanskrit were considered to be revealed. According to Sri Vaishnava tradition, the message of both these Vedas were considered to be the same, and later theologians went to elaborate lengths to show how their ideas parallel each other.

Selections from the Tiruvaymoli are recited daily at Sri Vaishnava homes, often recited at its entirety at funeral services, ancestral rites, birthdays of saints, rituals regarding pregnancy, and at the investiture ceremonies of young boys, known as the upanayana. Each set of the ten verses of the poem are presented containing a coherent theme in its commentaries, the main philosophical idea condensed into a single verse.

== Hymns ==
Topics in Tamil literature
Sangam Literature
Five Great Epics
Silappatikaram	Manimekalai
Civaka Cintamani	Valayapathi
Kundalakesi
Five Minor Epics
Neelakesi	Culamani
Naga Kumara Kaviyam	Udayana Kumara Kaviyam
Yashodhara Kaviyam
Bhakti Literature
Naalayira Divya Prabandham	Kamba Ramayanam
Tevaram	Tirumurai
Tamil people
Sangam	Sangam landscape
Tamil history from Sangam literature	Ancient Tamil music
Religion in ancient Tamilakam

A hymn from the Tiruvaymoli imagines the author pining for Krishna, referred to as Kannan:

Dark as the blue seas, Kannan,
the black diamond of the heavenly hosts,
He is my dear life,
the Light that sleeps on the many-hooded serpent—
to destroy the army of the Hundred who came to kill,
once upon a time he sided with the Five,
and in that terrible war that day
he drove a chariot—
when will these eyes glimpse
the sounding anklets on his feet, Oh when?

— Tiruvaymoli, Hymn 3.6.10

== See also ==
- Tiruvaciriyam
- Perumal Tirumoli
- Periyalvar Tirumoli
