= Naṉṉūl =

Tamil Grammer book

Topics in Tamil literature
Sangam Literature
Five Great Epics
Silappatikaram	Manimekalai
Civaka Cintamani	Valayapathi
Kundalakesi
Five Minor Epics
Neelakesi	Culamani
Naga Kumara Kaviyam	Udayana Kumara Kaviyam
Yashodhara Kaviyam
Bhakti Literature
Naalayira Divya Prabandham	Kamba Ramayanam
Tevaram	Tirumurai
Tamil people
Sangam	Sangam landscape
Tamil history from Sangam literature	Ancient Tamil music
Religion in ancient Tamilakam

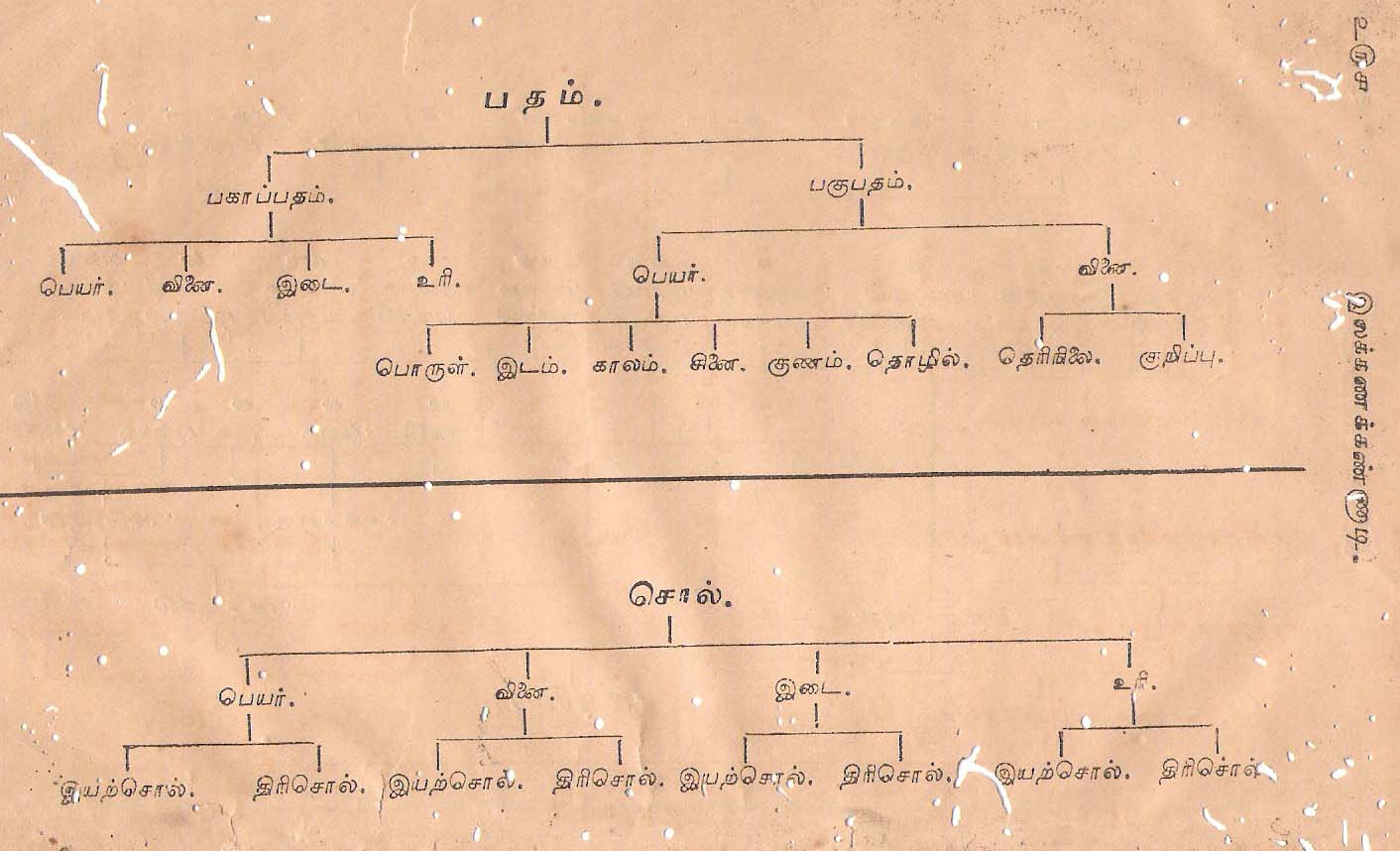
Nannul approached

Naṉṉūl (Tamil: நன்னூல்) is a work on Tamil grammar written by a Jain ascetic Pavananthi Munivar between 1178–1216. It is the most significant work on Tamil grammar after Tolkāppiyam. The work credits Western Ganga vassal king Seeya Gangan of Kolar with patronising it.

About 20 commentaries have been written on Nannūl up to 19th century CE. Nannūl was divided into five sections: written language, spoken language, semantics, poetic language and rhetorical devices. The latter three sections have been lost, so only the parts on written and spoken language are extant today.

In Tamil, nal means good and nūl means book, so Nannūl means good book.

== See also ==
- Karanthai Pavananthi munivar
