= Naalayira Divya Prabandham =

Work of Tamil Hindu literature

Divya Prabandham
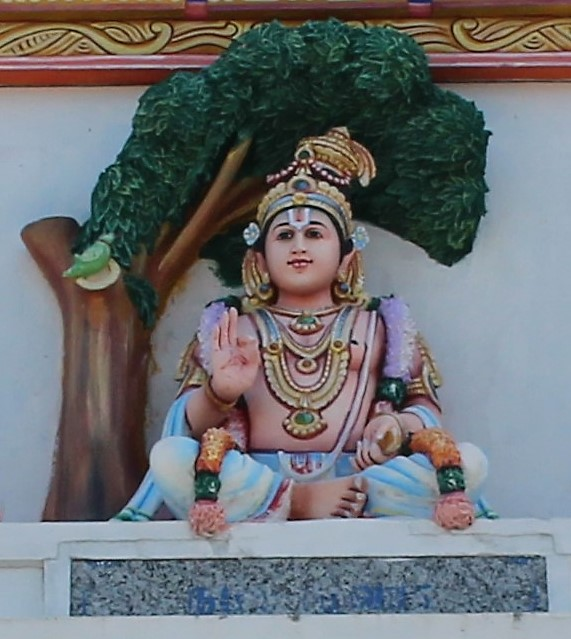
- Nammalvar, considered the most prominent of the twelve Alvars whose works are compiled as Prabandam

Information
- Religion: Hinduism
- Author: Alvars
- Language: Tamil
- Period: 9th–10th century CE
- Verses: 4,000

Topics in Tamil literature
Sangam Literature
Five Great Epics
Silappatikaram	Manimekalai
Civaka Cintamani	Valayapathi
Kundalakesi
Five Minor Epics
Neelakesi	Culamani
Naga Kumara Kaviyam	Udayana Kumara Kaviyam
Yashodhara Kaviyam
Bhakti Literature
Naalayira Divya Prabandham	Kamba Ramayanam
Tevaram	Tirumurai
Tamil people
Sangam	Sangam landscape
Tamil history from Sangam literature	Ancient Tamil music
Religion in ancient Tamilakam

The Naalayira Divya Prabandham (Tamil: நாலாயிரத் திவ்வியப் பிரபந்தம், romanized: Nālāyira Divya Prabandham, lit. 'Four Thousand Divine Hymns') is a collection of 4,000 Tamil verses composed by the 12 Alvars. It was compiled in its present form by Nāthamuni during the 9th–10th centuries. The work, an important liturgical compilation by the Tamil Alvars who lived between the 5th and 8th centuries CE, marked the formal canonisation of the twelve Vaishnava poet-saints, and its hymns are still sung extensively today.

== Description ==
The Divya Prabandham extols Narayana (Vishnu) and his various manifestations. The Alvars sang these songs at various sacred shrines known as the Divya Desams. These hymns originated during the early phase of bhakti tradition development in South India.

The Tamil Sri Vaishnavas, also known as Ubhaya Vedanti, follow both the Sanskrit Vedas and the Naalayira Divya Prabandham regarded by adherents as the Tamil Veda. In many temples—Srirangam, for example—the chanting of the Divya Prabandham forms a major part of the daily service, integrating poetic composition with ritual worship and devotional practice. It is also recited in some North Indian Vaishnavite temples, such as Badrinath. The Divya Prabandham is recited alongside the Vedas, having been granted equal status in the Sri Vaishnava tradition largely through the efforts of Ramanuja, who elevated the Divya Prabandham to the same level as the Vedas.

Prominent among its 4,000 verses are the 1,102 verses known as the Tiruvaymoli ("Sacred Utterance" i.e. Tamil Śruti), composed by Nammalvar, which forms the third portion of the overall Divya Prabandham. In many of these verses, Nammalvar adopts the mood of a lovelorn gopi pining for Krishna.

The compendium begins with the Tirupallantu, a benedictory hymn composed by Periyalvar that invokes long life and protection upon Vishnu.

=== Structure ===
The text is divided into four sections of roughly 1,000 pasurams (stanzas) each. In sequential order, these are: Mudalayiram, Irandam Ayiram, Munram Ayiram, and Iyarppa. This four-section division reflects the later canonical organization of the hymns, which were composed by different Alvars over several centuries.

=== Nomenclature ===
==== Pasuram ====
The devotional hymns sung by the Alvars in praise of Vishnu are specifically referred to as pasurams in Tamil.

==== Taniyan ====
The works that make up the Naalayira Divya Prabandham are usually preceded by a taniyan. A taniyan is a laudatory verse that offers a brief synopsis of the Alvar's life, summarizes the themes of the work, and emphasises the spiritual merit gained from recitating, listening to, or reading the text. It serves to glorify both the hymns and the composer. Six taniyans precede the Tiruvaymoli, the highest number for any individual work in the compendium.

==== Vāḻi Tirunāmam ====
Following the customary recitation of a work's hymns, a vaḻi tirunāmam is chanted. This is a hymn that commemorates or exalts the poet-saint who composed the given work. For instance, such a verse may invoke a long life for the poet-saint or express the wish that their name be remembered for a millennium.

== Compilation ==
The collection, once thought to have been lost, was organised in the form of an anthology by Nathamuni. According to tradition, Nathamuni compiled the Naalayira Divya Prabandham in the 10th century, after the Alvars.

Nathamuni was born in Veera Naarayanapuram (Veeranam) or present-day Kaattu Mannaar Koil. There is a long chronological gap between Tirumangai Alvar (the last Alvar) and Nathamuni, a period during which the transmission history of the 4,000 verses is obscure.

According to legend, Nathamuni once heard some people reciting the cantos of Āravāmude of Nammalvar at Kumbakonam. Captivated by these pasurams (hymns), he wanted to know more about them. One of the verses also mentioned Āyiraththul Ippaththu (Tamil: these 10 out of the 1000). When Nathamuni inquired about the remaining 990, the reciters did not know anything about the other verses.

Guided by the name and place of the Alvar (Kurugoor Satakopan) mentioned in the verses, Nathamuni proceeded to Thirukurugoor and asked the people there about Nammalvar's 1,000 verses. The people did not know the 1,000 verses that Nathamuni wanted, but they told him about 11 pasurams (hymns) of Madhurakavi Alvar, a disciple of Nammalvar, and the Kanninun Cirutampu. They asked him to go to Thiruppulialvar, the ancient tamarind tree Nammalvar preferred to meditate under during his lifetime, and recite these 11 pasurams 12,000 times. Nathamuni did as advised, and pleased with his penance, Nammalvar appeared and granted Nathamuni not only his 1,000 pasurams, but the entire 4,000-pasuram collection of all the Alvars.

== Hymns ==
The following table shows the details of the 4,000 pasurams (hymns). (Note: Vedānta Deśika and his followers do not count Tirupallāṇḍu as a separate book within the collection, and instead compress Śiriya Tirumaḍal and Periya Tirumaḍal into 40 and 78 verses respectively. They include the 108 verses of Rāmānuja-nūṟṟandādī at the end to bring the total to 4000.)

No.	Name	Starting hymn	Ending hymn	Number of hymns	Poet
1	Tirupallāṇḍu	1	12	12	Periyāḻvār
2	Periyāḻvāra Tirumoḻi	13	473	461	Periyāḻvār
3	Tiruppāvai	474	503	30	Āṇḍāḻ
4	Nācciyāra Tirumoḻi	504	646	143	Āṇḍāḻ
5	Perumāḻa Tirumoḻi	647	751	105	Kulaśekhara Āḻvār
6	Tiruccanda Viruttam	752	871	120	Tirumaḻiśai Āḻvār
7	Tirumālai	872	916	45	Toṇḍaraḍippoḍi
8	Tirupaḻḻi-eḻucci	917	926	10	Toṇḍaraḍippoḍi
9	Amalanādipirāṇa	927	936	10	Tiruppan Alvar
10	Kaṇṇinuṇ-Śiruttāmbu	937	947	11	Madhurakavi Āḻvār
11	Periya Tirumoḻi	948	2031	1084	Tirumaṅgai Āḻvār
12	Tirukkuruntāṇḍakam	2032	2051	20	Tirumaṅgai Āḻvār
13	Tiruneḍuntāṇḍakam	2052	2081	30	Tirumaṅgai Āḻvār
14	Mudala Tiruvandādi	2082	2181	100	Poygai Āḻvār
15	Iraṇḍām Tiruvandādi	2182	2281	100	Putattāḻvār
16	Mūṉṟām Tiruvandādi	2282	2381	100	Pey Āḻvār
17	Nāṉmukaṉ Tiruvandādi	2382	2477	96	Tirumaḻiśai Āḻvār
18	Tiruviruttam	2478	2577	100	Nammāḻvār
19	Tiruvāciriyam	2578	2584	7	Nammāḻvār
20	Periya Tiruvandādi	2585	2671	87	Nammāḻvār
21	Tiruveḻukūṟṟirukkai	2672	2672	1	Tirumaṅgai Āḻvār
22	Śiriya Tirumaḍal	2673	2749.5	77.5	Tirumaṅgai Āḻvār
23	Periya Tirumaḍal	2750.5	2898	148.5	Tirumaṅgai Āḻvār
24	Tiruvāymoḻi	2899	4000	1102	Nammāḻvār
N/A	Rāmānuja-nūṟṟandādī	-	-	108	Tiruvaraṅgattamudanār
	Total			4000	

== Sources ==
- Bharati, Srirama (2000). The Sacred Book of Four Thousand. Chennai: Sri Sadagopan Tirunarayanaswami Divya Prabandha Pathasala.
- Carman, John (1989). The Tamil Veda: Pillan's Interpretation of the Tiruvaymoli. Chicago: University of Chicago Press. ISBN 978-0-226-09306-2.
- Chari, S. M. Srinivasa (1997). Philosophy and Theistic Mysticism of the Āl̲vārs. Motilal Banarsidass Publ. ISBN 978-81-208-1342-7.
- Clooney, Francis X. (2019). "Review of My Sapphire-hued Lord, My Beloved! Kulacēkara Āḻvār's Perumāl Tirumoḻi". Journal of the American Oriental Society. 139 (4): 986–988. ISSN 0003-0279. JSTOR 10.7817/jameroriesoci.139.4.0986.
- Gupta, Sonika; Padmanabhan, Sudarsan (19 September 2017). Politics and Cosmopolitanism in a Global Age. Routledge. ISBN 978-1-317-34132-1.
- Nammalvar (17 February 2020). Endless Song. Penguin Random House India Private Limited. ISBN 978-93-5305-779-4.
- Nayar, Nancy Ann (1992). Poetry as Theology: The Śrīvaiṣṇava Stotra in the Age of Rāmānuja. Otto Harrassowitz Verlag. ISBN 978-3-447-03255-1.
- Pārttacārati, Intirā (2008). Ramanujar: The Life and Ideas of Ramanuja. Oxford University Press. ISBN 978-0-19-569161-0.
- Prabhu, S. (8 August 2013). "Dance of Devotion". The Hindu. ISSN 0971-751X.
- Rajarajan, R. K. K. (2013). "Historical sequence of the Vaiṣṇava Divyadeśas. Sacred venues of Viṣṇism". Acta Orientalia, Societates Orientales Danica Fennica Norvegia Svecia. 74: 37–90.
- Ramesh, M. S. (1992). 108 Vaishnavite Divya Desams: Divya desams in Chola Nadu. T.T. Devasthanams.
- Rengarajan, Sampath (20 June 1999). "thoo nilA muRRam - part 40 - Sri ArA amutha AzhwAr". Ramanuja.org. Bhakti List Archives.
- Sadagopan, V. (16 July 1997). "Sriman Naatha Muni's Thirunakshthram : A Tribute". Ramanuja.org. Bhakti List Archives.
- Seetharaman, Ma. (October 2009). Sri Ramanujar - The brief history and deeds of Vaishnavitse Saint Sri Ramanuja (in Tamil). Chennai: T. S. Raamalingam Narmadha Pathipagam.
- Sullivan, Bruce M. (1997). Historical Dictionary of Hinduism. Scarecrow Press. ISBN 9780810833272.
- Venkatacharya, T. (1999). Śrīveṅkaṭeśasuprabhātam. Adyar Library and Research Centre. ISBN 978-81-85141-28-2.
- Venkatesan, Archana (10 January 2016). The Secret Garland: Andal's Tiruppavai and Nacciyar Tirumoli. Harper Perennial India. ISBN 978-93-5177-577-5.
- Viraraghavacharya, T. K. T. (1979). History of Tirupati: The Thiruvengadam Temple. Tirumala-Tirupati Devasthanams.

== See also ==
- Tiruvaymoli
- Perumal Tirumoli
- Periya Tirumoli
- Nachiyar Tirumoli
- Tiruviruttam
