= Perumal Tirumoli =

Tamil Hindu work of literature

- ← Nachiyar Tirumoli Tiruchanda Viruttam →
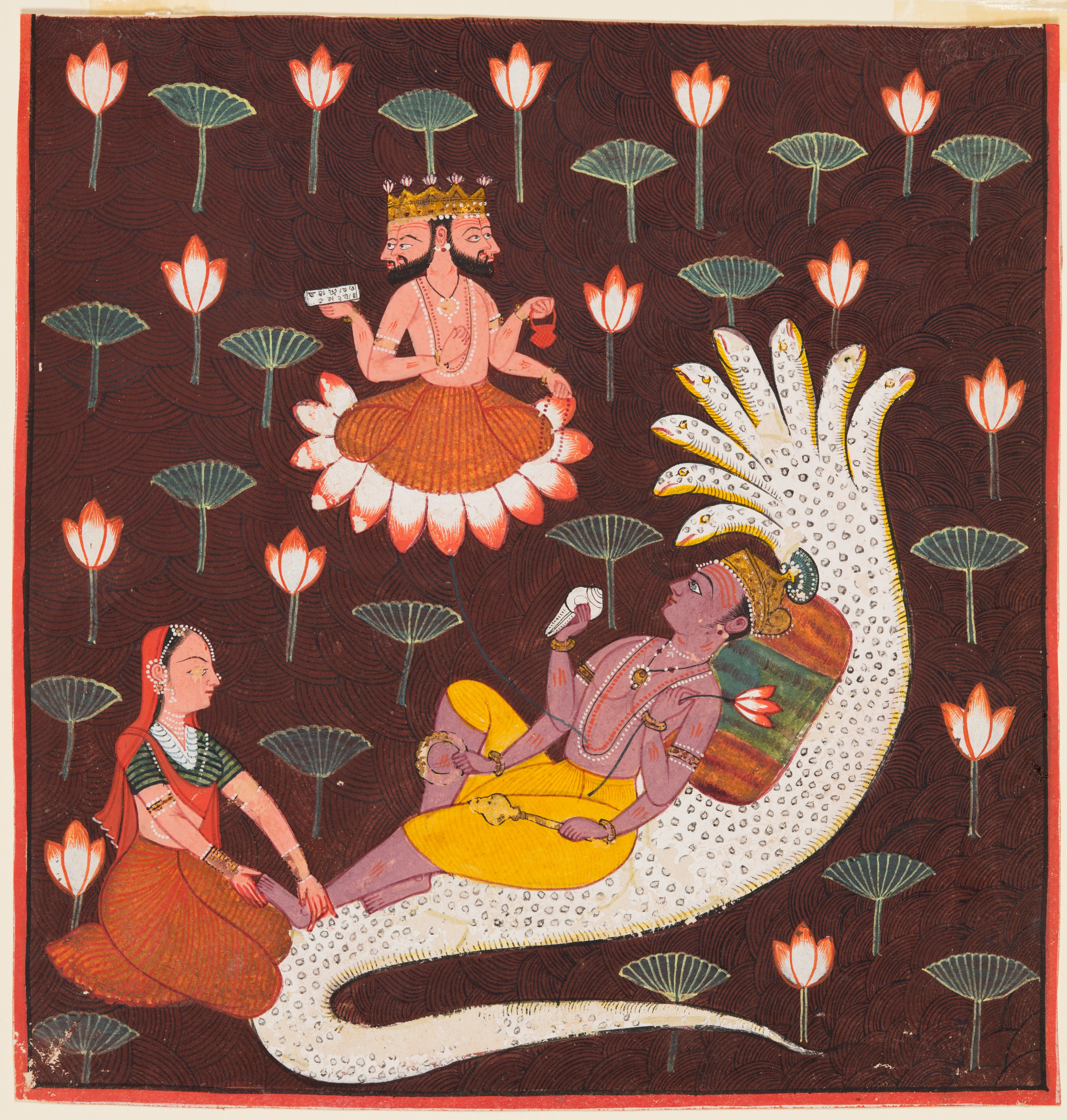
- Painting of Vishnu upon Shesha, Cleveland Museum of Art.

Information
- Religion: Hinduism
- Author: Kulasekhara Alvar
- Language: Tamil
- Period: 9th–10th century CE
- Verses: 105

The Perumal Tirumoli (Tamil: பெருமாள் திருமொழி, romanized: Perumāl Tirumoḻi, lit. 'sacred words of the great god') is a work of Tamil Hindu literature composed by Kulasekhara Alvar, one of the Alvars, the poet-saints of the Sri Vaishnava tradition. This work, which is part of the Nalayira Divya Prabandham, consists of 105 hymns numbered 647 to 750 in the compendium. It is dedicated to the worship of Vishnu, who is referred to as Perumal.

== Hymns ==
The Perumal Tirumoli mostly contains decads on the holy town of Srirangam, as well as on Rama and Krishna, the latter of which are regarded as having great poetic merit.

The first pasuram, or hymn, of this work is as follows:

When is the day that my pair of eyes shall rejoice, beholding
the dark Sapphire, the delicate One, who sleeps
— as clear-watered Ponni rubs [His] feet
with the hands [that are her] waves
— in the great town of Srirangam, having reached
the bed of great whiteness shining with ornaments,
called Ananta, the king of serpents, the great effulgence,
whose forehead twinkles with gems that glow
so that darkness retreats, [and] over whom spread a thousand hoods with groups
of decorative spots?

— Perumal Tirumoli, Hymn 1.1

== See also ==
Topics in Tamil literature
Sangam Literature
Five Great Epics
Silappatikaram	Manimekalai
Civaka Cintamani	Valayapathi
Kundalakesi
Five Minor Epics
Neelakesi	Culamani
Naga Kumara Kaviyam	Udayana Kumara Kaviyam
Yashodhara Kaviyam
Bhakti Literature
Naalayira Divya Prabandham	Kamba Ramayanam
Tevaram	Tirumurai
Tamil people
Sangam	Sangam landscape
Tamil history from Sangam literature	Ancient Tamil music
Religion in ancient Tamilakam

- Periyalvar Tirumoli
- Nachiyar Tirumoli
- Tiruviruttam
