= Tiruchanda Viruttam =

Tamil Hindu work of literature

- ← Perumal Tirumoli Tirumālai →
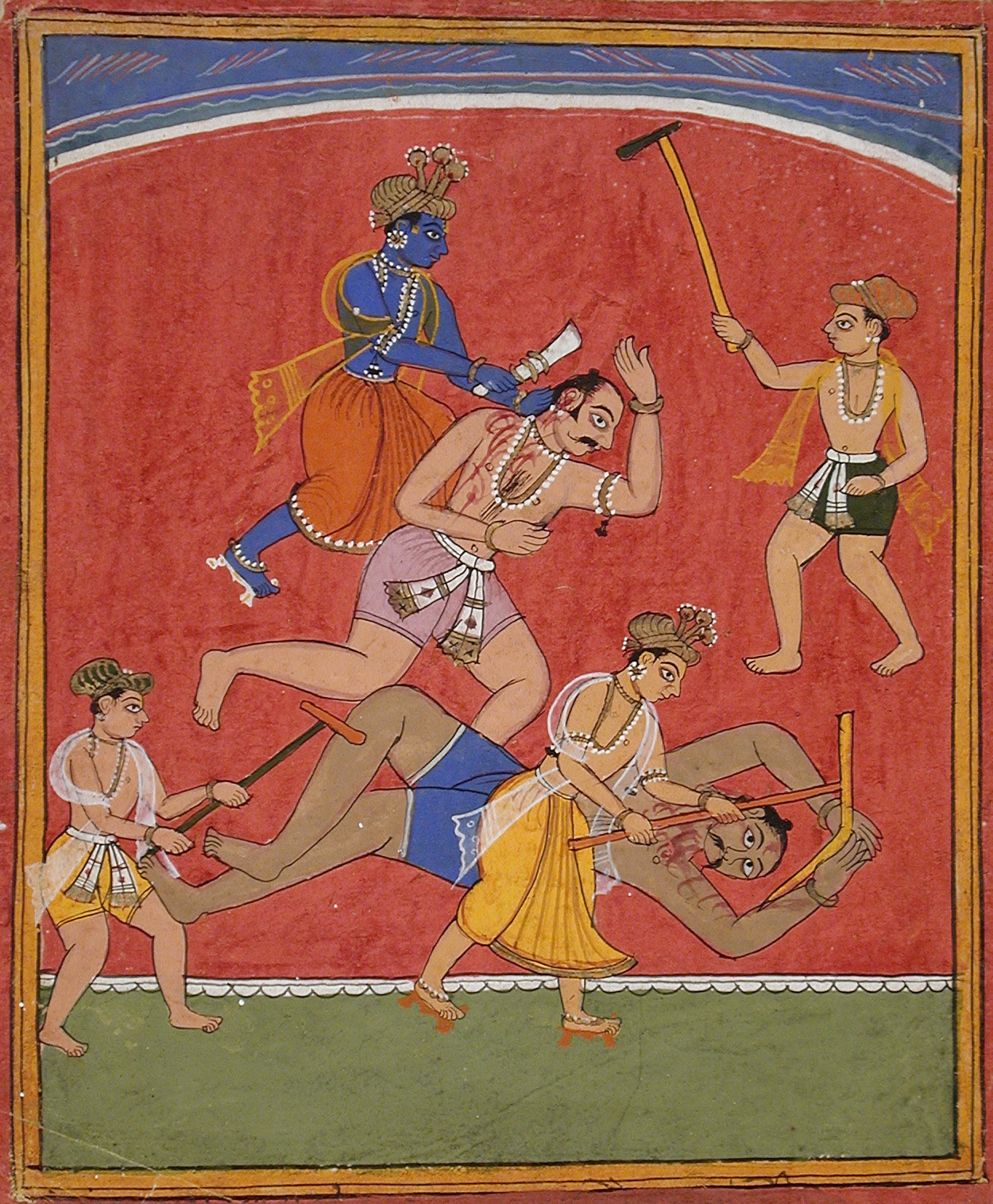
- Painting of Krishna slaying Kamsa, Los Angeles County Museum of Art.

Information
- Religion: Hinduism
- Author: Tirumalisai Alvar
- Language: Tamil
- Period: 9th–10th century CE
- Verses: 120

The Tiruchanda Viruttam (Tamil: திருச்சந்த விருத்தம், romanized: Tirucandaviruttam) is a Tamil Hindu work of literature written by the poet-saint Tirumalisai Alvar, comprising 120 pasurams (hymns). It is a part of the Nalayira Divya Prabandham, the Sri Vaishnava canon of the Alvars. It is dedicated to the veneration of Vishnu, as well as his forms and incarnations, such as Krishna and Venkateshvara.

== Hymns ==
In the work, Tirumalisai Alvar offers a detailed account of the life of Krishna, his slaying of asuras, his subjugation of bulls to marry Nappinnai, as well as his role in the Kurukshetra War.

One of his hymns indicates Krishna's triumph over Kamsa, the deity's act of sucking the poisoned milk of Putana, as well as the three strides of Vamana:

You killed the mighty and angry Kamsa after breaking the white tusks of the greatly angered elephant which was out of control. Your feet traversed the worlds (as Vamana). Are you not the primordial Lord of the colour of collyrium who took the life by sucking the milk of the demoness who came deceitfully?

— Tiruchanda Viruttam, Hymn 43

It is speculated that Kambar, who wrote the Kamba Ramayanam, may have taken inspiration from some of the hymns of this work:

Thou wearing the cool basil garland laden with honey!
Aren't you the one who possesses the victorious bow
with which you aimed the darts of clay balls to
set straight the hunched back of Kooni?

— Tiruchanda Viruttam, Hymn 30

== See also ==
Topics in Tamil literature
Sangam Literature
Five Great Epics
| Silappatikaram | Manimekalai |
| Civaka Cintamani | Valayapathi |
| Kundalakesi |
Five Minor Epics
| Neelakesi | Culamani |
| Naga Kumara Kaviyam | Udayana Kumara Kaviyam |
| Yashodhara Kaviyam |
Bhakti Literature
| Naalayira Divya Prabandham | Kamba Ramayanam |
| Tevaram | Tirumurai |
Tamil people
| Sangam | Sangam landscape |
| Tamil history from Sangam literature | Ancient Tamil music |

- Tirupalliyeḻuchi
- Amalanatipiran
- Tirumālai
