= Buddhism and Jainism =

Indian religions

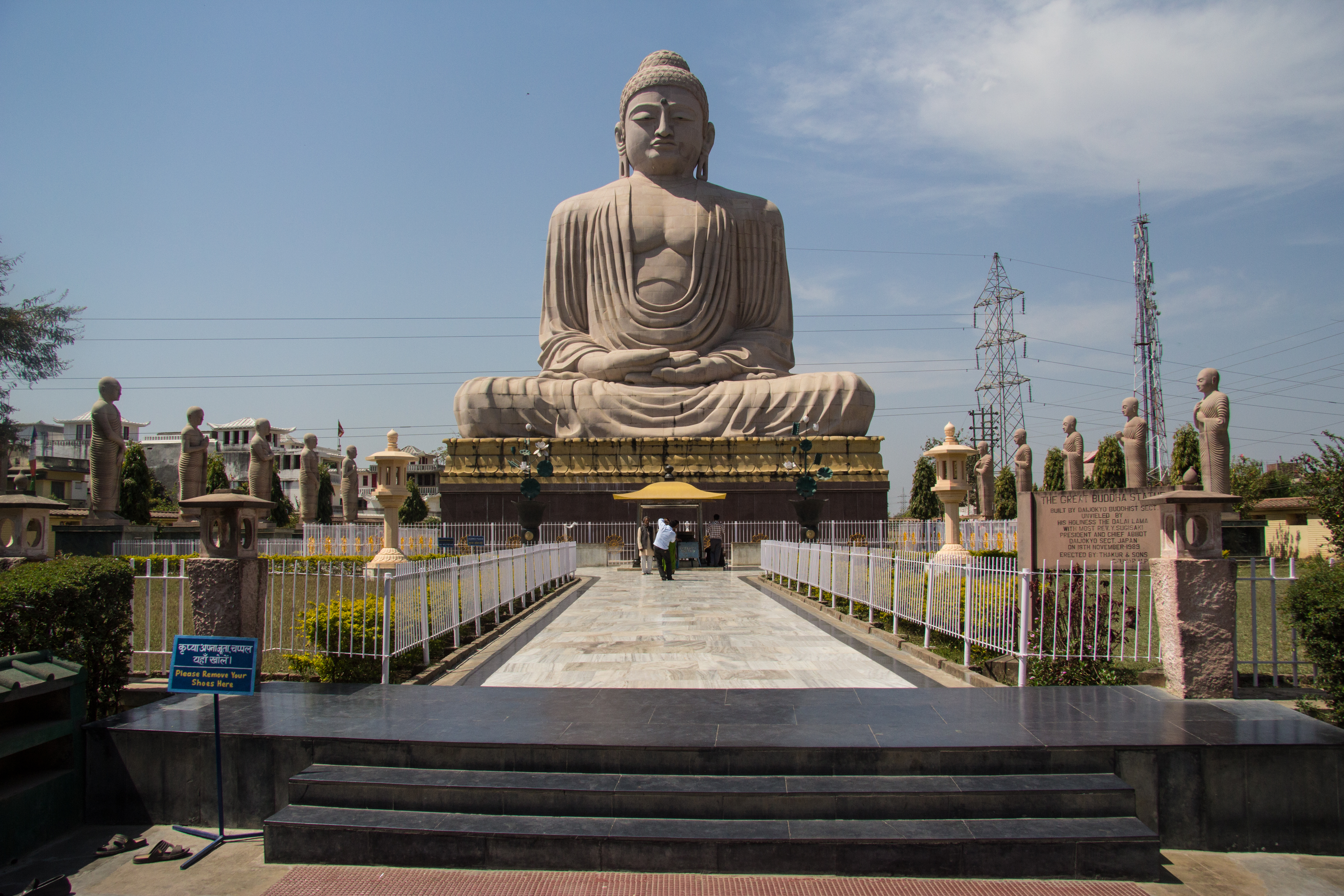
The Buddha: founder of Buddhism

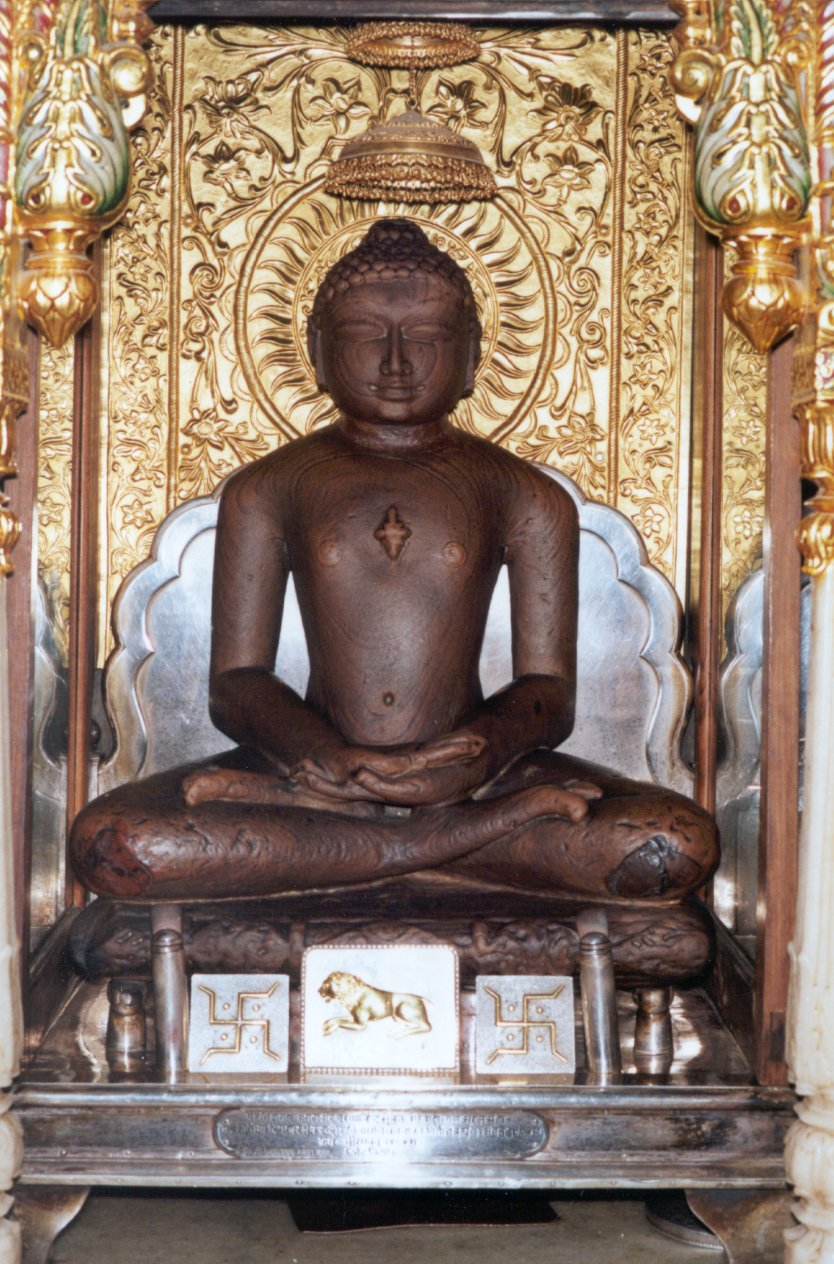
Mahāvīra: 24th Tirthankar of Jainism

Buddhism and Jainism are Eastern religions that developed in the Indian subcontinent. The Buddha and the 24th Jain Tirthankar, Mahavira are generally accepted as near contemporaries. Jainism and Buddhism share many features, terminology, and ethical principles, but emphasize them differently. Both are śramaṇa ascetic traditions that posit it is possible to attain liberation from the cycle of rebirths and deaths (samsara) through spiritual and ethical disciplines. They differ in some core doctrines, such as those on asceticism, Middle Way versus Anekantavada, and self versus non-self (jiva, atta, anatta).

== History ==
Jainism is an ancient religion whose own historiography centres on its 24 guides or Tirthankaras. Of the 24, the last two tirthankaras are generally accepted as historical persons, with the 23rd Tirthankara pre-dating the Buddha and the Mahavira by probably some 250 years. Buddhists believe Gautama Buddha, the historical buddha, rediscovered the long forgotten dharma around the 5th century BCE, and began to teach it again. In Buddhism there were previous buddhas, too, 24 in total as described in the Buddhavamsa, the 14th book of the Khuddaka Nikāya. Buddhists also believe that Gautama Buddha had many previous rebirths as described in the Jataka Tales.

The Mahavagga book of the Khandhaka (1. 22. 13), a Buddhist text, mentions a temple of Jain Tirthankar Suparśvanātha situated at Rajgir at the time of Gautama Buddha. Mentioning Jainism as the well established religion before the birth of Buddha.

Buddhist scriptures record that during Prince Siddhartha's ascetic life (before attaining enlightenment) he undertook many fasts, penances and austerities, the descriptions of which are elsewhere found only in the Jain tradition. In the Majjhima Nikaya, the Buddha shares his experience:

Thus far, Sāriputta, did I go in my penance? I went without clothes. I licked the food from my hands. I took no food that was brought or meant especially for me. I accepted no invitation to a meal.

The Jain text of Kalpasutra confirms Mahavira's asceticism, whose life is a source of guidance on many of the ascetic practices in Jainism. Such asceticism has been a hallmark of mendicant life in Jainism. The Buddha tried it, but abandoned what he called the "extreme ascetic methods", teaching the Middle Way instead.

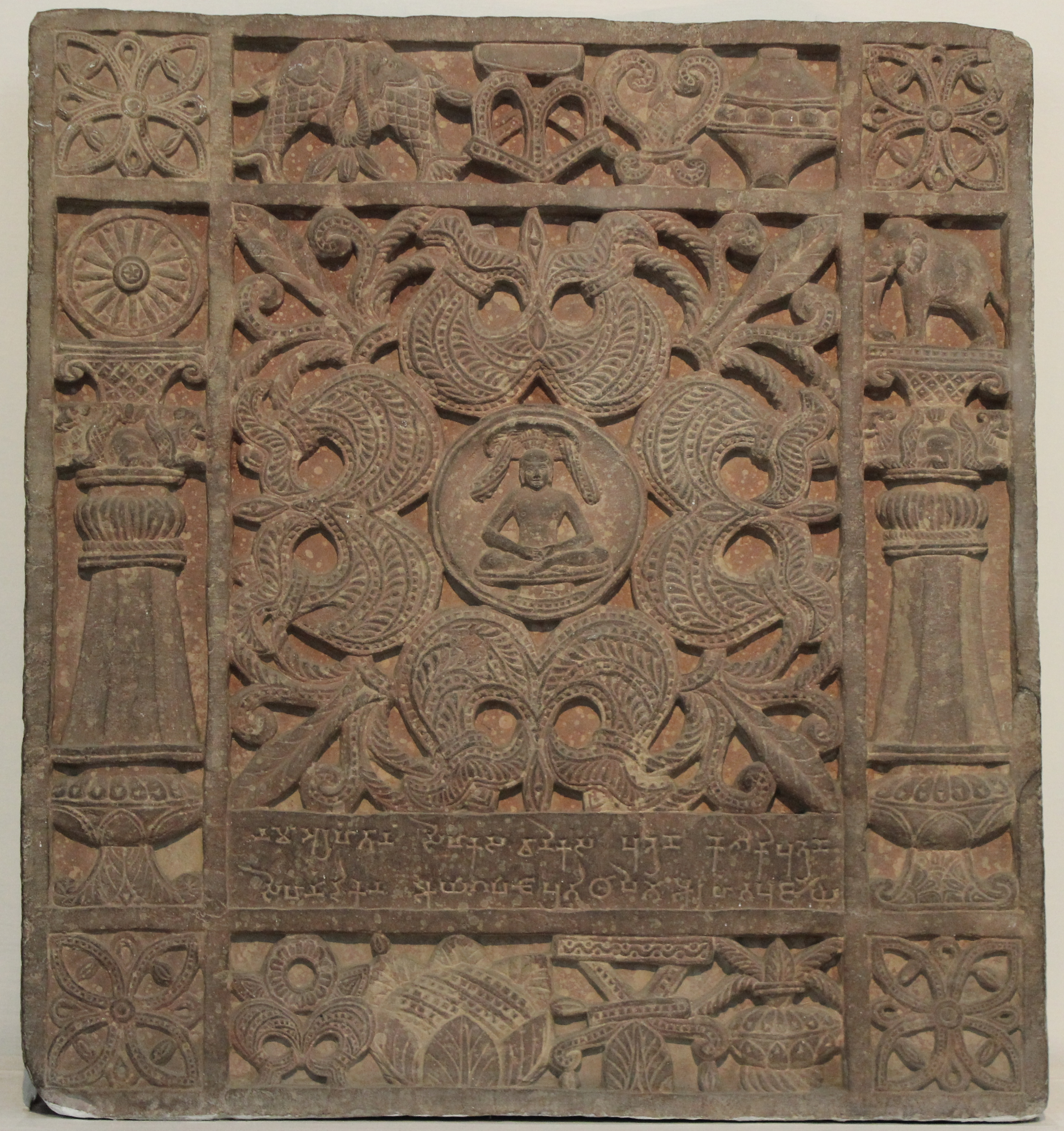
Jain Ayagapatta, Kushana, Mathura

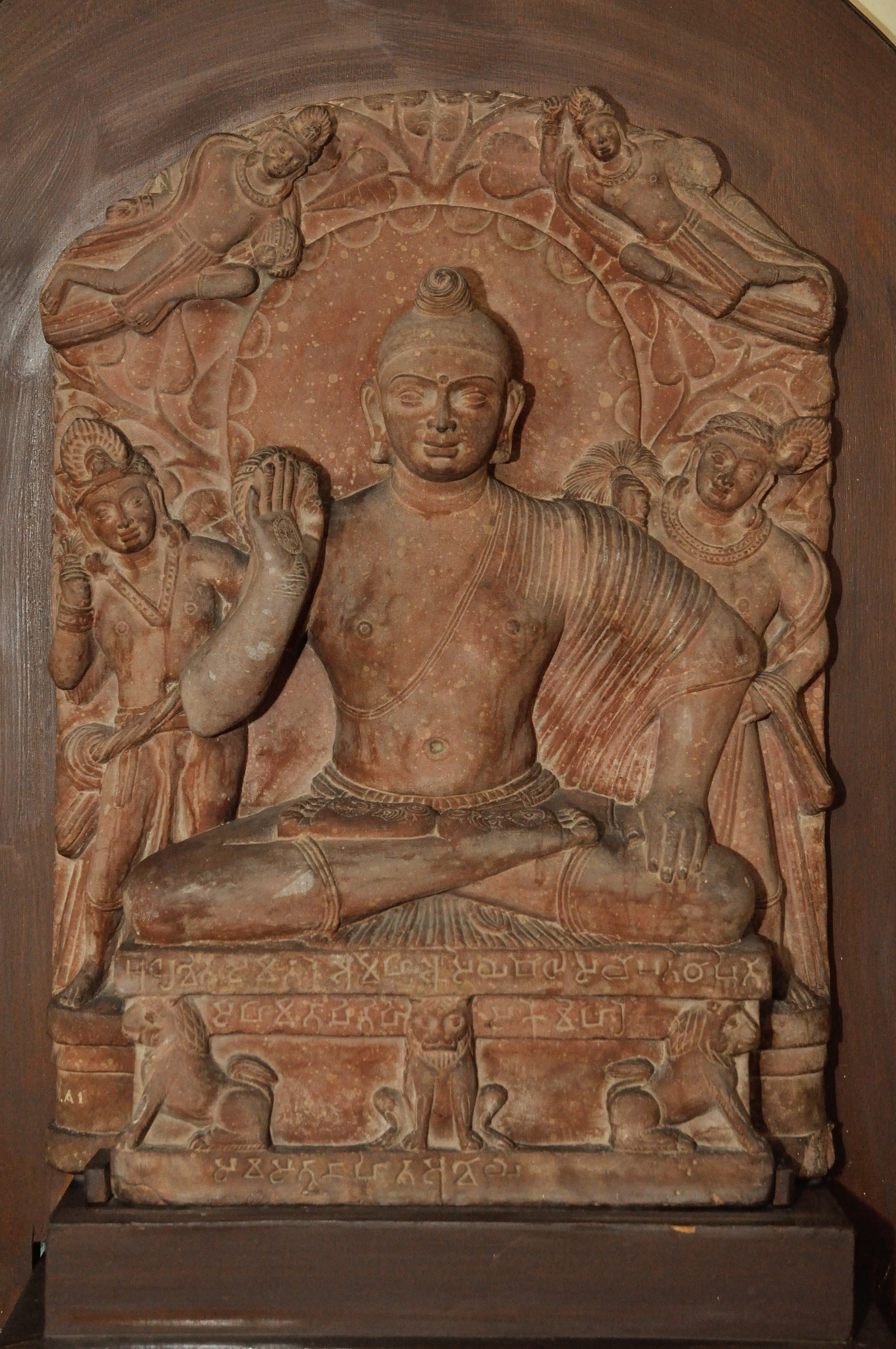
Buddha, Kushana, Mathura

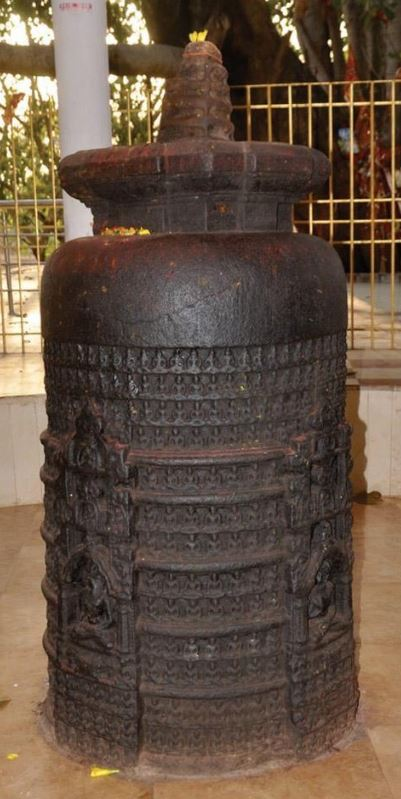
Sahastrakoot (1008) Jinalaya, Bhadrakali in Itury

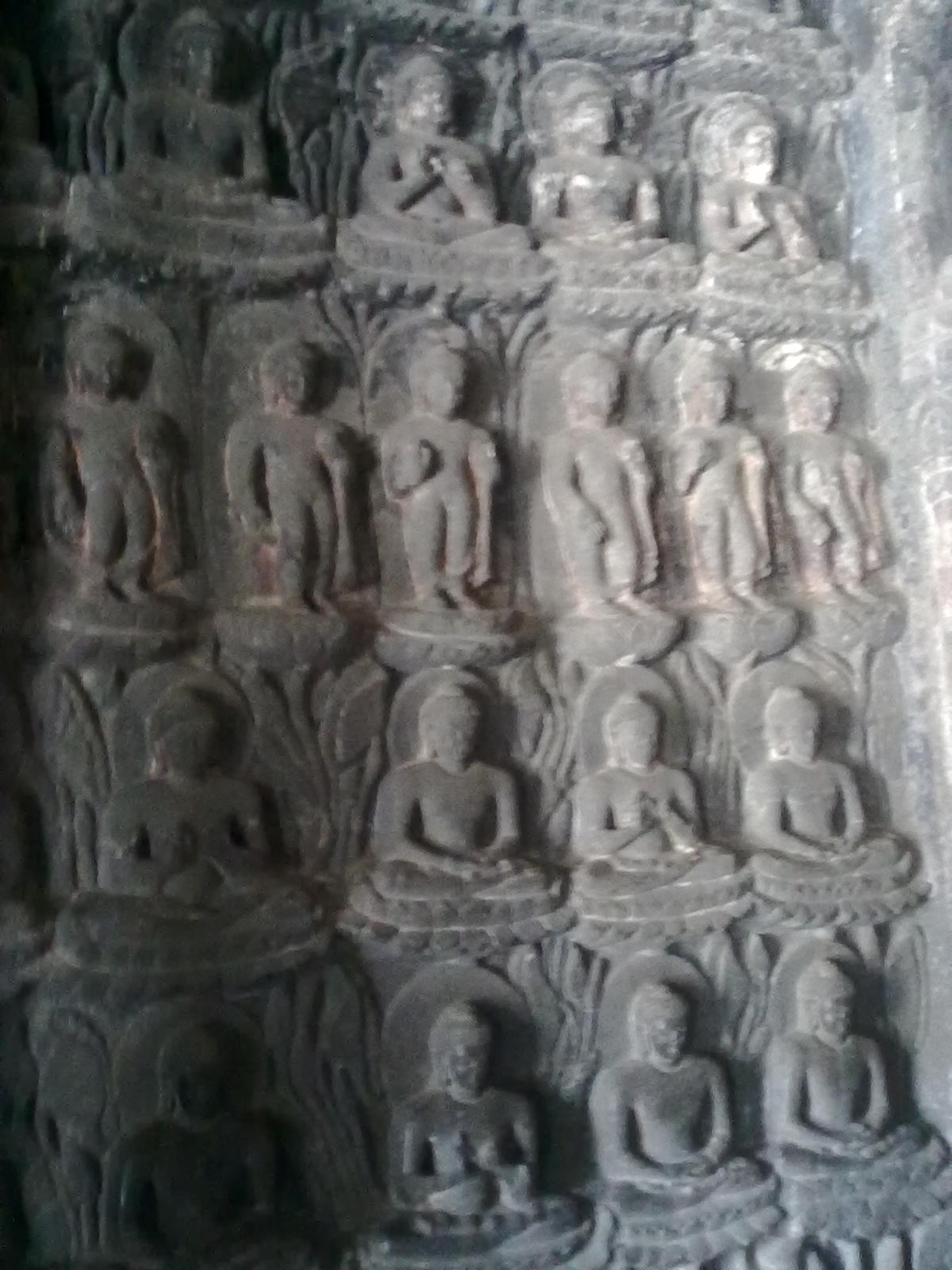
Multiple depictions of Buddha on a wall at Ajanta Caves

== Jainism in Buddhist texts ==
=== Pāli Canon ===
The Pāli Canon does not record that Mahavira and Gautama Buddha ever met, though instances of Mahavira's disciples questioning Gautama Buddha are to be found in various sutras. For instance, in the Majjhima Nikāya (MN 56), Upāli —one of Gautama Buddha's foremost disciples— is said to have been a disciple of the Mahavira who became a disciple of the Buddha after losing a debate with him. Acctually, there are 3 persons with same Upali name in the Pali Canon. The Upali in Jain is not the well-known Upāli.

The Buddhists have always maintained that by the time the Buddha and Mahavira were alive, Jainism was already an entrenched faith and culture in the region. According to the Pāli Canon, Gautama was aware of Mahavira's existence as well as the communities of Jain monastics.

Buddhist texts refer to the Mahavira as Nigaṇṭha Jñātaputta. Nigaṇṭha means "without knot, tie, or string" and Jñātaputta (son of Natas), referred to his clan of origin Jñāta or Naya (Prakrit).

The five vows (non-violence, truth, non-attachment, non-thieving, celibacy/chastity) propounded by the 23rd Jain Tirthankara, Pārśva (877–777 BCE), may have been the template for the Five Precepts of Buddhism. Additionally, the Buddhist Aṅguttaranikāya scripture quotes the independent philosopher Purana Kassapa, a sixth-century BCE founder of a now-extinct order, as listing the "Nirgranthas" as one of the six major classifications of humanity.

=== Divyavadana ===
The ancient text Divyavadana (Ashokavadana is one of its sections) mention that in one instance, a non-Buddhist in Pundravardhana drew a picture showing the Buddha bowing at the feet of Mahavira. On complaint from a Buddhist devotee, Ashoka, the Maurya Emperor, issued an order to arrest him, and subsequently, another order to kill all the Ājīvikas in Pundravardhana. Around 18,000 Ājīvikas were executed as a result of this order. Sometime later, another ascetic in Pataliputra drew a similar picture. Ashoka burnt him and his entire family alive in their house. He also announced an award of one dinara (silver coin) to anyone who brought him the head of a Jain. According to Ashokavadana, as a result of this order, his own brother, Vitashoka, was mistaken for a heretic and killed by a cowherd. Their ministers advised that "this is an example of the suffering that is being inflicted even on those who are free from desire" and that he "should guarantee the security of all beings". After this, Ashoka stopped giving orders for executions.

According to K. T. S. Sarao and Benimadhab Barua, stories of persecutions of rival sects by Ashoka appear to be a clear fabrication arising out of sectarian propaganda.

== Criticism of Buddhism in Jain scriptures ==
According to Padmanabh Jaini, Vasudhara Dharani, a Buddhist work was among the Jainas of Gujarat in 1960s, and a manuscript was copied in 1638 CE. The Dharani was recited by non-Jain Brahmin priests in private Jain homes. A Jain critique of Buddhist philosophy is articulated in the Chapter 7 (verse 62-70) of Atmasiddhi Shastra, a 19th-century text by Shrimad Rajchandra. It is a long poetry as a dialogue in which a disciple raises doubts about the existence and permanence of the soul, and the Guru responds with systematic refutations of Buddhist positions, especially the doctrine of momentariness (kshanikvaad) and the denial of a self.

- Soul and the body - The Buddhist view that the soul is born with the body and perishes at death is rejected. According to the Guru, consciousness cannot be explained as a mere function of bodily elements, since matter is insentient and lacks awareness. To reduce awareness to physical processes is therefore incoherent.
- Momentariness and change - The disciple points to the constant fluctuation of emotions such as anger and affection as evidence that the so-called soul itself is momentary. The Guru replies that such fluctuations prove the existence of a persisting knower who experiences these changing states. Without continuity of the subject, memory and recognition across time would be impossible.
- Problem of witness - If the soul were continually created and destroyed, no valid witness would be able to verify this. The body cannot bear witness, being insentient and itself being transient, and the soul cannot testify to its own non existence as it wasn't existing before its creation and after its destruction as per the claim. To invoke another witness leads to infinite regress. The claim of perpetual arising and perishing therefore lacks coherence.
- Consciousness as irreducible - The Guru argues that consciousness cannot be produced from material associations. Non conscious substances cannot generate awareness, for consciousness by nature knows itself and others. Rather than being a product of combinations, the soul is the knower of combinations.
- Matter and awareness as distinct - Jain reasoning insists on the distinctness of matter and consciousness. Matter remains inert regardless of transformations, while awareness is intrinsic only to the soul. Neither can be reduced to the other, and the Buddhist attempt to collapse this distinction is therefore rejected.
- Indestructibility - What is not created cannot be destroyed. Since the soul is not a product of material causes, it is not subject to annihilation. The permanence of the soul follows from its uncreated nature.
- Inborn tendencies - Innate tendencies evident from birth, such as fear, cruelty, or compassion, are explained as impressions carried over from previous lives. Their presence without training or social conditioning supports the view of a pre existent soul that persists across successive embodiments.
- Permanence with change - Invoking the doctrine of manifold viewpoints (anekāntavāda), the Guru distinguishes between two perspectives. From the standpoint of substance (dravya naya), the soul is permanent with its qualities of bliss, knowledge. From the standpoint of modes (paryāyā naya), states (such as emotions, instincts, inclinations, beliefs) arise and perish at every moment. Continuity of personal identity across childhood, youth, and old age illustrates permanence of substance amid changing modes. This nuanced view avoids both absolute permanence and absolute momentariness.
- Self contradiction of radical momentariness - The doctrine that everything ceases instantly is said to refute itself. To assert that “all is momentary” requires a persisting subject who remembers the doctrine and utters it at a later time. Radical momentariness cannot account for continuity of thought, memory, or speech.
- Conservation of substances - The Guru draws on the principle that no substance is utterly destroyed but only transformed. A seed and soil become a sprout, a tree, flower, and fruit, but the underlying substance (matter) continues. If this holds true for inert matter, then consciousness must also be indestructible. The permanence of each soul is affirmed by this universal law of conservation. In this manner Shrimad Rajchandra articulates a rebuttal of Buddhist absolute momentariness and soul denial, affirming instead that while the soul’s states are transient, its substance is eternal and indestructible.

== Shared terminology ==
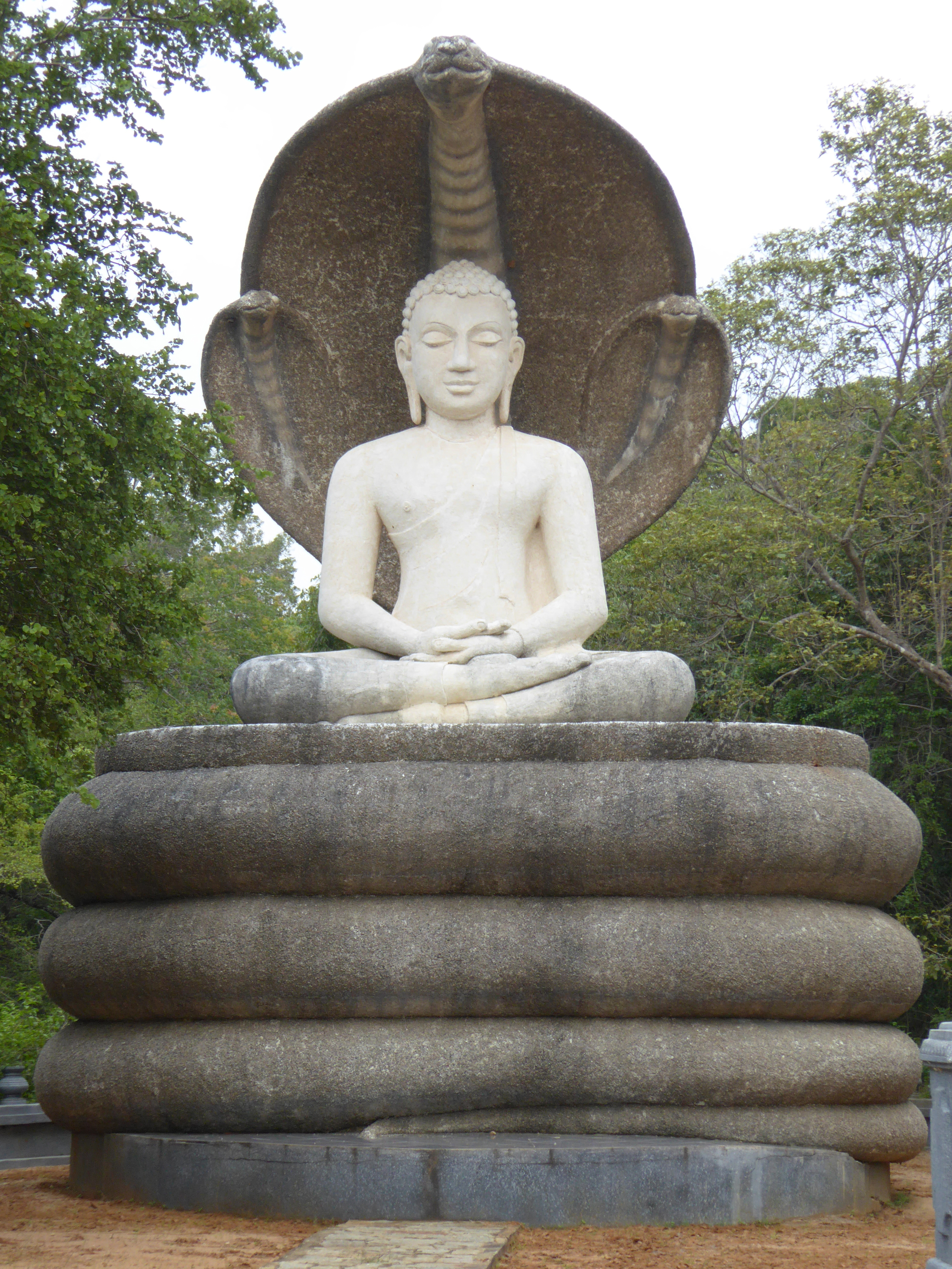
Buddha with Mucalinda Naga, Sri Lanka

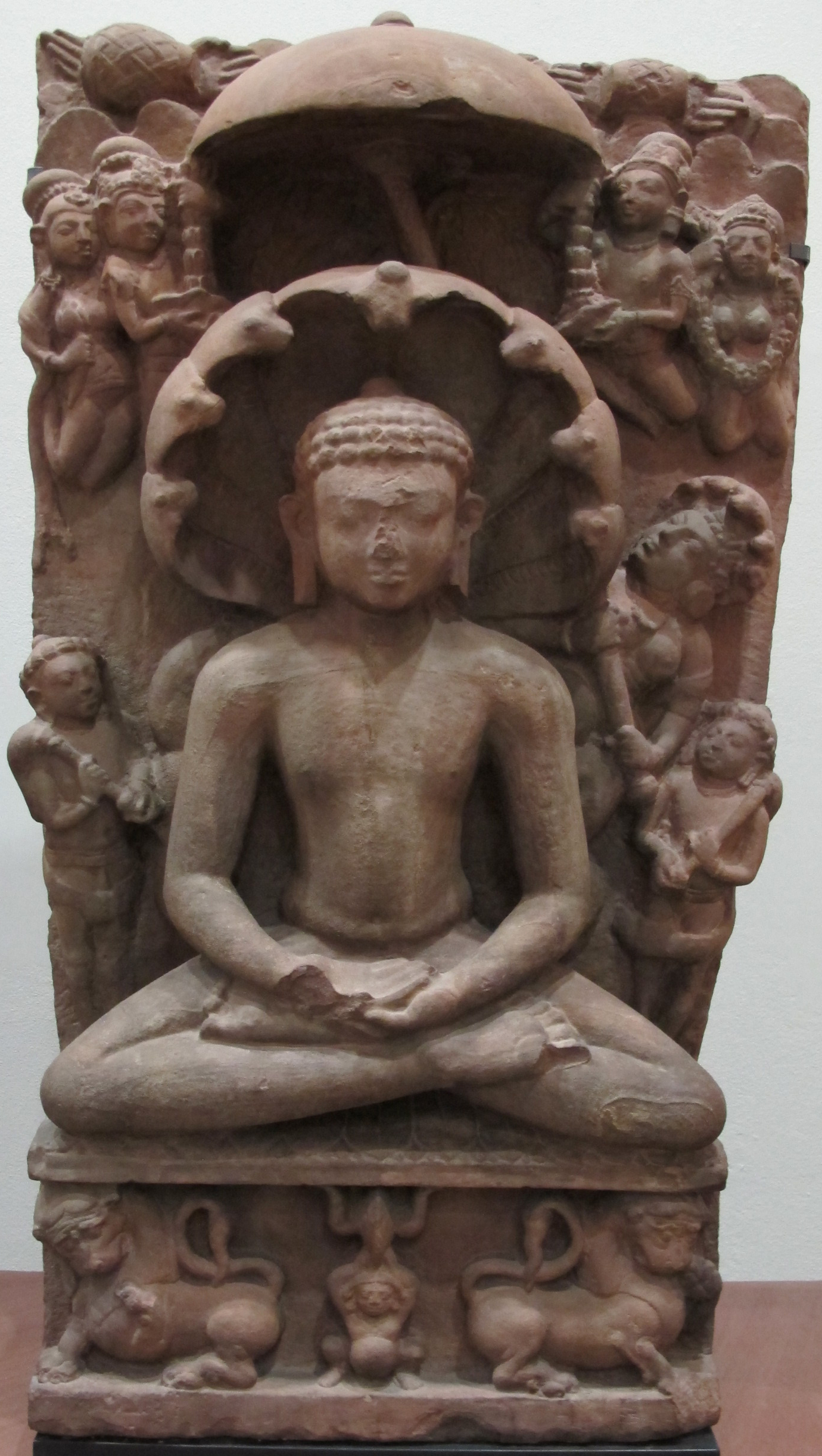
Parshvanatha with Dharanendra

The shared terms include Sangha, Shramana (monk), Shravaka (Householder in Jainism, Buddha's disciple in Buddhism), Jina (Tirthankara in Jainism, Buddha in Buddhism), Chaitya, Stupa, Pudgala (Matter in Jainism, soul in Buddhism) etc. Early Jainism used stupas, although the practice mostly (but not completely) was abandoned later.

== Similarities ==
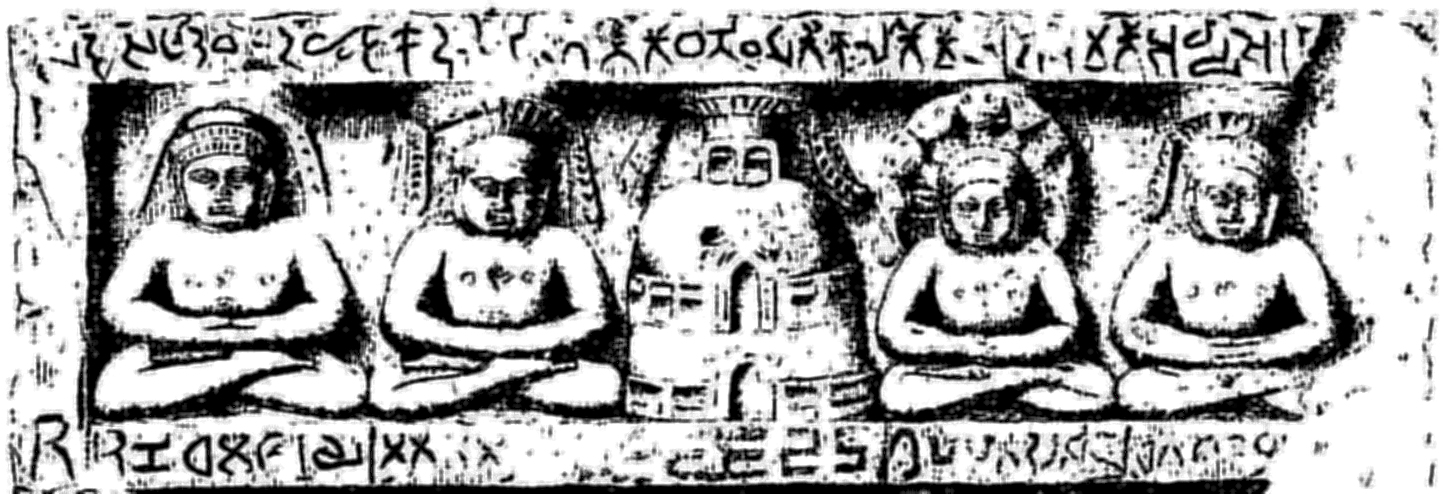
Jain Stupa, Kankali Tila

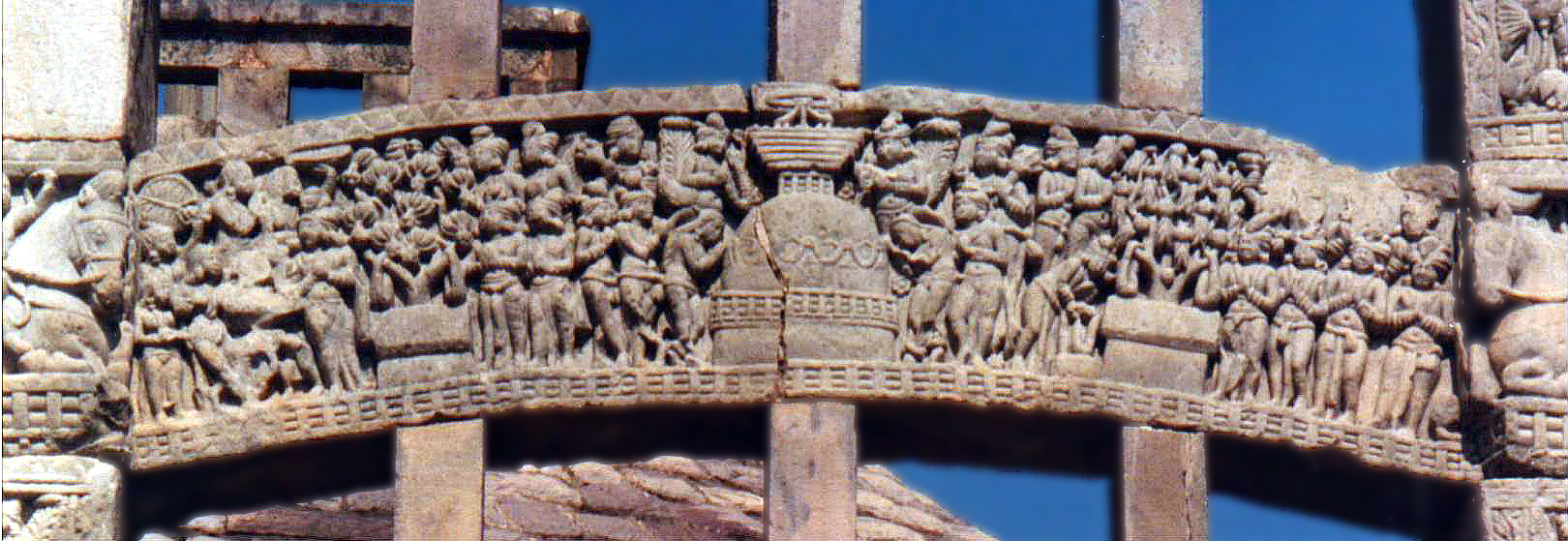
Buddhist stupa worship, Sanchi

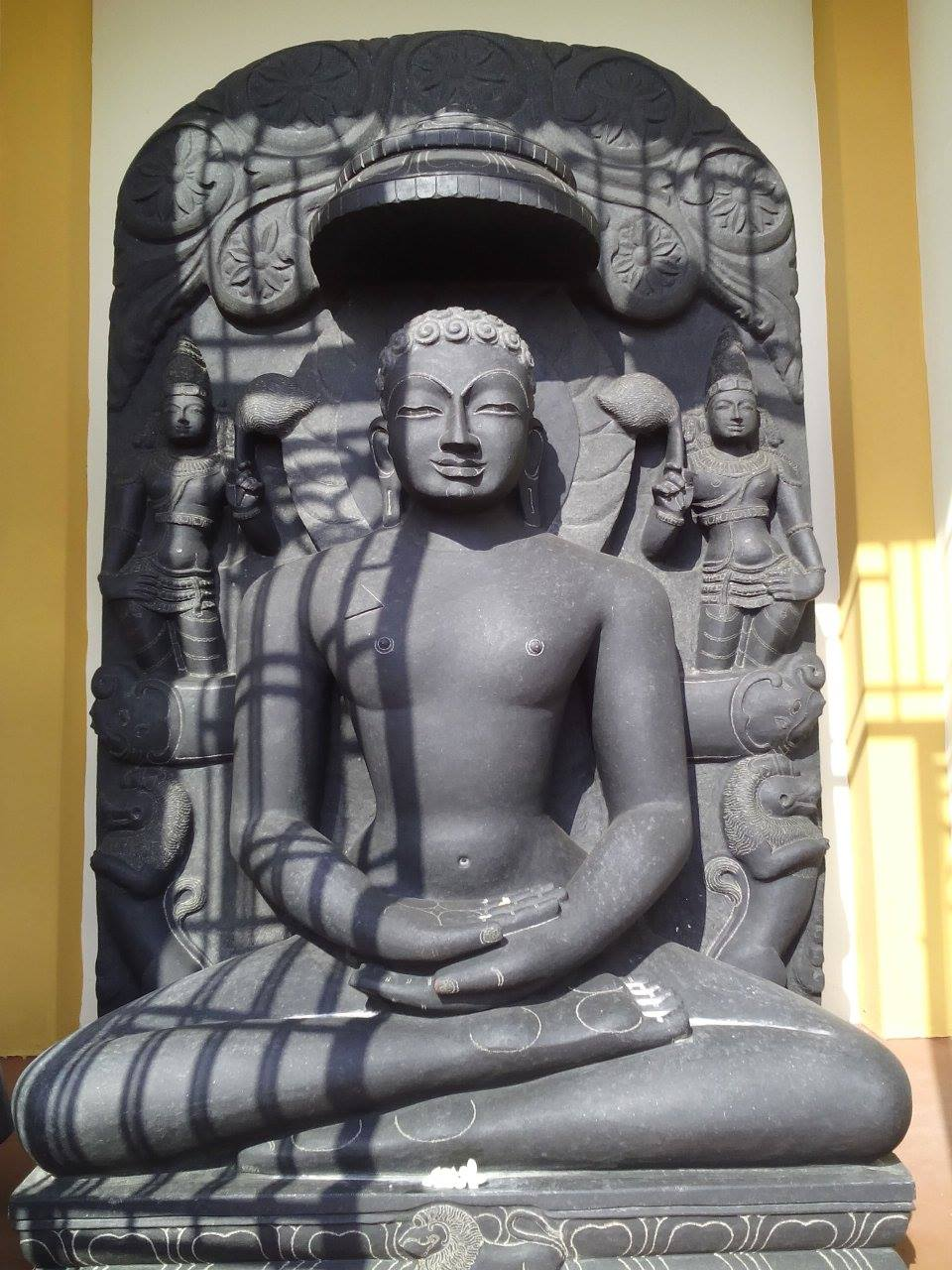
Mahaveer - Nagamalai Puthukottai, Tamil Nadu, ardha-padmasana

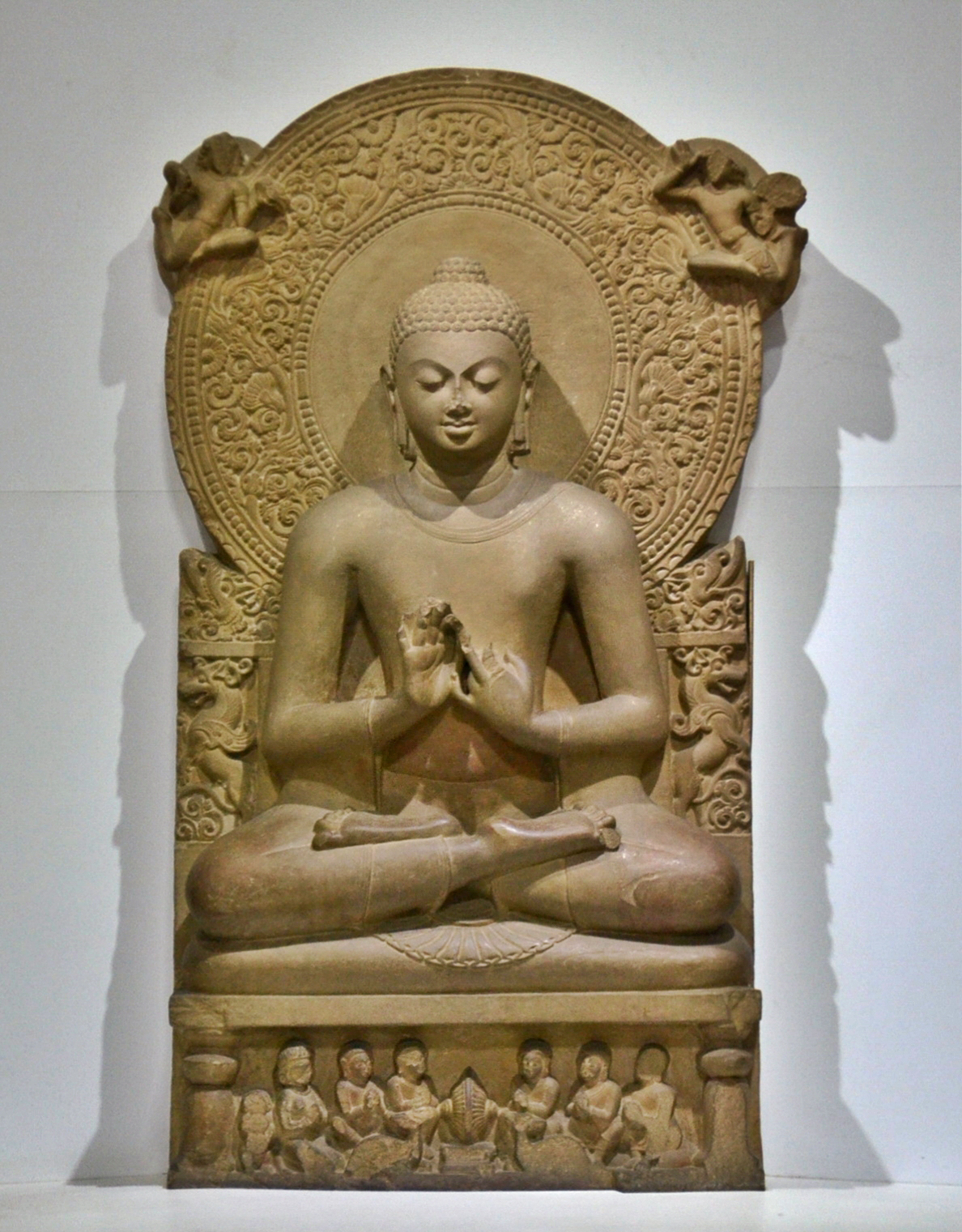
Buddha in Sarnath Museum in padmasana

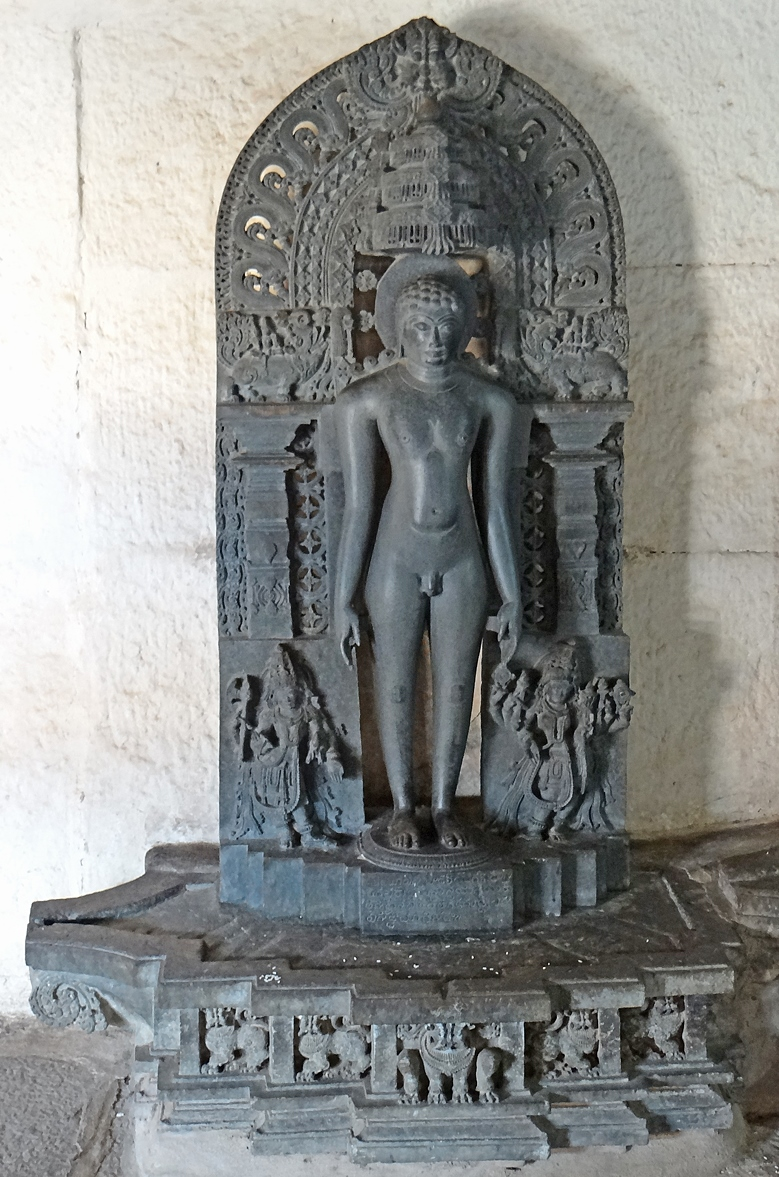
Tirthankara Sravanabelgola, Kayotsarga sana

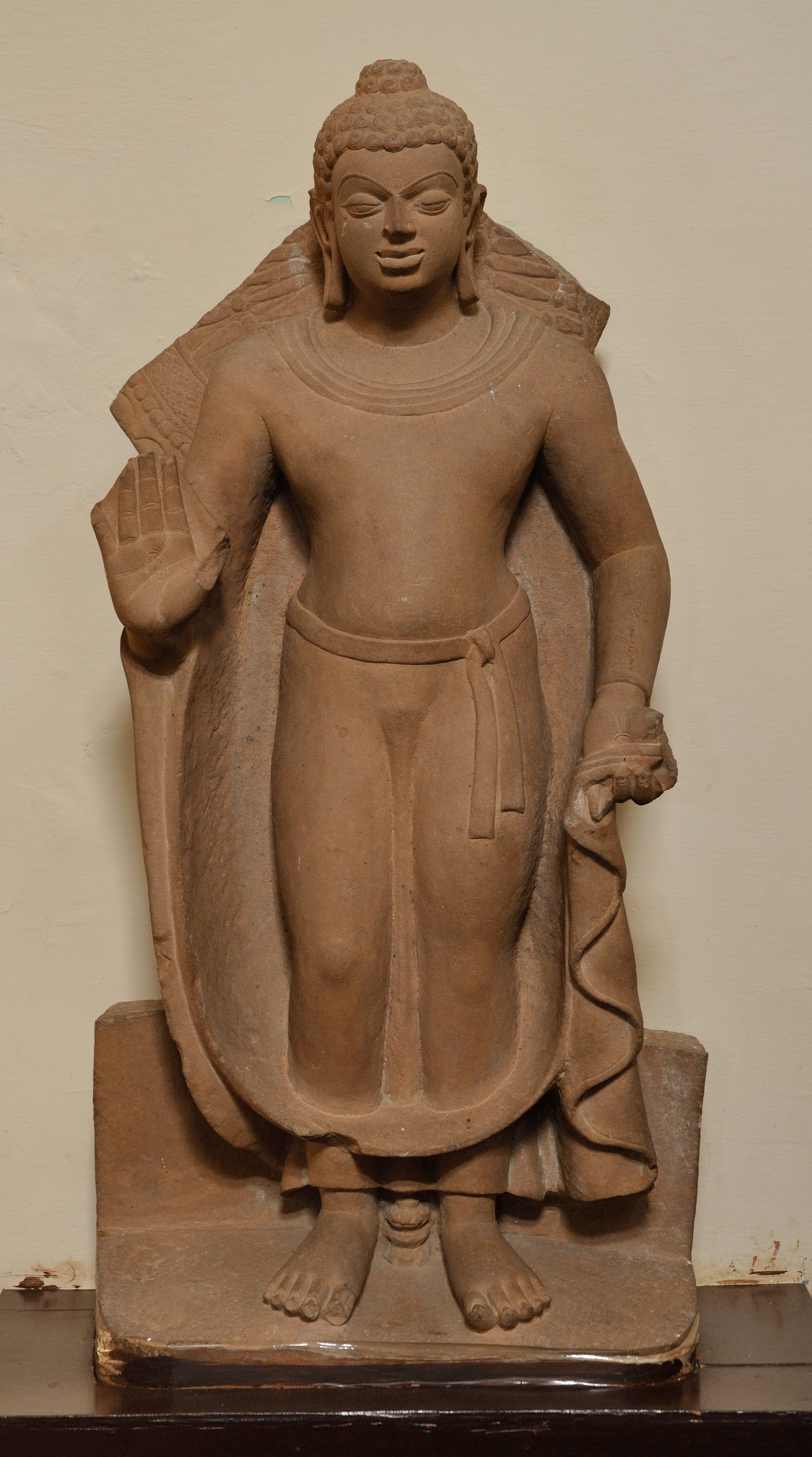
Buddha - Kushan Period, standing

In Jainism, the way of liberation is the ford (tirtha), and Tirthankaras "those making the ford" (from samsara to moksha) are supreme teachers. The same concept is found in Buddhism, which says that through enlightenment (bodhi) an individual crosses the river of samsara to attain liberation. Both religions deny the existence of a creator god. Buddhism and Jainism evince a shared belief in the existence of geographical regions beyond the parameters of Bharatavarsha, access to which could not be gained by ordinary human beings.

Karakandu, a Pratyekabuddha in both Jainism and Buddhism, is a rare personality that is shared between Jainism and Buddhism. The Jain text Isibhasiyam mentions Vajjiyaputra, Mahakashyap and Sariputra among the rishis.

The Jain community (or Jain sangha) consists of monastics, munis (male ascetics) and aryikas (female ascetics) and householders, śhrāvaks (laymen) and śrāvakīs (laywomen). Buddhism has a similar organization: the community consists of renunciate bhikkhus and bhikkhunis and male and female laypersons, or Upāsaka and Upāsikā, who take vows for lay life.

Jain and Buddhist iconography can be similar. In north India, the sitting Jain and Buddhist images are in padmasana, whereas in South India both Jain and Buddhist images are in ardha-padmasana (also termed virasana in Sri Lanka). However the Jain images are always samadhi mudra, whereas the Buddha images can also be in bhumi-sparsha, dharam-chakra-pravartana and other mudras. The standing Jain images are always in khadgasana or kayotsarga asana.

== Differences ==
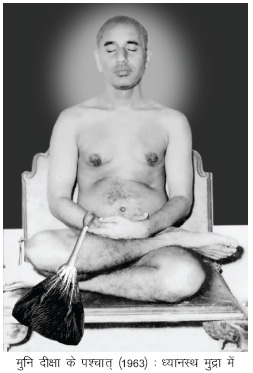
Digambara Jain monk, India

Jainism has refined the non-violence (Ahimsa) doctrine to an extraordinary degree where it is an integral part of the Jain culture. Jain vegetarianism, for example, is driven by the principle of not harming any animals and both lay and mendicants are predominantly vegetarian. In Buddhism, Mahayana monks in China, Japan (see Shojin-ryori), Korea and Vietnam are vegetarian; however, vegetarianism is not required for lay Buddhists. In the Theravāda tradition as well as prohibiting human, elephant, horse, dog, snake, lion, tiger and anything uncooked; the Buddha is quoted in their monastic rules as saying that any animal that is suspected of being killed intentionally for them should be avoided.

Early Jainism and Buddhism differed in their understanding of karma. Early Jain doctrine regarded physical activity as karmically binding because it could harm living beings, but Buddhist texts define karma mainly as intention.

Although both Buddhists and Jain had orders of nuns, Buddhist Pali texts record the Buddha saying that a woman has the ability to obtain nirvana in the dharma and Vinaya. According to Digambara Jains, women are capable of spiritual progress but must be reborn as a man in order to attain final spiritual liberation, this being because Jain nuns cannot be nude and so still have some attachments. The religious texts of the Śvētāmbaras mention that liberation is attainable by both men and women.

The Anekantavada doctrine is another key difference between Jainism and Buddhism. The Buddha taught the Middle Way, rejecting extremes of the answer "it is" or "it is not" to metaphysical questions. The Mahavira, in contrast, accepted both "it is" and "it is not", with "perhaps" qualification and with reconciliation.

Jainism discourages monks and nuns from staying in one place for long, except for 4 months in the rainy season (chaturmas). Thus, most Jain monks and nuns keep wandering, staying in a place for only a few days. Some Theravada Buddhist monks also observe vassa rules, but often they stay in one monastery.

== See also ==
- Kundalakesi
- Bhadda Kundalakesa
- Neelakesi
- Index of Buddhism-related articles
- Indian religions
- History of Jainism
- Secular Buddhism
