= Five Minor Epics =

Tamil epic poems

The Five Minor Epics (Tamil: Ainchirukāppiyaṅkaḷ) are five Tamil epics according to later Tamil literary tradition. They are Neelakesi, Culamani, Naga Kumara Kaviyam, Udayana Kumara Kaviyam, and Yashodhara Kaviyam. Of these, only Culamani and Yashodhara Kaviyam have been published completely. While certain information is available on Neelakesi, and Udayana Kumara Kaviyam, Naga Kumara Kaviyam is not extant and is known only by mentions in other literary works.

These five epics were written in the post Sangam period and act and provide historical information about the society, religions, culture and academic life of Tamil people over that period.

== Classification ==
As per the grammatical book Thandiyalangaram, a literary work should follow the four codes– aram (morality), porul (material), inbam (happiness), and veedu (moksha), to be classified as a major epic. If any of these is missing, the work is considered to be a minor epic. Five works are classified as Great Epics–Silappatikaram, Manimekalai, Cīvaka Cintāmaṇi, Valayapathi and Kundalakesi. Neelakesi, Culamani, Naga Kumara Kaviyam, Udayana Kumara Kaviyam, and Yashodhara Kaviyam are grouped as five minor epics.

== Collection ==
Five Minor Epics
| Name | Author |
|---|---|
| Neelakesi | Unknown |
| Culamani | Tholamozhi Thevar |
| Naga Kumara Kaviyam | Unknown |
| Udayana Kumara Kaviyam | Kandiyar |
| Yashodhara Kaviyam | Vel of Vennaval |

== Neelakesi ==
The author and date of composition of Neelakesi is unknown. It is a polemic work written as a Jain rebuttal to the Buddhist criticism in the Tamil epic Kundalakesi. The epic consists of 10 Charukkam (chapters) and 894 Viruttam meter stanzas. The story of the epic mainly serves as a framework to rebut teachings from other religious philosophies and to extol the tenets of Jainism. It narrates the story of a minor goddess Neelakesi, who becomes a Jain nun, and engages in rival arguments with scholars from various schools of thought such as Ajivika, Lokayatika, Mimamsa, Sankhya, and Vaisesika.

According to the epic, the animal sacrifices in a temple of goddess Kali is stopped in Panchala due to the influence of the Jains. Kali dispatches a local goddess Neelakesi from the Pallava kingdom in the south to seduce the Jain monks. However, Neelakesi fails, and is herself converted into Jainism. She later travels to various places indulging in philosophical debate with rhetoricians of other religious practices starting with the Buddhist Kundalakesi. She debates and defeats several Buddhist rhetoricians like Arkachandra, Moggallana, and even Gautama Buddha himself. As the epic Kundalakesi itself has been lost, Neelakesi which quotes extensively from the original text serves as the main source for reconstructing the earlier.

== Culamani ==
Culamani is a Tamil Jain text written by Tholamozhi Thevar. The introduction of the book states that it was presented to the Pandya king Maravarman Avanisulamani. It is written in viruttam metre similar to Cīvaka Cintāmaṇi, and consists of 2131 quatrains across 12 cantos. The book does not have single major plot. It narrates a Jain version of the story of Balarama and Krishna named as Vijayan and Thivittan respectively. As per the epic, Thivittan is predicted to marry a wizard princess Cuyampirapai, and the wizard king Asvakantan opposes it. It narrates how Thivittan defeats the wizard king, and marries the princess. The epic uses many words in Tamil language, that are not in contemporary use. It also narrates various customs of the Tamil people during the era it was composed such as the influence of soothsayers, practice of swayamvara, and various wars.

== Naga Kumara Kaviyam ==
Naga Kumara Kaviyam is a lost book, whose author is unknown. Information on the epic is available only through secondary sources.

== Udayana Kumara Kaviyam ==
Udayana Kumara Kaviyam consists of six cantos with 367 stanzas. Though the complete details of the author is uncertain, it is considered to be the work of a Jain nun named Kandiyar. It is based on the story of Udayanan from Perun kathai (long story) of the Kongu velir, which was probably based on Brihat katha written in Prakrit, and probably composed in the 13th or 14th century CE. It narrates the story of king Uthayanan of Vathsadesa and his marriage to princess Vasava. The book also details the various customs and practices prevalent in the region from the time of its composition. According to Meenakshi Sundaram Pillai, the work read like the "composition of a high school boy".

== Yashodhara Kaviyam ==
Yashodhara Kaviyam consists of 320 verses divided into five chapters. It was written by a Jain author Vel of Vennaval, probably in the 14th century CE. It is based on the Sanskrit text Yashothara Charitham from the 11th century CE. The epic narrates the story of king Yashodaran and his wife, who die after consuming poison following a sacrifice ritual. The ritual of offering a rooster made of flour was done to pacify Kali due to ill omens surrounding the incest of the queen (Yashodaran's wife), and was against Jain traditions. They took re-birth as brother and sister, Apayarusi and Apayamathi respectively to Yashomathi, the son of the king Yashodaran. After Yashomathi is made to realise the story behind his parents, he does good by them and both the brother and sister left the world and attain heaven.
