= Neelakesi =

Neelakesi (Tamil: நீலகேசி, romanized: Nīlakēci, lit. 'Woman with blue hair') is a Tamil Jain epic poetry. Tamil literary tradition places it among the five minor epic poems, along with Naga kumara kaviyam, Udhyana kumara Kaviyam, Yasodhara Kaviyam and Soolamani. It is a polemical work written as a Jain rebuttal to the Buddhist criticism in the Great Tamil epic Kundalakesi.

It tells the story of the Jain nun of the same name who was a rival of the Buddhist protagonist of the Kundalakesi. According to the epic, when animal sacrifices of a temple of the Kali in Panchala were stopped due to the influence of the Jains, the Goddess dispatched the local deity Nīli to seduce and destroy the monk responsible for it. However, Nīli herself is converted to Jainism by the monk. Nīlakēci, as she is renamed, travels the country indulging in philosophical debate with rhetoricians of other religions. She debates and defeats several Buddhist rhetoricians like Arkachandra, Kundalakesi, Moggallana (Tamil: Mokkala) and even Gautama Buddha himself. Nīlakēci also defeats votaries from other schools of Indian philosophy, including Samkhya, Vaisheshika, Mīmāṃsā and Cārvāka. The story of the epic mainly serves as a framework to present these debates and extol the tenets of Jainism.

The epic and its commentary by the Jain saint Vamanar quote extensively from Kundalakesi to counter Buddhist arguments. Since the original text of the Kundalakesi itself has been lost, the fragments cited in them have served as the main source for reconstructing that work. The name of the epic's author is not known. The epic is made up of 10 Charukkams (chapters) and 894 Viruttam meter stanzas. It has been dated to the later half of the 10th century CE. Vamanar's commentary of Neelakesi shed light on the religious controversies of that period and also mention the names of many other Jain literary works (now lost) like Anjanakesi, Pinkalakesi and Kalakesi.

== See also ==
- Kundalakesi
- Bhadda Kundalakesa
- Buddhism and Jainism
- Tamil literature
