= Culamani =

Tamil epic

Culamani or Sulamani is one of the five minor epic poems of post Sangam era Tamil literature. It was written by Tamil Jain scholar Tolamoli Thevar. The work does not have a single major plot, and consists of 2131 quatrains across 12 cantos.

== Description ==
The text is written in viruttam metre similar to Cīvaka Cintāmaṇi. It consists of 2131 quatrains organised into 12 cantos. Many of the words used in the text are not used in contemporary Tamil language. The text incorporates elements from mythology, and supernatural elements. Though its style is similar to Cintamani, it has an easier and sweeter flow of words. It is mentioned in the Jain inscriptions in Sravanabelagola, and is inline with other classical Jain texts describing pathways to attain moksha.

== Author ==
The text was written by Tamil Jain scholar Tolamoli Thevar. He probably lived after Tiruttakkatēvar, the author of Cintamani and was a follower of Digambara tradition. The introduction of the book states that the book was presented to the Pandya king Maravarman Avanisulamani. The book was first published by Thamotharam Pillai.

== Plot ==
The text does not have a single major plot. It is a Jain version of various stories from the Hindu mythology, and incorporates description of various mythological places. It gives a detailed description of the country side, and narrates various customs of the Tamil people during the era it was composed such as the influence of soothsayers, practice of swayamvara, existence of polygamy, acts of valor, and various wars. It also describes the qualities of an ideal king.

It narrates a Jain version of the story of Balarama and Krishna named as Vijayan and Thivittan respectively. Prajapati was the king of Suramai, whose wives Mikapathi and Saki bore Vijayan and Thivittan respectively. The brothers were known for their beauty and attractiveness. Thivittan was a mahavira in his previous life. A soothsayer predicts that Thivittan will marry a fairy princess in a week. A similar prediction said that fairy princess Cuyampirapai, the daughter of the king of Irathanupuram, will marry a mortal human on earth. The king dispatches Marusi as an envoy to Prajapati, who was initially surprises by the revelation of the prediction, but later consented to the same. However, Achuvakandan, the emperor of the fairy and wizard realm, to whom the kings are subordinates, demands tribute from Prajapati for the same. While Prajapati consents to pay Achuvakandan tribute in gold and jewels as demanded, Thivittan refused to accede to the request, stating that Suramai was not subordinate to the wizard realm.

Achuvakandan sent a member of his court disguised as a lion to attack Suramai. Vijayan and Thivittan search for the lion on the orders of Prajapati, and kill it after a brief fight in a cave. As predicted by the soothsayer, the king of Irathanupuram heard the stories of valor, and married off Cuyampirapai to Thivittan. As it happened against the wishes of Achuvakandan, he became angry and sent his army to attack Suramai. In the ensuing war, Thivittan, who had supernatural powers, killed the wizard emperor. He later made his father-in-law as the new emperor of the fairy realm. Thivittan rules the kingdom along with his father and his brother. He and Cuyampirapai have a son Amirthasenan and daughter Minjothimalai. Thivittan's sister marries his wife's brother Arukakirthi, and gives birth to a son and a daughter. Amirthasenan and Minjothimalai are married to their uncle's daughter and son respectively, thus intertwining both the realms and starting a new lineage.

After enjoying a mortal life of sensuous pleasure, Prajapati decides to abdicate his throne, and move to the forest to live as an ascetic. He organises a ritual festival in honor of the Jain deity Aruha, who reveals the pathway to attain moksha.
