= Naga Kumara Kaviyam =

Tamil epic

Naga Kumara Kaviyam is one of the five minor epic poems of Sangham literature written by Jain monk. It is a lost work, known only by references. Its author and time are unknown.
