= Yashodhara Kaviyam =

Tamil epic

Yashodhara Kaviyam is one of the five minor epic poems of Sangham literature.

== Description ==
It consists of 320 verses divided into 5 chapters. It was written by a Jain author Vel of Vennaval. It was composed in the 14th century. The Jain influence can be seen through the prayers in this epic. Its considered as a traditional Jain work, and involves the concepts of humanity being condemned to an endless cycle of birth.
