= Udayana Kumara Kaviyam =

Tamil epic

Udayana Kumara Kaviyam is one of the five minor epic poems of Sangham literature. Though the name of the author is unknown, it is considered to be the work of a Jaina nun named Kandiyar. It is a Jaina treatise in 6 cantos with 369 stanzas. According to T.P. Meenakshi Sundaram the work "reads like the composition of a high school boy". The poem is about the story of Udayana in the Perunkadai and hence is an adaptation of Peru-n-katai with smaller changes.
