= Valayapathi =

Tamil epic poem

Valaiyapadhi (Tamil: வளையாபதி, romanized: Vaḷaiyāpati, lit. 'Unbending Man'; transl. Strong Man), also spelled Valayapathi, is one of the five great Tamil epics, but one that is almost entirely lost. It is a story of a father who has two wives, abandons one who gives birth to their son, and the son grows up and seeks his real father. The dominant emotion of this epic is love, and its predominant object is the inculcation of Jain principles and doctrines.

Palm-leaf manuscripts of the epic likely existed until the 19th-century, but presently only uncertain fragments of the epic are known from commentaries and the 14th-century anthology Purattirattu. Based on these fragments, the epic appears to be the story of a merchant with an overseas trading business who married two women. He abandoned one, who later gives birth to his son. He has children with the other wife too. The abandoned son is bullied by overseas kids for not knowing the name of his father. His mother then discloses the father's name. The son travels and confronts his father, who first refuses to acknowledge him. Then, with the aid of a goddess, he brings his mother whose presence proves his claim. The father accepts the boy, and helps him start his own merchant business.

The surviving stanzas of the epic, and the commentaries that mention Valayapathi, suggest that it was partly a text that was disputing and criticizing other Indian religions, that it supported the ideologies found in early Jainism, such as asceticism, horrors at meat-eating (Non-violence), and monastic aversion to women (Celibacy). It is therefore "almost certain" to be a Jain epic, written by a Tamil Jain ascetic, states Kamil Zvelebil – a Tamil literature scholar. According to Zvelebil, it was probably composed in or about the 10th-century CE.

== Sources ==
Of the five great epics, Valayapathi and Kundalakesi are not available in full. Only fragments quoted in other literary works and commentaries have survived. The loss of the epic happened as recent as late 19th century CE. Tamil scholar and publisher of classical literature, U. V. Swaminatha Iyer mentions in his autobiography that he once saw a palm leaf manuscript of Valayapathi in the Thiruvaiyaru library of his teacher, Meenakshi Sundaram Pillai. However, when he later searched for it for publication, it had disappeared. Another Tamil scholar V. Subramania Mudaliar has also written about seeing a palm leaf manuscript of Valayapathi. The epic has been mentioned by name in the Parimelalagar's commentary (14th century CE) of Tirukkuṛaḷ and a 12th-century commentary of Ottakoothar' Thakkayagaparani. Currently, 72 stanzas of the epic have been recovered from various secondary sources. Fragments have been found in commentaries of Yapperungala Viruthi Ceyyul and Ilampuranar's and Nachinarkiniyar's commentaries of Tolkāppiyam. Adiyarkkunallar's commentary on Cilappatikaram and an anonymous commentary of Yapperungalam contain 3 and 2 stanzas of the epic respectively. Three stanzas have been found in. Majority of the currently available verses (66 of them) are found in the 14th century anthology Purathirattu.

== Content ==
Valayapathi's story cannot be discerned from the currently available fragments of the epic. However, some scholars contend that the epic's story has been retold in the 35th chapter of Vanikapuranam written by Chintamani Pulavar in 1855. Chintamani Pulavar describes the chapter as the story of "Vaira Vanikan Valayapathi" (Valayapathi the Diamond merchant) of the Aimperumkaappiyam (five great epics). But the text itself does not contain the word Valayapathi. Tamil scholars M. Arunachalam and Kamil Zvelebil consider this hypothesis as doubtful. The content of the recovered verses are consistent with the ideals of Jainism and have led to the conclusion that this epic is a Jain religious work. Rejection of worldly pleasures, advocation of asceticism, misanthropy and praise for chastity, horror at meat-eating, the vision of constant change and transiency all point to the epic's author being a Jain monk. The 345th verse of Tirukkuṛaḷ is quoted in the epic.

According to Tamil scholar S. Vaiyapuri Pillai, Valayapathi is one of the earliest works done in the Viruttham metre. The quality and beauty of the epic has been praised by Adiyarkkunallar who quotes from it and praises its quality of poetry in his commentary of Cilappatikaram.

== Time period ==
Valayapathi has been dated to the early 10th century CE by Vaiyapuri Pillai, while Arunachalam has dated it to the early 9th century.

== Genre ==
Tamil literary tradition places Valayapathi among the five great epics of Tamil literature, alongside such works as Silappatikaram, Manimegalai, Civaka Cintamani and Kundalakesi. It is called a "Aimperumkappiyam" (lit. Five large epics), a genre that is first mentioned in a later century Mayilainathar's commentary of Nannūl. Mayilainathar does not mention the names of the five epics. The names of the epics are first mentioned in the late 18th century - early 19th century work Thiruthanikaiula. Earlier works like the 17th century poem Tamil vidu thoothu mention the great epics as Panchkavyams.

== See also ==
- Tamil literature
- Five Great Epics
