= Cīvaka Cintāmaṇi =

One of the five great Tamil epics

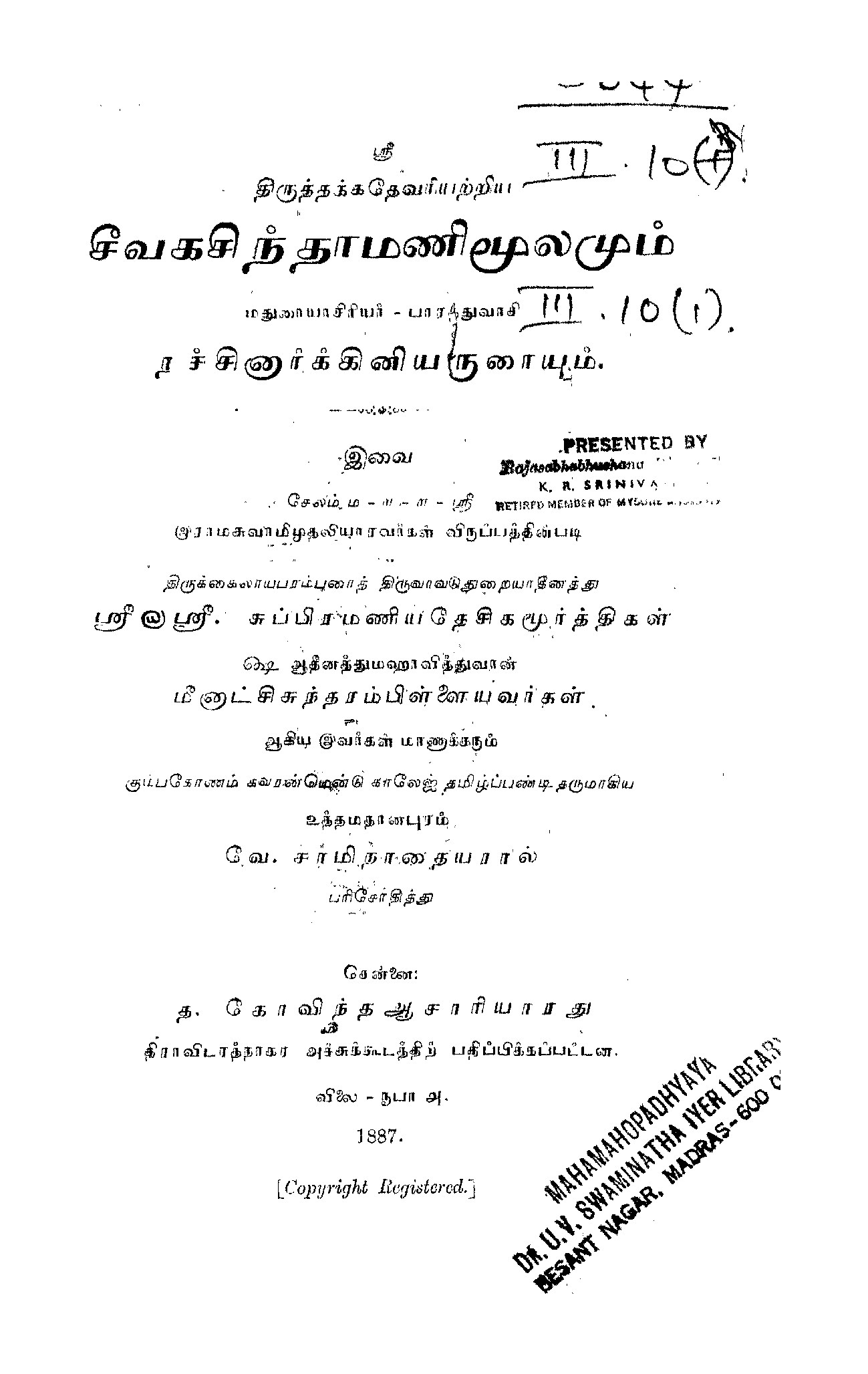
Cīvaka Cintāmaṇi book in printed format

Civaka Cintamani (Tamil: சீவக சிந்தாமணி, romanized: Cīvaka Cintāmaṇi, lit. 'Jivaka, the Fabulous Gem'), also spelled as Jivaka Chintamani, is one of the five great Tamil epics. Authored by a Madurai-based Jain ascetic Tiruttakkatēvar in the early 10th century, the epic is a story of a prince who is the perfect master of all arts, perfect warrior and perfect lover with numerous wives. The Civaka Cintamani is also called the Mana Nool (Tamil: மண நூல், romanized: Maṇa nūl, lit. 'book of marriages'). The epic is organized into 13 cantos and contains 3,145 quatrains in viruttam poetic meter. Its Jain author is credited with 2,700 of these quatrains, the rest by his guru and another anonymous author.

The epic begins with the story of a treacherous coup, where the king helps his pregnant queen escape in a peacock-shaped flying machine but is himself killed. The queen gives birth to a boy. She hands him over to a loyal servant to raise, becoming a nun herself. The boy, Jivaka, grows up into a man, rather a superman, one who is perfect in every art, every skill, every field of knowledge. He excels in war and erotics, kills his enemies, wins over and marries every pretty girl he meets, then regains the kingdom his father had lost. After enjoying power, sex and begetting many sons with his numerous wives, the epic ends with him renouncing the world and becoming a Jain ascetic.

The Tamil epic Civakacintamani is probably a compilation of many older, fantasy-filled unreal Tamil folk stories. The poet skillfully couples the martial adventures of the extraordinarily talented superman with graphic sexual descriptions of his affairs, along with lyrical interludes of his virtues such as kindness, duty, tenderness and affection for all living beings. The epic's love scenes are sensuous and loaded with double entendre and metaphors. The poetic style of the Civakacintamani epic is found in Tamil poetic literature that followed among Hindu and Jain scholars, attesting to its literary significance.

Portions of the epic were ceremonially recited by members of the Tamil Jain community in the 19th century. Rare copies of its palm-leaf manuscripts were preserved by Tamil Hindus. U V Swaminatha Aiyar – a Shaiva pundit and Tamil scholar, discovered two copies of it in 1880 at the encouragement of the chief abbot of a Shaiva Hindu monastery in Kumbhakonam, one copy given by Tamil enthusiast Ramaswami Mutaliyar (Note: Mutaliyar was from the Vellalar community, traditionally farmers and the champions of Tamil literary arts and learning.) and the other by the monastery. Aiyar studied the epic's manuscripts under oil lamps, with guidance from Appasami Nayinar – a Jaina community leader, established a critical edition and published the first paper version of the epic in 1887. (Note: Kamil Zvelebil mentions the Hindu discrimination against this text around 18th century, when it was one of the texts that Caminata Tecikar calls as "inferior writings which one should not read wasting one's time". However, Eva Wilden states that the Tecikar note has been quoted out of its context, and Tecikar's note was in the context of understanding and interpreting Sutra 7 given the standard Tamil references for grammar and interpretation. A careful reread suggests Tecikar did not mean it that way, states Wilden.)

== Author and date ==
Civaka Cintamani – as it has survived into the modern era – is an epic of 3,145 stanzas, each stanza of four highly lyrical lines. According to the final verses of the epic, it consists of 2,700 (86%) verses. According to the 14th-century Naccinarkkiniyar commentary, the 2,700 verses were composed by Thiruthakkadevar (Tiruttakkatevar) of the Chola race who in his youth became a Jain ascetic and moved to Madurai. (Note: According to James Ryan, Tiruttakkatevar was an ascetic of the Digambara subtradition of Jainism.) The authorship of the remaining quatrains is unknown. According to a Jain tradition, 2 of the quatrains were composed by the teacher and counselor of Thiruthakkadevar, while the rest were anonymously added. The larger Tamil tradition believes that 445 quatrains were composed by Kantiyar, a poetess and inserted into the original. The entire epic is sometimes credited to just Thiruthakkadevar by casual writers.

Some non-Jaina Tamil poets, states Zvelebil, have questioned whether Thiruthakkadevar was really a Jain ascetic, since one of the mandatory five mahāvratas (great vows) for ascetics in Jainism is strict abstinence from sex in "action, words and thought", but the epic is loaded with sexually-explicit verses. According to the tradition, Thiruthakkadevar proved his ascetic purity by an ordeal.

According to a note in 1857 by the colonial-era missionary P Percival, his acquaintances informed him that Thiruthakkadevar, also called Tirudevar, was a learned Jain scholar who lived 2,000 years ago, and who was acquainted with Akattiyam and Tolkappiyam, the celebrated Tamil grammar works. He is also believed to have deep acquaintance in Sanskrit and Vedas. His epic, said Percival, was quoted by Tamil grammarians because it was believed to be of "undoubted authority" on Tamil language.

Later Tamil literature scholarship places Thiruthakkadevar about 1,000 years later than Percival's colonial-era note. The story in Civakacintamani, states Kamil Zvelebil, is the story found in the older Sanskrit text Kshattracudamani by Vadibhasinha, which itself was based on Gunabhadra's Uttarapurana. The latter text can be firmly dated to 897–898 CE (derived from Hindu calendar) based on the notes in its prasasti. Therefore, the epic was composed after 898 CE. It is now broadly accepted by scholars that the Civakacintamani epic was composed in the early 10th century on a foundation of the 9th-century Sanskrit originals.

== Contents ==
The work contains 3147 quatrains and is divided into 13 cantos called illambakams (Skt: lambaka). The 13 cantos were summarized in 1857 by the Christian missionary Peter Percival as follows:

- Namagal Ilambagam contains 408 verses detailing the story prior to the birth of the hero, Jivakan. It also details his birth, his mother fleeing from the assassin who murdered her husband, the king and the rescue of baby Jivakan from the forest by a merchant Chitty.
- Kovindiyar Ilambagam relates to the exploits of young Jivakan; his bravery detailed when he attacks the gang of freebooters who loot the city; his marriage to Kovindeyar, the daughter of a citizen in the city named Pasukavalam who gets impressed by his bravery. The section has 84 stanzas.
- Kandarvatatteyar Illambagam is derived from the celebrated musician, Tatteyar whose skill on Veena, an Indian string instrument was almost unrivalled. She was resolute not to marry anyone until her challenge is surpassed. Jivaka won the competition. She and Jivaka marry. The events are accounted in 358 stanzas in this section.
- Gundmaleyar Ilambagam contains 415 stanzas and presents two young women namely Gunamelai and Churamanjiri of high family contended for their superiority in possessing scented powders. The identical scents were difficult to differentiate and when Jivagan did it, Gunamelai agreed to marry him. Sudarshana Jakshadeva, who got transformed to a dog due to a sin is restored to his former form by Jivaka. Churamanjiri is rescued by Jivaka from an angry charging elephant.
- Pathumeiyar Ilambagam narrates the travel of Jivaka to foreign lands in 246 verses. Jivaka saves Pathumai when she was bitten by a serpent while collecting flowers. They get married.
- Kemasariyar Ilambagam contains 145 verses and it describes the visit of Jivaka to Kshemadesam where he performs austerities that gains him admiration from the king. Kshema Sundari and Jivaka get married.
- Kanagamaleyar Ilambagam depicts the hero in a place called Susandesam where the king suspends on a high mark, promising to give his daughter in marriage to the person who succeeds in displacing the mark with an arrow. Jivaka wins the competition and marries the king's daughter namely Chisanti. The heroics is depicted in 30 stanzas.
- Kimaleyar Ilambagam has 107 stanzas, where Jivaka proceeds to Nanaadu where he meets his mother in Tandakarenyam and salutes her. When he returns to the city, a merchant, who gets wealthy on account of Jivaka bestows his daughter Vimalei in marriage.
- In the ninth ilambagam, Jivaka marries Churamanjari, who once vowed not to marry anyone during the perfume episode.
- Manamagal Ilambagam contains 358 stanzas and narrates the victory of Jivaga in marrying the daughter of his maternal uncle, the king of Videkam. Jivaka wins the competition of hitting the target with arrow and his fame spreads across. The assassin who killed Jivaka's father plans to seize him and put him to death, but Jivaga wins and ascends the throne of his ancestors.
- Purmagal Illambagam contains 51 stanzas that narrates the conquest of Jivaka of the dominions of his father's assassin. The country was called Emangadesam.
- Ilakaneiyar Illambagam contains 221 verses describing the nuptials of Jivaga and his maternal uncle's daughter, Illakanei.
- Mutti Illambagam is the last canto of the epic. Jivaka renounces, partitions his dominions to his sons, and becomes an ascetic.

Percival noted that the Jivaka story is also found in the older Sanskrit Jaina text, called Maha Purana and that the Jains did not consider it to be a part of their 18 celebrated Puranas.

=== Story ===
The epic begins with the story of a treacherous coup by a minister of the king. The king had given temporary responsibility for the capital while the king and queen were traveling. The king helps his pregnant queen escape in a peacock-shaped flying machine but gets himself killed by the minister's army. The queen gives birth to a boy as she hid in a remote cremation grounds. She hands over her baby she named Jivaka to a loyal servant to raise, becoming a nun herself. The boy grows up into a man, rather a superman, one who is perfect in every art, every skill, every field of knowledge. Jivaka the superhero excels in war and erotics, kills his enemies, wins over and marries every beautiful girl he meets, then regains the kingdom his father had lost. After enjoying power, sex and begetting many sons with his numerous wives, the epic ends with Jivaka renouncing the world and converting into a Jaina ascetic.

The epic concludes that all the worldly pleasures Jivaka enjoyed was nothing but illusions distracting him from the path of spiritual salvation.

== Significance ==
Sex in Civaka Cintamani

His garlands ripped,
the saffron on him was ruined,
his chaplet was charred,
– because
of the enthusiasm of intercourse,
her girdles broke,
her beautiful anklets cried out,
and the honeybees were scared off,
as the young couple made love.

— Civaka Cintamani 1349
Translator: James Ryan, Erotic Excess and Sexual Danger in Civakacintamani

The epic is unusual in many respects. Authored by a Jain ascetic, it presents a story that is unlike the generally accepted view of historic Jainism being an "austerely ascetic" religious tradition. The hero of the epic, Jivaka, indulges in a life of sensual pursuits with numerous women, marries many women and carries out a sexual affair with a dancing girl without marrying her, violently kills his enemies including those who had participated or supported the coup against his father, seeks and enjoys power. Thus, his life is anything but one of non-violence, sexual fidelity, restraint and non-possessiveness – some of the traditionally understood virtues for householders in Jainism. Ultimately, the hero converts into a Jain ascetic, yet the epic writer is generally accepted to be a Jaina ascetic. (Note: The epic is a dense collection of erotic descriptions, and to some unused to the Indian literary culture and openness, the explicit descriptions seem obscene. According to James Ryan – a professor of Asian Studies and Religion, "the Digambaras, with the rigorously ascetic views, would seem unlikely candidates for the creation of a text of highly erotic character such as the Civacintamani.") The epic has explicit and lyrical descriptions of sensual gratifications and sex. According to David Shulman, the epic questions the long-held scholarly views of Jainism and the teachings of its most celebrated historic scholars. According to James Ryan, a proposed explanation is that the Digambara Jains were living with Hindus, the epic was influenced by the Hindu beliefs and outlook on life, and it reflects a synthetic work that fused the values and virtues of Hinduism and Jainism. An alternate explanation, states Ryan, is that the epic includes explicit eros and graphic descriptions of sex not to praise or recommend such values or practices in the way some early Hindu texts do, the epic includes this so as to examine and criticize it from the Jain perspective.

According to Arathoon, the work stands as a proof of secular outlook of Chola kings during the period. Though they were Hindus, they encouraged the Jain education and arts. The epic was influential on other Tamil poets, and it "may have served as a poetic model for both Kamban Ramayana and Cekkilar", states David Shulman.

The epic hints of no persecution or violence between the Tamil Shaiva and Jaina community. Its composition, reception, and influence in the Hindu community suggest that the Jain–Hindu relations in the Tamil region were cordial and collaborative at least through the 10th century.

The Tamil epic is notable for the high number of Sanskrit loan words, likely because it is a late medieval text. It is also notable, according to Vaidyanathan for chronologically being the first Tamil text where the caste-related term Shudra appears (Tamil: cūttiraṇ) in verse 1287, line 4.

It is considered one of the five great Tamil epics according to later Tamil literary tradition, the others being Manimekalai, Silappadikaram, Valayapathi and Kundalakesi. In its form, it anticipates the Ramayana of Kambar. Cīvaka Cintāmaṇi was much appreciated by the Chola king who was its patron and was well received at his Chola court. It has been admired for its poetic form, appealing story-line, and theological message.

== Manuscripts and translations ==
U. V. Swaminatha Iyer (1855-1942 CE) – a practicing Shaiva Brahmin and Tamil scholar, discovered two copies of the epic in 1880 at the encouragement of his guru, the chief abbot of a Shaiva Hindu monastery in Kumbhakonam. The first copy came from Tamil enthusiast Ramaswami Mutaliyar whom the abbot had introduced to Iyer (also spelled Aiyar), and the other came from the monastery's large collection of ancient texts. The palm-leaf manuscripts decay and degrade relatively quickly in the tropical climate of south India, and must be re-copied every few decades or about a century, a step that introduces scribal errors. The two copies of the manuscripts were different, and one included commentary from the 14th century. Aiyar studied the two versions of the manuscripts under oil lamps. With help from Appasami Nayinar – a Jaina community leader, Aiyar established a critical edition and published the first paper print of the epic in 1887.

Between 2005 and 2019, James Ryan and G Vijayavenugopal published the English translation of Civaka Cintamani in three volumes. (Note: Verses 1–1164 were translated by James Ryan, the remaining translations were a collaborative work and appeared in two volumes in 2012 and 2019.)

== See also ==
- Tamil Jain
- Five Great Epics
