= Kundalakesi =

One of the five great Tamil epics

Kundalakesi (Tamil: குண்டலகேசி Kuṇṭalakēci, lit. "woman with curly hair"), also called Kuntalakeciviruttam, is a Tamil Buddhist epic written by Nathakuthanaar, likely sometime in the 10th century. The epic is a story about love, marriage, getting tired with the married partner, murder and then discovering religion.

The Kundalakesi epic has partially survived into the modern age in fragments, such as in commentaries written centuries later. From these fragments, it appears to be a tragic love story about a Hindu or Jain girl of merchant caste named Kundalakesi who falls in love with Kalan – a criminal on a death sentence. The girl's rich merchant father gets the criminal pardoned and freed, the girl marries him. Over time, their love fades and they start irritating each other. During an argument, Kundalakesi reminds him of his criminal past which angers Kalan. A few days later, he invites her to a hike up a hill. When they reach the top, he tells her that he will now kill her. The wife requests that he let circumambulate him – her husband – three times like a god, before her death. He agrees. When she is behind him, she pushes her husband over into the valley below and kills him. She feels remorse for killing the boy she once fell in love with and someone she had married. She meets teachers of various religious traditions, adopts Buddhism, renounces and becomes a nun, then achieves Nirvana. Sections of the story are very similar to the Buddhist Pali Therigatha legend. (Note: In Therigatha, the characters are Sattuka [Kalan] and Bhadra [Kundalakesi]. However, the story has a few differences. Bhadra is a Hindu girl, who first converts to Jainism, then converts to Buddhism. Several variant versions exist in other regional Pali and Sanskrit literature.)

The Kuntalakeci is one of Aim-perum-kappiyam (lit. "five great kavyas", or The Five Great Epics of Tamil Literature) according to the later Tamil literary tradition. The surviving stanza fragments of the epic are in kalitturai poetic meter. It was likely an epic drama-musical for Tamil Buddhist audience in and about the 10th century. The work likely ridiculed Jainism and Hinduism, attracting commentaries and debate. Various Tamil scholars dated between 10th- and 16th-centuries have called the Buddhist epic as a work of tarukkavadam (polemics and controversy).

== Author ==
The epic was authored by a Buddhist poet named Nathakuthanaar (Skt: Nathagupta), likely born in a merchant class. Nothing is known about his life or which century he lived in. A Pali language Vinaya commentary titled Vimativinodani states the author of Kundalakesi was a Buddhist elder named Nathakuthanaar. It states:

"Formerly in Tamil country an elder named Nathakuthanaar compiled a work in Tamil containing the story of Kundalakesi, for refuting heretical doctrines, adducing arguments for demolishing the views advanced by non-Buddhists."

== Sources and content ==
Of the five great epics, the manuscripts of Valayapathi and Kundalakesi have not survived in full. Only fragments quoted in other literary works and commentaries have survived. Only 19 stanzas of Kundalakesi have survived in Purattirattu, a few initial stanzas in the commentary on Takkayakapparani Kalikkukkuli, several stanzas are found in a 16th-century commentary on Civanana Cittiyar Parapakkam, plus 25 stanzas and 180 fragments of the epic's line in a commentary to Nilakeci.

An additional five have been recovered, but whether they were part of Kundalakesi has not been proven conclusively. The 19 verses recovered have been found in the commentaries for Tolkāppiyam, Veera Sozhiyam, Yapperungalam , Thakkayagaparani, Sivagnana Siddhiyar Parapakkam (Thirvorriyur Gnanaprakasar's commentary), the epic Neelakesi (Nilakeci) and the poem Vaisyapuranam. Nilakeci — one of the five lesser Tamil epics — was a Jain religious work about the life of the female Jain monk of the same name, who was a rival preacher of the Buddhist protagonist of Kundalakesi. The Nilakeci was written as a Jain rebuttal to the Buddhist criticism of Jainism in Kundalakesi.

Some surviving fragments imply that Kundalakesi was a Jain girl who first defeated all the Hindu scholars with her arguments, but ultimately converted to Buddhism. In contrast, the Nilakeci extensively quotes portions of the Buddhist epic, calls it a provocation, and counterclaims that Nilakeci "vanquished Kuntalakeci in argument, taught her and finally won in argument with the Buddha himself". The surviving references to the Buddhist epic give different versions of the story. Kundalakesi is a Hindu girl in some versions, in some she converts to Buddhism before she kills Kalan, and the story details of the epic vary such as in the late Tamil text Vaiciyapuranam.

The recovered verses do not reveal the plot of the epic and are advisory in nature. The introductory and 15th verses contain references to Buddhism. Yapperungalam, which also quotes the epic's Kadavul Vazhthu (lit. invocation to God) describes it as a tharkavadham — a book of controversy and polemics. Veera Sozhiyam's commentator Perunthevanar and the 14th century anthology Purathirattu both describe it as a akalakavi — a large poem.

== Story ==
Kundalakesi (lit. The woman with long curly hair) was born in a merchant family in the city of Puhar. She loses her mother during childhood and lives a sheltered life. One day she sees a robber and gambler who posted as Buddhist, falls in love with him. The thief, Kaalan, has been sentenced to death for banditry. Besotted with Kaalan, Kundalakesi implores her rich merchant father to save him. Her father petitions the king for the thief's release. He pays Kalan's release, and the king agrees to release him because Kalan's father was also a minister in his court. Kundalakesi and Kaalan are married and live happily for some time.

The love fades, and one day, the sulking Kundalakesi reminds Kalan of his criminal past. This enrages the mercurial Kaalan. He plots to murder her and steal her jewels. He tricks her into visiting the summit of the nearby hill. Once they reach the summit, he announces his intention to kill her by pushing her off the hill. Kundalakesi is shocked and asks him to grant a final wish — she wishes to worship him, her husband, by going around him three times before she dies. He agrees and, when she gets behind him, Kundalakesi pushes him off the summit, killing him.

Kundalakesi feels disgust and remorse with what she did to Kalan. She learns about different religious traditions and converts to Buddhism. She renounces, becomes a nun and achieves nirvana.

== Reception ==
The poem polemically presents Buddhist philosophy as superior over the Vedic and Jain ones. In the epic, states Krisha Murthy, the main character champions the Buddhist doctrines and ridicules doctrines of Jains and Hindus it considers as heretical. One version of the epic says that Kundalakesi was a Jain nun who moved around India, expounding Jainism and challenging anyone who had alternate views. Sariputra, a disciple of Buddha, took up the challenge and defeated Kundalakesi in debates. She renounced Jainism and became a Buddhist nun.

== In popular culture ==
The story of Kundalakesi killing her husband was used as a sub-plot in the 1951 Tamil film Manthiri Kumari.

The song "Neela Warala" by Sri Lankan musician W. D. Amaradeva mentions Kundalakesi repeatedly in the chorus.

== See also ==
- Bhadda Kundalakesa
- Neelakesi
- Buddhism and Jainism
- Tamil literature
- Five Great Epics
