= Azhagiyasingar Temple, Thiruvali =

Hindu temple in Thiruvali, Tamil Nadu

Alagiyasingar Temple
- Thiruvali Temple
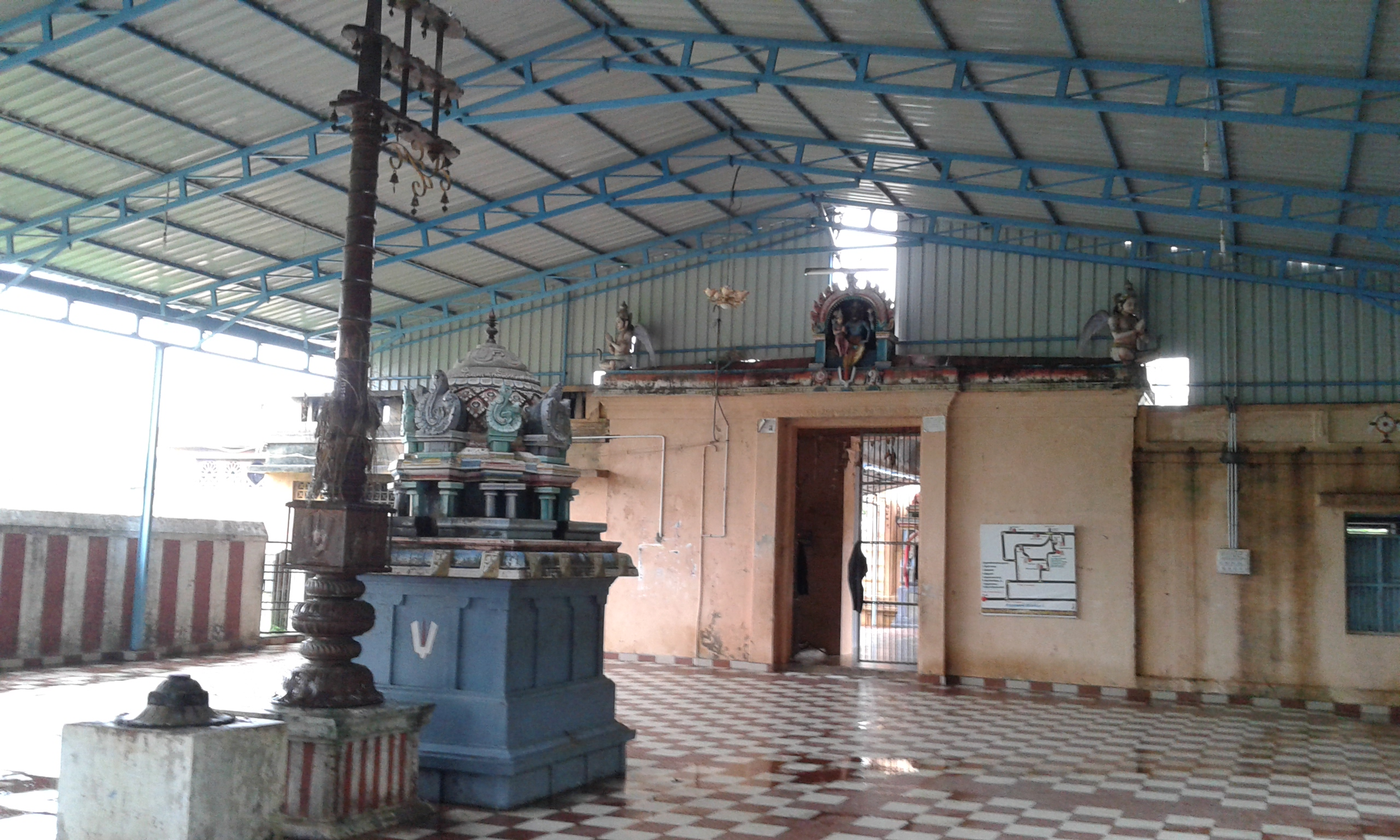

- Location in Tamil Nadu

Religion
- Affiliation: Hinduism
- District: Mayiladuthurai
- Deity: Alagiyasingar (Vishnu) Purnavalli (Lakshmi)

Location
- Location: Thiruvali
- State: Tamil Nadu
- Country: India
- Interactive map of Alagiyasingar Temple
- Coordinates: 11°12′13″N 79°46′28″E

Architecture
- Type: Dravidian architecture

The Alagiyasingar Temple in Thiruvali, a village in Mayiladuthurai district in the South Indian state of Tamil Nadu, is dedicated to the Hindu god Vishnu. Constructed in the Dravidian style of architecture, the temple is glorified in the Nalayira Divya Prabandham, the early medieval Tamil canon of the Alvar saints from the 6th–9th centuries CE. It is one of the 108 Divya Desams dedicated to Vishnu, who is worshipped as Alagiyasingar and his consort Lakshmi as Purnavalli.

A granite wall surrounds the temple, enclosing all its shrines. The temple is originally believed to have been built by the Cholas, with later additions by the Vijayanagara and Thanjavur Nayak kings during the 16th century.

Alagiyasingar is believed to have appeared to Thirumangai Alvar at this place. The legend of the temple is closely associated with Thirunagari temple. The temple follows Thenkalai tradition of worship. Four daily rituals and three yearly festivals are held at the temple, of which the Thirumangai Alvar Utsavam during Thai being the most prominent. The temple is maintained and administered by the Hindu Religious and Endowment Board of the Government of Tamil Nadu.

== Legend ==
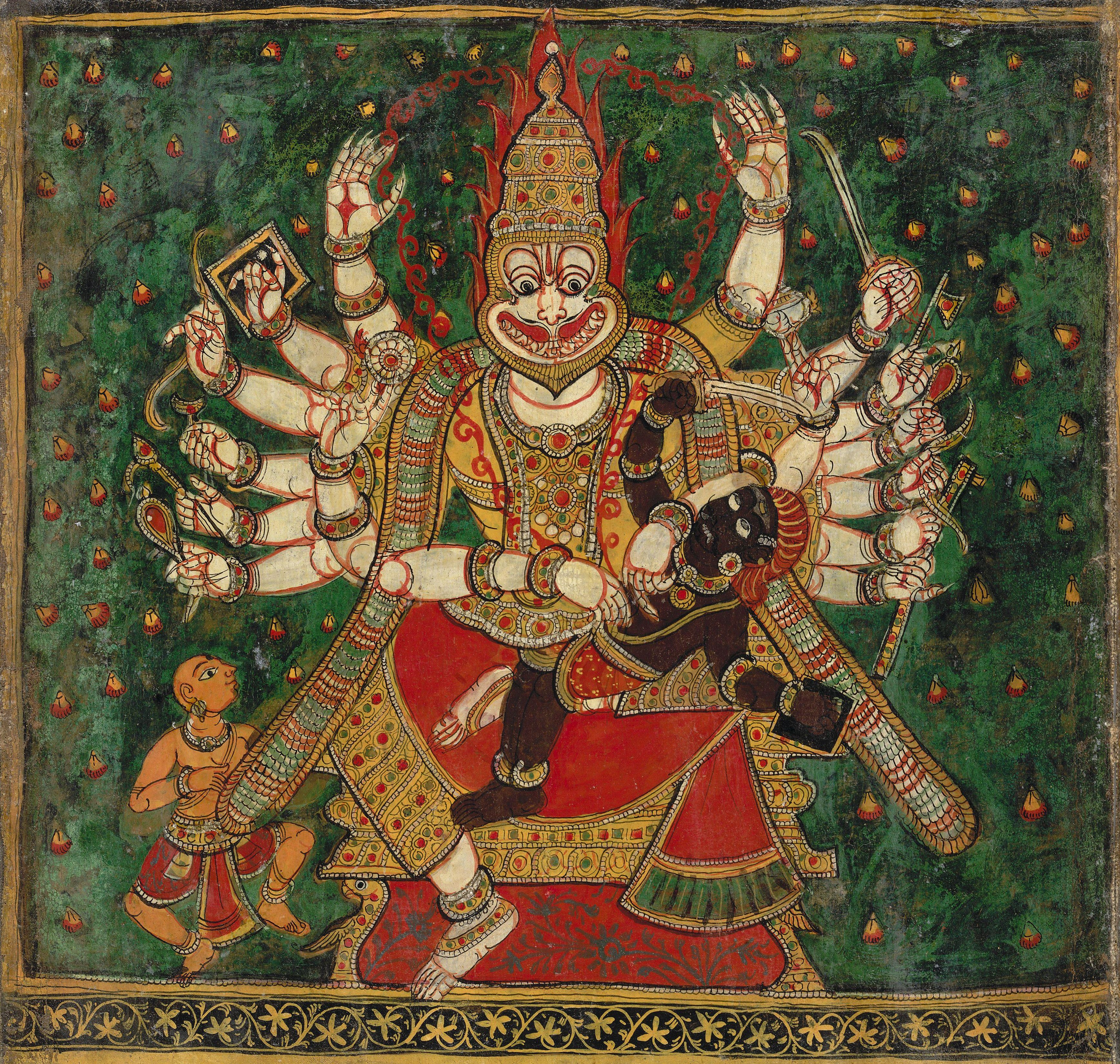
Image of Narasimha slaying Hiranyakasipu, Prahlada is also seen praying

As per Hindu legend, a son of Brahma named Karthama Prajapathi did penance worshipping Vishnu to attain moksha. Vishnu was not pleased and Lakshmi, his consort, wanted to give moksha to him immediately. During Kali Yuga, Karthama was born as prince named Sangabalan. During his young age, he wanted to marry Kumudavalli, who was an ardent devotee of Vishnu. She stipulated that she would marry him only if he feeds thousand devotees of Vishnu. Sangabalan started feeding the devotees and at one point, when he was short of money, resorted to burglary. Vishnu came with Lakshmi incognito and Sangabalan tried to rob them as well. Vishnu uttered the Ashtatra Mantra in his ears and he turned into Thirumangai Alvar. It is believed that Thirumangai Alvar worshipped five Narasimhars including this one. The temple is also called Lakshmi Narasimha Kshetram and Vayalali Manavalan temple. Another variant states that the Vishnu directed his wife Lakshmi to be born as the daughter of sage Purna so that he can grace both her and Thirumangai Alvar together.

As per another legend, Vishnu took the avatar of Narasimha to slay the demon king Hiryankasipu. Hiranyakasipu was troubling the Devas as he got a boon from Brahma that no human can kill him. His son Prahlada was an ardent devotee of Vishnu, against the likes of his father. Hiranyakasipu tried to slay Prahlada by various means, but was saved by the divine grace of Vishnu. Vishnu took the avatar of Narasimha and appeared from a pillar. Narasimha was a human with lion face and slayed Hiranyakasipu on an evening time in a doorway, which was neither land nor air. His anger was not quenched even after slaying the demon king and Lakshmi came and sat on his lap, after which he calmed down. It is believed that since Narasimha did an aalinganam (meaning hug), the place came to be known as Thiruvali. The uniqueness of this temple is that Lakshmi is seen sitting in right side of Narasimmar which is very rare to have darshan as in most temples Lakshmi is seen in left side of swamy Narasimmar. Ahishekam in swathy star day gives very good blessings of the divine couple.

== History and literary mention ==
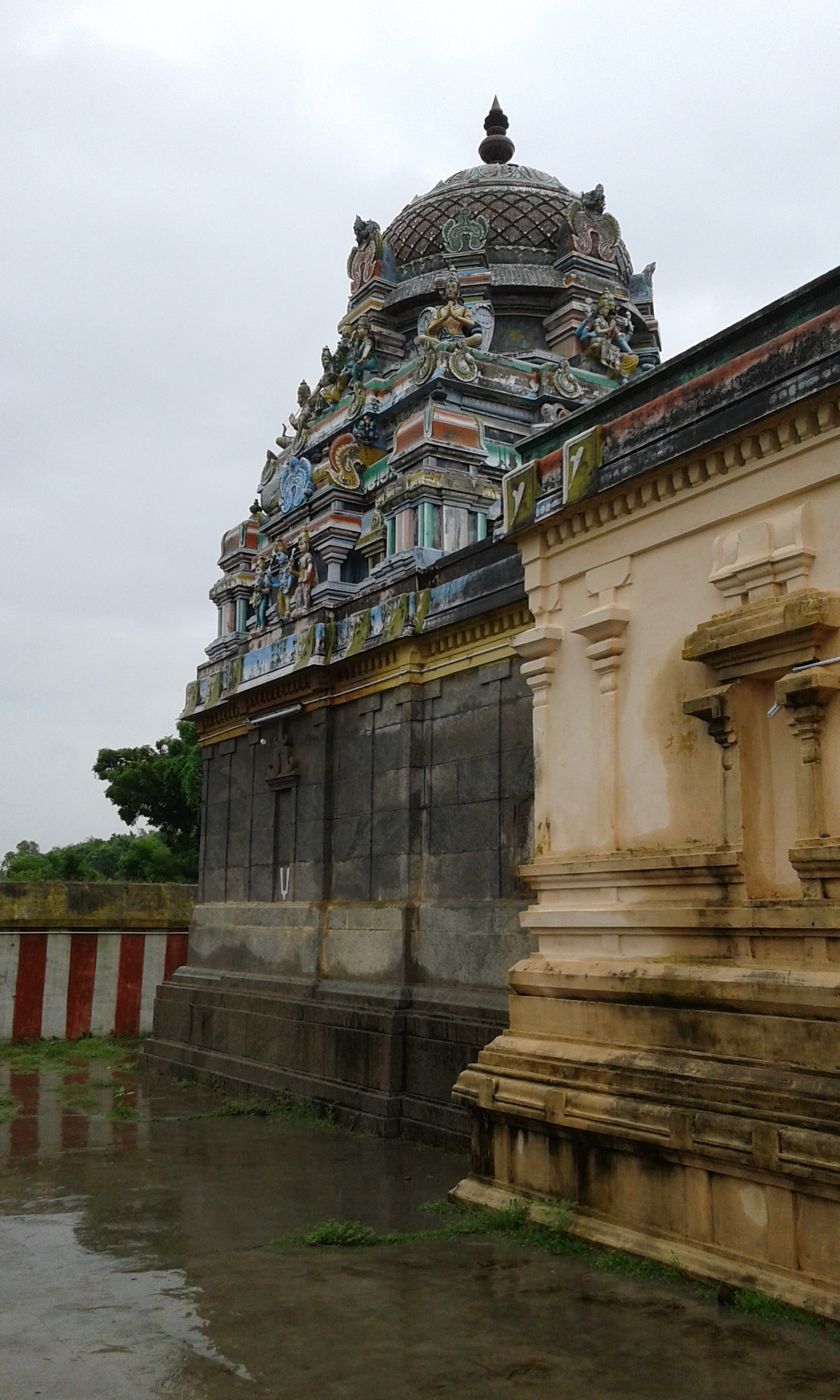
Shrine of Alagiyasingar

The exact history of the temple could not be ascertained. It is believed to have been built by the Cholas, with later additions by the Vijayanagar and Thanjavur Nayak kings. Alagiyasingar temple is revered in Nalayira Divya Prabhandam, the 7th–9th century Vaishnava canon, by Kulasekara Alvar and Thirumangai Alvar. The temple is classified as a Divya Desam, one of the 108 Vishnu temples that are mentioned in the book. The songs of the Alvars refer both this temple and the Thirunagari temple and hence both are counted as one Divya Desam. During the 18th and 19th centuries, the temple is mentioned in 108 Tirupathi Anthathi by Divya Kavi Pillai Perumal Aiyangar. The temple is maintained and administered by the Hindu Religious and Endowment Board of the Government of Tamil Nadu. The temple is the capital of Thirumangai Alvar, who was the ruler of a kingdom and also the birthplace of Kumudavalli, the wife of Alvar.

== Architecture ==
Alagiyasingar temple covers an area of about 0.5 acres (0.20 hectares). The temple in enclosed in a rectangular enclosure with surrounded by granite walls. The central houses the image of the presiding deity, Alagiyasingar. The image is made of granite is sported in sitting posture, with Lakshmi seated on his lap on the right side. This posture is unique as usually the image of Lakshmi on Narasimhar temples are sculpted on the left side. The festival deity is named Thiruvali Nagaralan and the image is also housed in the sanctum. A south facing shrine of Thirumangai Alvar is located outside the temple walls, opposite to the Garuda Mandapam. It is believed that the image of Narasimhar in the temple are among the five original images of Narasimha worshipped by Thirumangai Alvar. The temple mast, the shrine of Garuda and a four pillared hall are located axial to the sanctum, outside the compound wall.

== Religious practices and festival ==
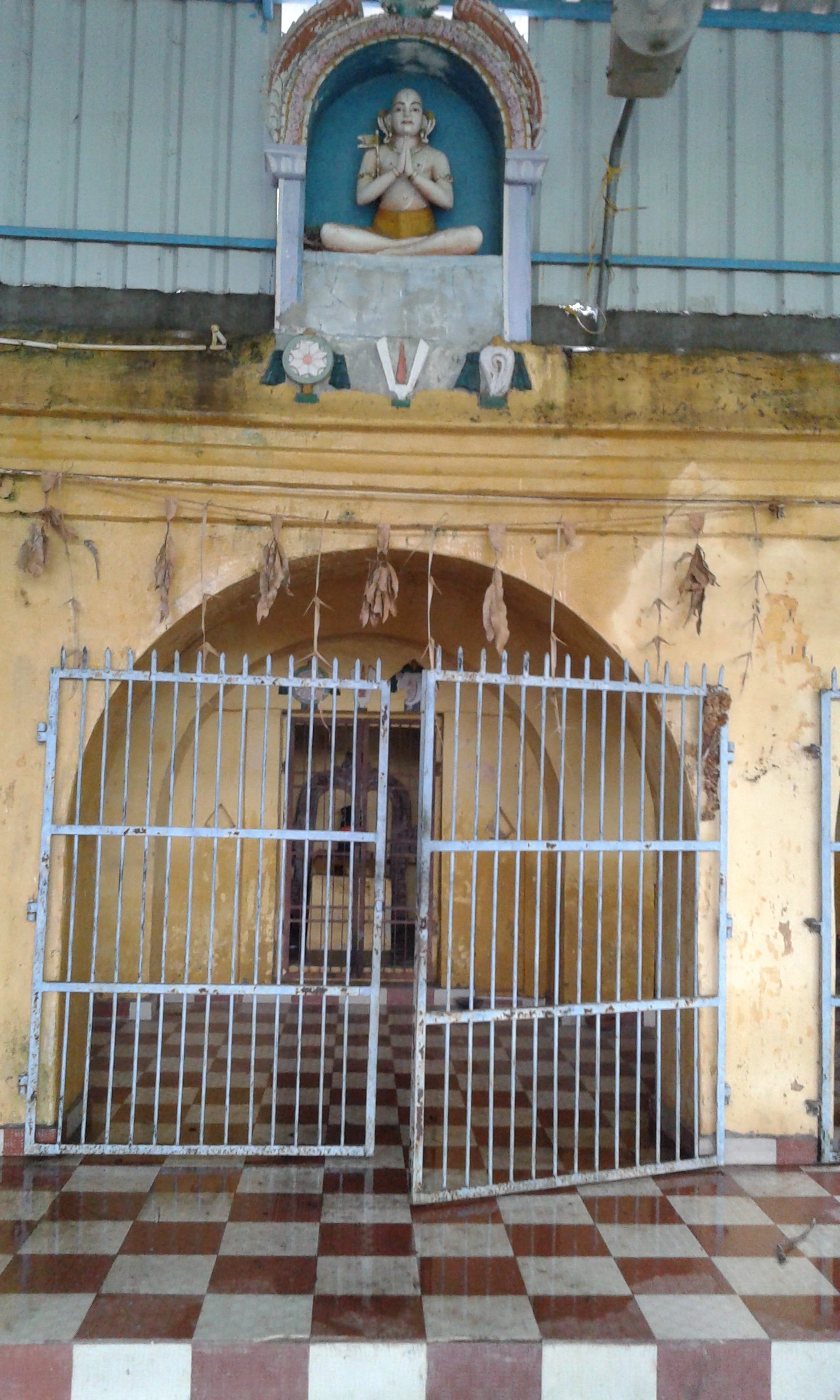
Shrine of Thirumangai Azhwar

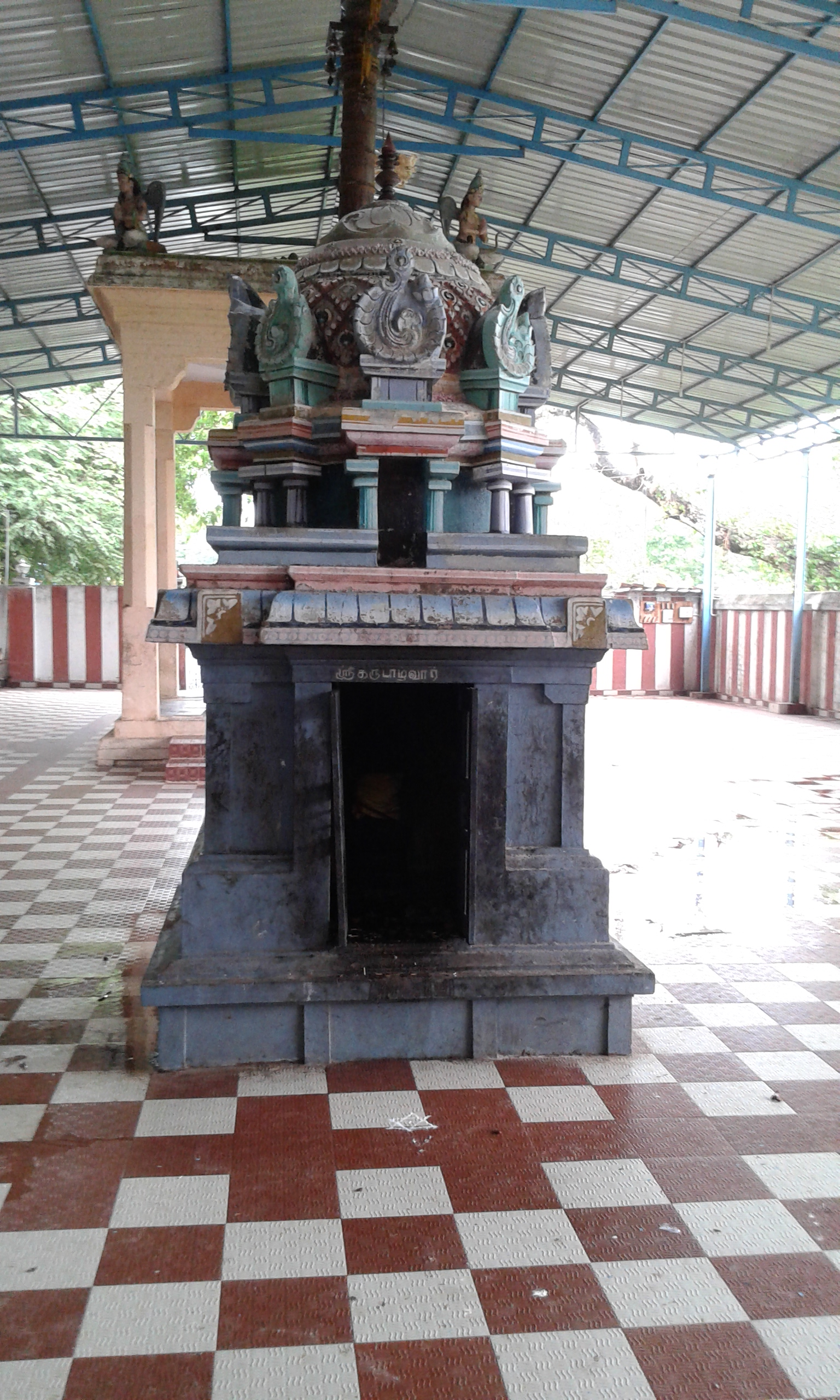
Shrine of Garuda

The temple follows the traditions of the Thenkalai sect and follows Vaikasana aagama. The temple is open from 7:30-11:30 am and between 4-7:30 pm. The temple priests perform the pooja (rituals) during festivals and on a daily basis. The temple rituals are performed four times a day: Kalasanthi at 8:00 a.m., Uchikalam at 12:00 p.m., Sayarakshai at 5:00 p.m., and Sayatrakshai at 7:30 p.m. There are weekly, monthly and fortnightly rituals performed in the temple.

The Thirumangai Alvar Mangalasasana Utsavam is the most prominent festival of the temple. During the new moon day of the Tamil month Thai (January - February), the festival deity of presiding deity is taken in a Garuda mount to Thirumanimadam from Thiruvali. The major event of the festival is Garudasevai in which the festival images of the eleven Thirunangur Tirupathis are brought on mount designed like Garuda, called Garuda Vahana, to Thirunangur. The festive image of Thirumangai Alvar is brought on a Hamsa Vahanam (palanquin) from Thirunagari and his paasurams (verses) dedicated to each of these eleven temples are recited during the occasion. The festival images of Thirumangai Alvar and his consort Kumudavalli Naachiyar are taken in the palanquin to each of the eleven temples and the verses dedicated to the temples are chanted in the respective shrines. The other festivals celebrated in the temple are the ten-day Vaikasi Swathi festival, Pavitrotsavam during Aani (June - July), Swathi every month, and Panguni Uthiram during Panguni (March - April).
