= Tirukkuruntantakam =

Tamil Hindu work of literature

- ← Periya Tirumoli Tirunetuntantakam →
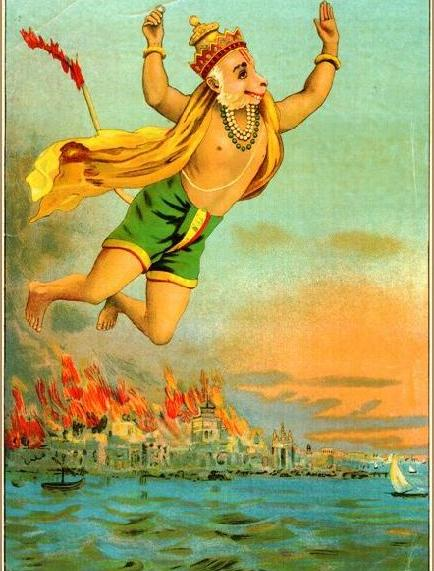
- Hanuman sets Lanka aflame, Raja Ravi Varma.

Information
- Religion: Hinduism
- Author: Tirumangai Alvar
- Language: Tamil
- Period: 9th–10th century CE
- Verses: 20

The Tirukkuruntantakam (Tamil: திருக்குறுந்தாண்டகம், romanized: Tirukkuruntāṇṭakam, lit. 'The short and sacred verse') is a Tamil Hindu work of literature penned by Tirumangai Alvar, one of the twelve poet-saints of Sri Vaishnavism. The work is a part of a compendium of hymns called the Nalayira Divya Prabandham. The Tirukkuruntantakam consists of 20 hymns and is dedicated to the deity Vishnu. It is written in a Tamil poetic meter known as the tāṇṭakam, in which each line of a stanza consists of more than 26 syllables, comprising quatrains of equal length.

== Hymns ==
In the Tirukkuruntantakam, the poet-saint includes his mangalasasanam (auspicious felicitations) to Vishnu at a number of Divya Desams, the sacred temples of the deity. In a number of hymns, he laments the time that he had spent in the pursuit of transient pleasures rather than in religious devotion. He also regards dwelling on Vishnu and his kalyana gunas (auspicious attributes) to be his food and drink.

Tirumangai Alvar discusses the dependency of own's soul on God to achieve moksha, which he regards ends earthly suffering.

The fifth hymn of this work compares the sweetness of the author's deity to the consumption of sugarcane juice:

Like a hot iron drinking up water my love swelled. I directed it to the lord, made myself his devotee, and found my refuge. Bearing the cloud-hued lord in my heart, I drink him like sugarcane juice. Ah, how sweet he is!

— Tirukkuruntantakam, Hymn 5

A hymn compares the deeds of Hanuman in the Ramayana for Rama with his own dedication to his deity:

In the yore, Hanuman went to the wealthy city of walled Lanka and burnt it to ashes, then returned to serve the lord Rama’s feet. I, this devotee-self, shall melt myself to the bones and bathe and anoint the lord with the water of knowledge flowing from my love-laden heart!

— Tirukkuruntantakam, Hymn 15

== See also ==
Topics in Tamil literature
Sangam Literature
Five Great Epics
Silappatikaram	Manimekalai
Civaka Cintamani	Valayapathi
Kundalakesi
Five Minor Epics
Neelakesi	Culamani
Naga Kumara Kaviyam	Udayana Kumara Kaviyam
Yashodhara Kaviyam
Bhakti Literature
Naalayira Divya Prabandham	Kamba Ramayanam
Tevaram	Tirumurai
Tamil people
Sangam	Sangam landscape
Tamil history from Sangam literature	Ancient Tamil music

- Tirunetuntantakam
- Tiruvelukkutrirukkai
- Periya Tirumoli
