= Thiruvali-Thirunagari =

Pair of Hindu temples in Tamil nadu

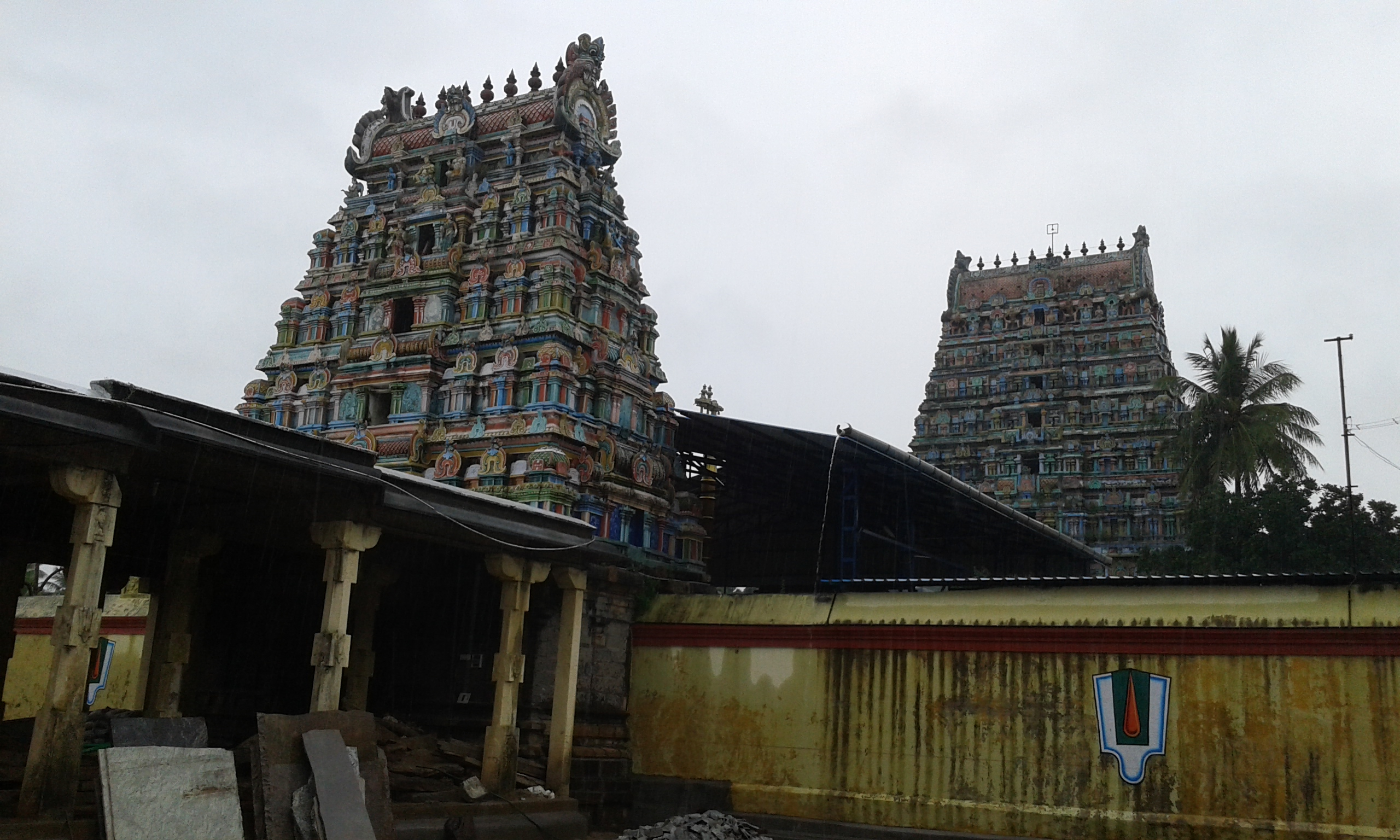
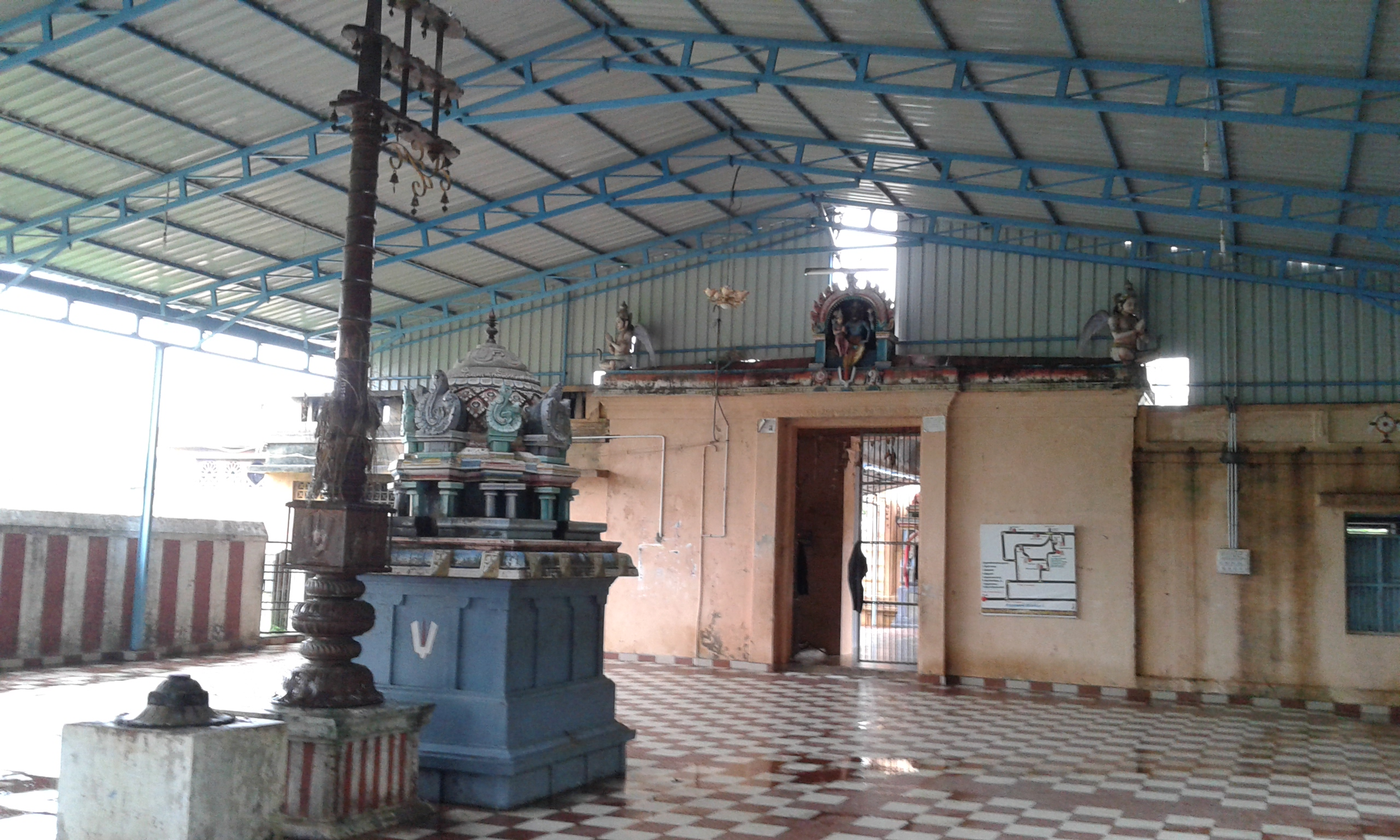
- Thirunagari and Thiruvali temples

- Location in Tamil Nadu

Religion
- Affiliation: Hinduism
- District: Mayiladuthurai
- Deity: Lakshmi Narasimhan, Vedarajan (Vishnu); Amirtagatavalli, Amirtavalli (Lakshmi)

Location
- Location: Thirvali, Thirunagari
- State: Tamil Nadu
- Country: India
- Coordinates: 11°13′32″N 79°47′58″E

Architecture
- Type: Dravidian architecture
- Temple: 2

The Thiruvali - Thirunagari Temples are paired Hindu temples dedicated to Vishnu located 10 kilometres (6.2 mi) from Sirkali in Tamil Nadu, India, and 5 kilometres (3.1 mi) from each other. It is one of the Divya Desams, the 108 temples of Vishnu revered by the 12 poet saints, or Alvars. Unlike other Divya Desams where a single shrine is referred, this pair of temples is referred to together in all of the 41 pasurams (hymns). These temples follow the Tenkalai mode of worship.

Granite walls surround the temple, enclosing all its shrines, while the water tank is located in a street axial to the eastern gateway. The temple has a seven-tiered rajagopuram, the gateway tower. The temples are originally believed to have been built by the Cholas, with later additions by the Vijayanagara and Thanjavur Nayak kings who commissioned pillared halls and major shrines of the temples during the 16th century.

Vedarajan and Aḻagiyasingar are believed to have appeared to Thirumangai Alvar at this place. The temples follow the Tenkalai tradition of worship. Four daily rituals and three yearly festivals are held at the temple, of which the fourteen-day annual Brahmotsavam during the Tamil month of Vaikasi (May - June) being the most prominent. The temple is maintained and administered by the Hindu Religious and Endowment Board of the Government of Tamil Nadu.

== Legend ==
The legends of all the eleven temples of Tirunangur are closely associated with each other. According to legend, the Hindu god Shiva started dancing in fury at this place after the death of his consort Sati during the yajna (sacrifice) of Daksha. Each time his lock of hair touched the ground, there were eleven other forms of Shiva who appeared. The celestial deities were worried that if the dance continues, it would result in decimation of entire creations. They prayed to Vishnu for help, who appeared at this place. On seeing Vishnu, Shiva's anger was reduced and he requested Vishnu to appear in eleven forms like he did. On his request, Vishnu appeared in eleven different forms at Tirunangur. The eleven places where Vishnu appeared are believed to be where the eleven temples in Tirunangur are located. It is believed that the celestial deities had an assembly here at the temple. It is also believed that sage Vasishtha is believed to have worshiped Vishnu at this temple. In another variant, Shiva requested Vishnu to appear in eleven different forms like him to control the eleven Shiva forms he created.

== Architecture ==
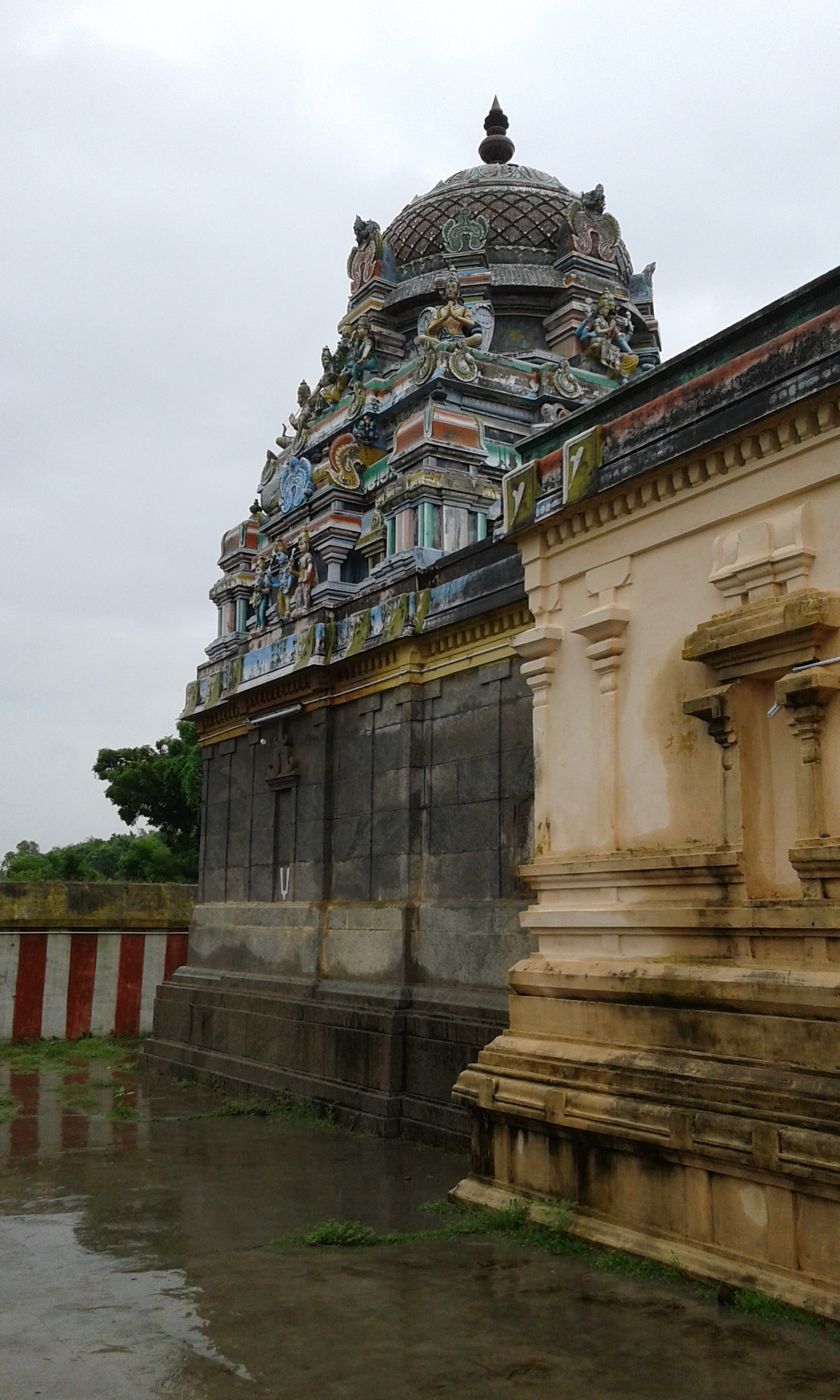
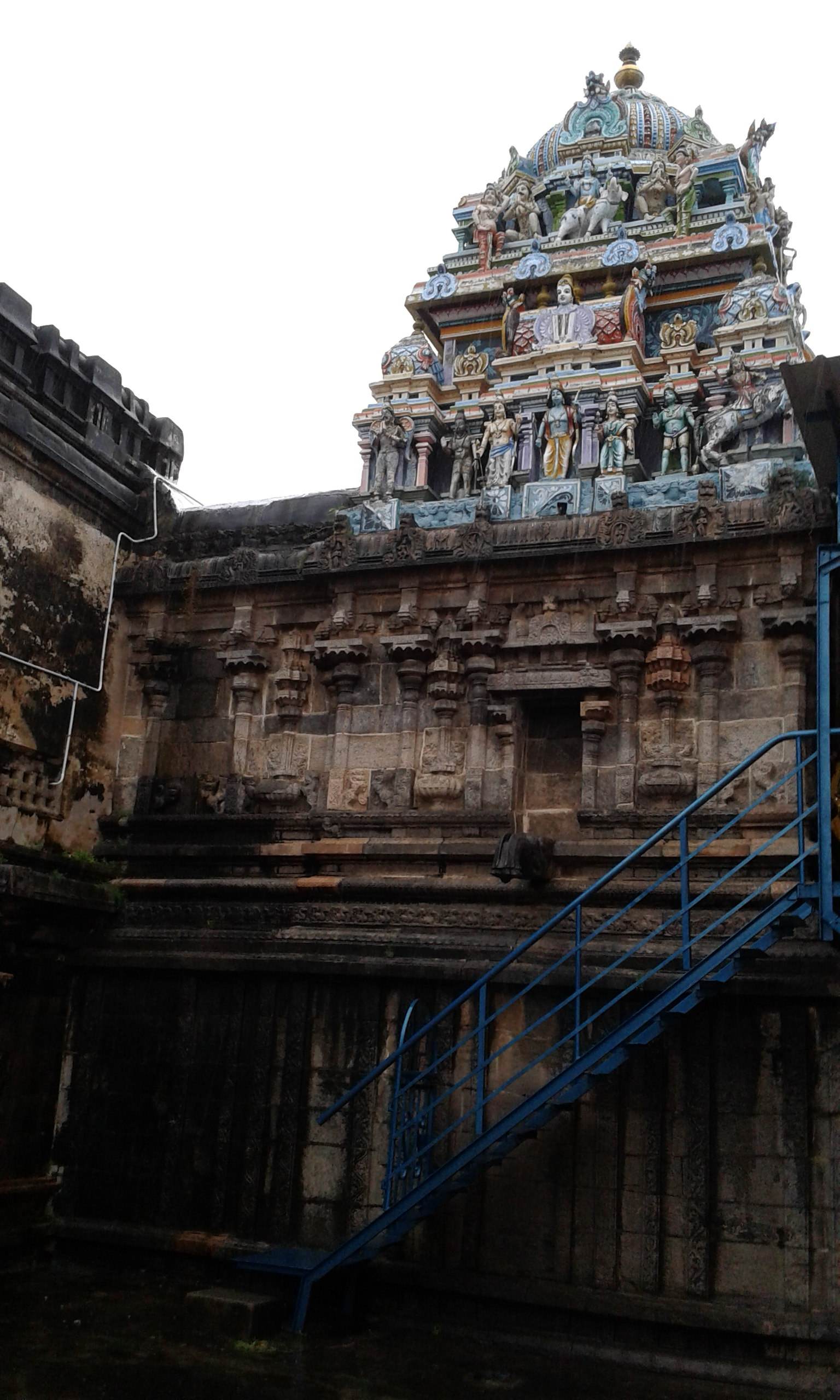
Shrines of Thiruvali and Thirunagari

The Aḻagiyasingar Temple at Thiruvali has small west facing shrine. The village is where the consort Sri Kumudavalli naachiyar of Thirumangai Alvar were raised. Aḻagiyasingar temple covers an area of about 0.5 acres (0.20 hectares). The temple in enclosed in a rectangular enclosure with surrounded by granite walls. The central houses the image of the presiding deity, Aḻagiyasingar. The image is made of granite is sported in sitting posture, with Lakshmi seated on his lap on the right side. This posture is unique as usually the image of Lakshmi on Narasimhar temples are sculpted on the left side. The festival deity is named Thiruvali Nagaralan and the image is also housed in the sanctum. A south facing shrine of Thirumangai Alvar is located outside the temple walls, opposite to the Garuda Mandapam. It is believed that the image of Narasimhar in the temple are among the five original images of Narasimha worshipped by Thirumangai Alvar. The temple mast, the shrine of Garuda and a four pillared hall are located axial to the sanctum, outside the compound wall.

Thirunagari is the birthplace of Thirumangai Alvar. The Vedarajan temple has a 7-tier rajagopuram and an elevated structure. Unlike other temples where the temple tree (kodimaram) faces the main deity, the flagstaff here faces the shrine of Thirumangai Alvar. Vedarajan temple covers an area of about 2 acres (0.81 hectares) and has a seven-tiered gopuram (gateway tower) raising to a height of 125 ft (38 m). The temple in enclosed in a rectangular enclosure with huge granite walls. The sanctum is approached through a second gateway tower. There are a series of pillared structure around the basement of the first enclosure. The central shrine has an elevated structure and houses the image of the presiding deity, Vedarajan. The image is made of granite is sported in sitting posture. The festival deity is named Kalyana Ranganathar and the image is also housed in the sanctum. The vimana, the shrine over the sanctum is Ashtanga in architecture, which has eight parts. The outer parts of the vimana have stucco images of sages, the Dashavatara, Lakshmi Narasimha, Lakshmi Narayana and the other avatars of Vishnu. A north facing shrine of Thirumangai Alvar is located in the same elevated enclosure. There is a separate flag staff for the Alvar shrine. It is believed that the two images of Narasimhar in the temple are among the five original images of Narasimha worshipped by Thirumangai Alvar. There is a small image of Chindanaikiniyan, which is also believed to have been worshipped by the Alvar. The shrine of Amruthavalli is located in the basement, in the diagonal corner of the first enclosure.

== History and literary mention ==
The exact history of the temples could not be ascertained. They are believed to have been built by the Cholas, with later additions by the Vijayanagara and Thanjavur Nayak kings. Both the temples are revered together in Nalayira Divya Prabhandam, the 7th–9th century Vaishnava canon, by Kulasekara Alvar and Thirumangai Alvar. The temple is classified as a Divya Desam, one of the 108 Vishnu temples that are mentioned in the book. The songs of the Alvars refer both this temple and the Thirunagari temple and hence both are counted as one Divya Desam. During the 18th and 19th centuries, the temples were mentioned in 108 Tirupathi Anthathi by Divya Kavi Pillai Perumal Aiyangar. The temples are maintained and administered by the Hindu Religious and Endowment Board of the Government of Tamil Nadu. The Aḻagiyasingar temple was the capital of Thirumangai Alvar, who was the ruler of a kingdom and also the birthplace of Kumudavalli, the wife of Alvar.

== Worship practices and festivals ==
The temples are open from 8 am to 10 am and 5 pm to 7 pm. The temple priests perform the pooja (rituals) during festivals and on a daily basis. As at other Vishnu temples of Tamil Nadu, the priests belong to the Vaishnava community, from the Brahmin class. The temple rituals are performed four times a day: Kalahanthi at 8 a.m., Ukshikalam at 10:00 a.m., Sayarakshai at 5:00 p.m. and Ardha Jamam at 7:00 p.m. Each ritual has three steps: alangaram (decoration), neivethanam (food offering) and deepa aradanai (waving of lamps) for the deities. During the worship, religious instructions in the Vedas (sacred text) are recited by priests, and worshippers prostrate themselves in front of the temple mast. There are weekly, monthly and fortnightly rituals performed in the temple.

During the new moon day of the Tamil month Tai, the festival deity of Thirumangai Alvar is brought to the Pushotama Perumal temple from Thiruvali-Thirunagari. The Thirumangai Alvar Mangalasasana Utsavam is celebrated in the Tamil month of Tai (January–February). The highlight of the festival is Garudasevai, an event in which the festival images of the eleven Tirunangur Tirupathis are brought on mount designed like Garuda, called Garuda Vahana, to Tirunangur. The festive image of Thirumangai Alvar is also brought on a Hamsa Vahanam (palanquin) and his pasurams (hymns) dedicated to each of these eleven temples are recited during the occasion. The festival images of Thirumangai Alvar and his consort Kumudavalli Naachiyar are taken in a palanquin to each of the eleven temples. The verses dedicated to each of the eleven temples are chanted in the respective shrines. This is one of the most important festivals in the region which draws thousands of visitors.

== Sources ==
- R., Dr. Vijayalakshmy (2001). An introduction to religion and Philosophy - Tévarám and Tivviyappirapantam (1st ed.). Chennai: International Institute of Tamil Studies.
