= Periya Tirumatal =

Tamil Hindu work of literature

- ← Ciriya Tirumatal Tiruvaymoli →
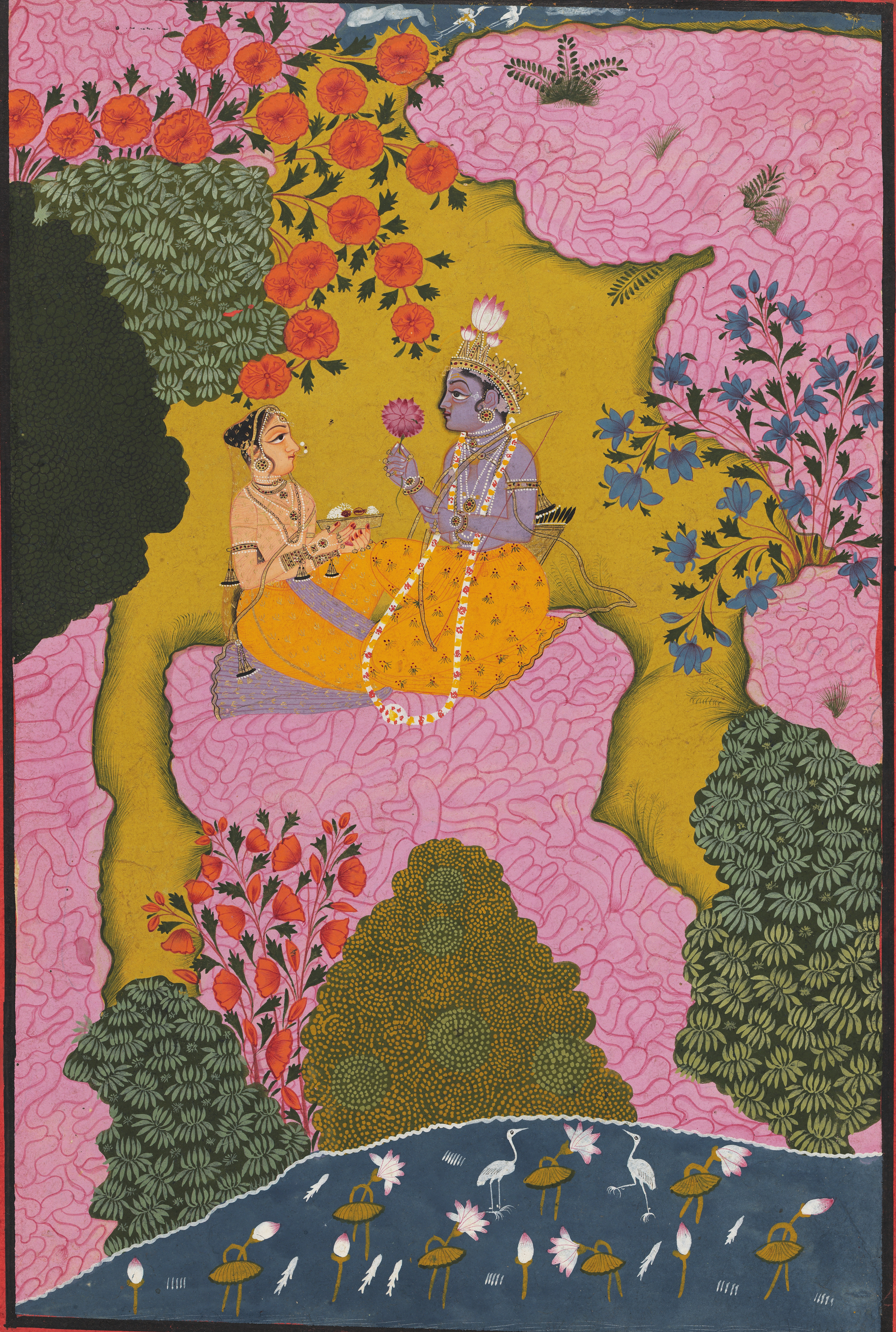
- 18th century painting of Rama and Sita in exile. National Museum, New Delhi.

Information
- Religion: Hinduism
- Author: Tirumangai Alvar
- Language: Tamil
- Period: 9th–10th century CE
- Verses: 78

The Periya Tirumatal (Tamil: பெரிய திருமடல், romanized: Periya Tirumaṭal, lit. 'The big and sacred maṭal') is a Tamil Hindu work of literature written by Tirumangai Alvar, one of the twelve Alvars of Sri Vaishnavism. The work is a part of the compendium of hymns called the Nalayira Divya Prabandham. The Periya Tirumatal consists of 78 hymns, referred to as pasurams.

== Hymns ==
=== Theme ===
Along with its companion poem called the Ciriya Tirumatal, the Periya Tirumatal employs a poetic device from Sangam literature called the maṭal. This referred to an ancient Tamil custom through which a lovesick man attempted to win the heart of his beloved by refusing food and drink, bathing, sleep, and other daily activities, and wandering the streets while singing about the woman he loved. As a last resort, the man expressed his willingness to take his own life in the presence of his beloved. The custom was romanticised, and hence traditionally ended with the woman being moved by the devotion of the man, and agreeing to marry him. In this work, Tirumangai Alvar assumes the role of a gopika, a milk-maid lover of Krishna, and performs a maṭal to win the deity's heart. By doing so, he breaks the convention of women not being allowed to perform the custom, citing his adherence to the northern Sanskrit school of Sri Vaishnavism as opposed to the southern Tamil school.

A stanza of the Periya Tirumatal describes the legend of Rama, and his exile with his wife, Sita:

The warrior king by his father's command gave up his kingdom steadfastly,
the good cityfolk followed his weeping,
and left his own country as well and crossed the glaring desert with shrunken bellies,
past the dry rocky mountains with hot gale winds that would split bamboos,
and entered the terrible forest of death-blow rakshasas,
walking over splinter rocks in the scorching sun with petal-soft feet.
Behind the king Rama, did not the swan-gaited goddess called Vaidehi walk too?

— Periya Tirumatal

== See also ==
Topics in Tamil literature
Sangam Literature
Five Great Epics
Silappatikaram	Manimekalai
Civaka Cintamani	Valayapathi
Kundalakesi
Five Minor Epics
Neelakesi	Culamani
Naga Kumara Kaviyam	Udayana Kumara Kaviyam
Yashodhara Kaviyam
Bhakti Literature
Naalayira Divya Prabandham	Kamba Ramayanam
Tevaram	Tirumurai
Tamil people
Sangam	Sangam landscape
Tamil history from Sangam literature	Ancient Tamil music

- Tiruvelukkutrirukkai
- Ciriya Tirumatal
- Tiruvaciriyam
