= Tirunetuntantakam =

Tamil Hindu work of literature

- ← Tirukkuruntantakam Mutal Tiruvantati →
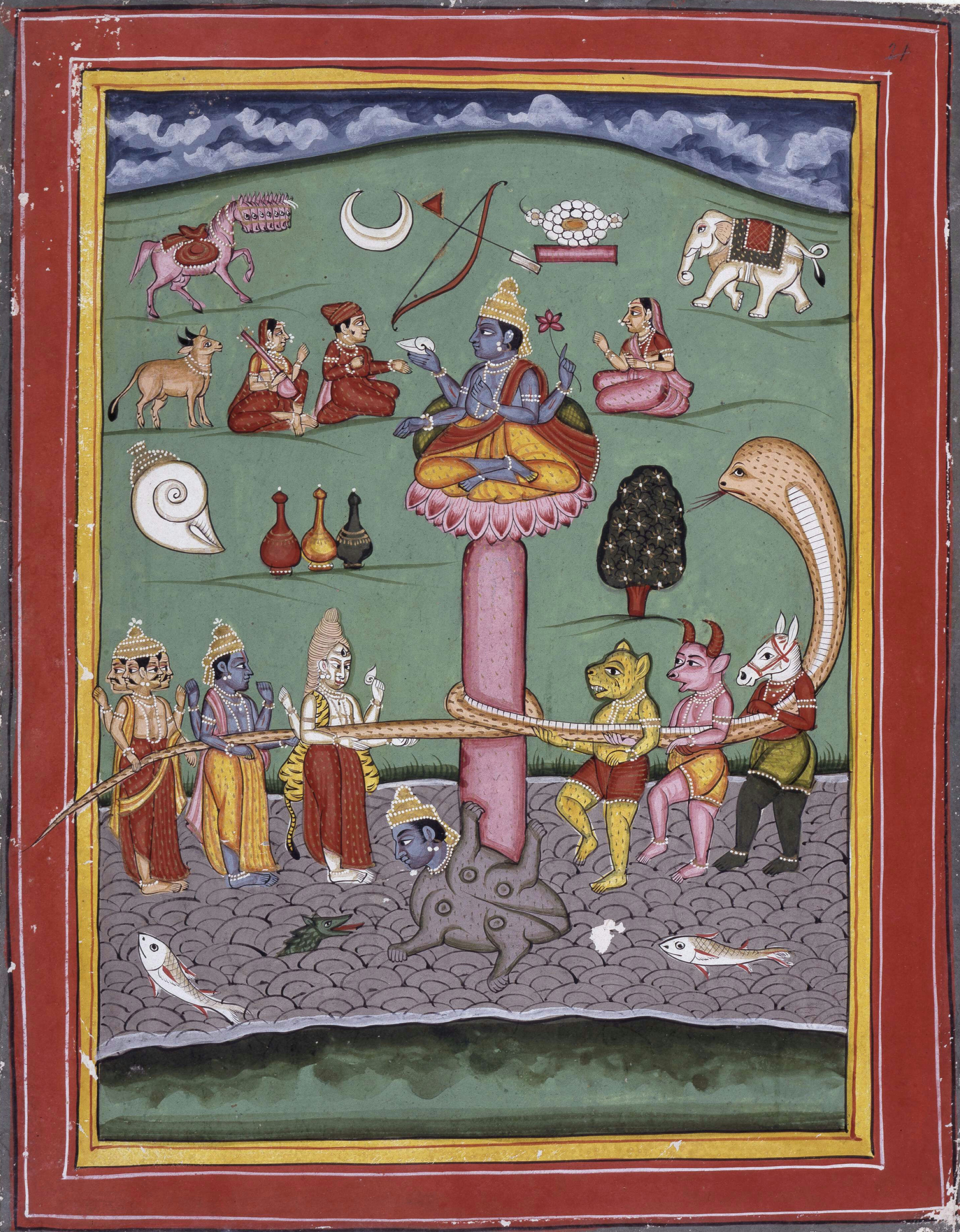
- Painting of the Samudra Manthana, the British Museum.

Information
- Religion: Hinduism
- Author: Tirumangai Alvar
- Language: Tamil
- Period: 9th–10th century CE
- Verses: 30

The Tirunetuntantakam (Tamil: திருநெடுந்தாண்டகம், romanized: Tirunetuntāṇṭakam, lit. 'The sacred and long verse') is a Tamil Hindu work of literature authored by Tirumangai Alvar, one of the twelve poet-saints of Sri Vaishnavism. The work is a part of a compendium of hymns called the Nalayira Divya Prabandham. The Tirunetuntantakam consists of 30 hymns dedicated to the deity Vishnu. It is written in a Tamil poetic meter known as the tāṇṭakam, in which each line of a stanza consists of more than 26 syllables, composed of quatrains of equal length.

== Hymns ==
Tirumangai Alvar takes the role of a nayaki (a female consort) who pines for the nayaka (God) in the hymns of this work.

In hymns 13 and 14, the poet-saint teaches a parrot to hail the epithets of Vishnu, and honours the bird by offering her folded palms in veneration.

The third hymn of the Tirunetuntantakam describes the Kurma incarnation of Vishnu during the Samudra Manthana:

The dark blue-hued lord is a picture of auspiciousness. In each age he takes a different form, suited to that age. In the Tretayuga he took the huge form of a tortoise to churn ambrosia from the ocean. Other than praising him as the fair lord of dark hue and lotus eyes, can any one describe him in totality?

— Tirunetuntantakam, Hymn 3

The fourth hymn proclaims Vishnu's supremacy over other deities, celestial objects, and the five elements:

The lord who is master of Indra and Brahma appears as the five elements earth, water, fire, air and space, the poetry of Tamil and the Sanskrit Vedas. He is the four Quarters, Moon and Sun, the gods in the sky, the invisible Veda-purusha, the secret of the Upanishads. O Heart! If you can remember him through the Mantra, we can live in eternity.

— Tirunetuntantakam, Hymn 4

== Philosophy ==
The hymns of the Tirunetuntantakam have been interpreted to describe the three key principles of the Vishishtadvaita philosophy: tattva (knowledge of the entities of jiva, ajiva, and ishvara), hita (achieving realisation through bhakti and prapatti), and purushartha (the goal of moksha). It also references the five Agamic forms of Vishnu that are featured in the Pancharatra Agama: Para, the form of Vishnu in Vaikuntha, the four Vyuhas and the Upavyuhas, Vibhava, Antaryami, the form of the deity who pervades all of existence, and Archa, the form of the deity venerated as murtis.

== See also ==
Topics in Tamil literature
Sangam Literature
Five Great Epics
Silappatikaram	Manimekalai
Civaka Cintamani	Valayapathi
Kundalakesi
Five Minor Epics
Neelakesi	Culamani
Naga Kumara Kaviyam	Udayana Kumara Kaviyam
Yashodhara Kaviyam
Bhakti Literature
Naalayira Divya Prabandham	Kamba Ramayanam
Tevaram	Tirumurai
Tamil people
Sangam	Sangam landscape
Tamil history from Sangam literature	Ancient Tamil music

- Tiruvelukkutrirukkai
- Tirukkuruntantakam
- Periya Tirumoli
