= Periya Tirumoli =

Tamil Hindu work of literature

- ← Kanninun Cirutampu Tirukkuruntantakam →
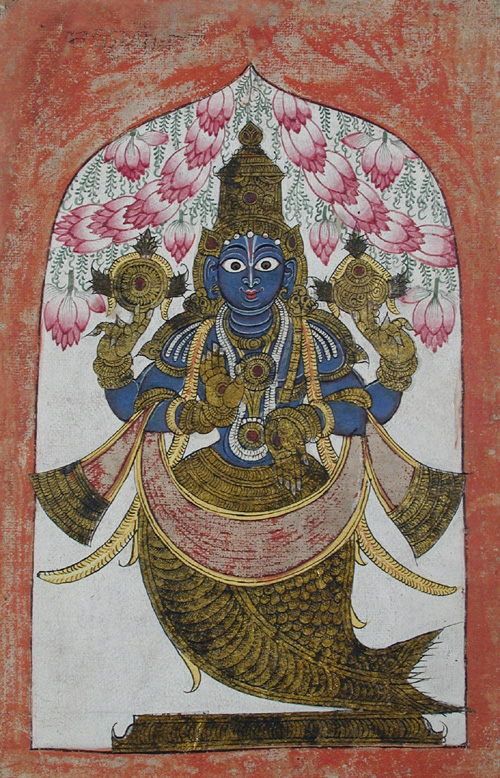
- The Matsya avatar of Vishnu, extolled in this work.

Information
- Religion: Hinduism
- Author: Tirumangai Alvar
- Language: Tamil
- Period: 9th–10th century CE
- Verses: 1,084

The Periya Tirumoli (Tamil: பெரிய திருமொழி, romanized: Periya Tirumoḻi, lit. 'Grand sacred verses') is a work of Tamil Hindu literature, consisting of 1,084 hymns. It was written by the poet-saint Tirumangai Alvar. It forms a part of the compilation of the hymns of the Alvars, called the Nalayira Divya Prabandham.

== Content ==
According to Sri Vaishnava tradition, Tirumangai Alvar converted to Vaishnavism due to the influence of his wife, Kumudavalli. He resorted to robbing the rich in order to feed and assist all those who shared his faith. Once, he attempted to rob a wedding party, not knowing that the bride and groom were Andal and Ranganatha. Unable to remove the beautiful toe-ring from the feet of the groom, he placed his head down, intending to bite it off the feet. He immediately realised that the feet were divine, and belonged to Vishnu himself. He gave up robbery, and composed the Periya Tirumoli to extol the deity after the latter taught him the Narayana mantra.

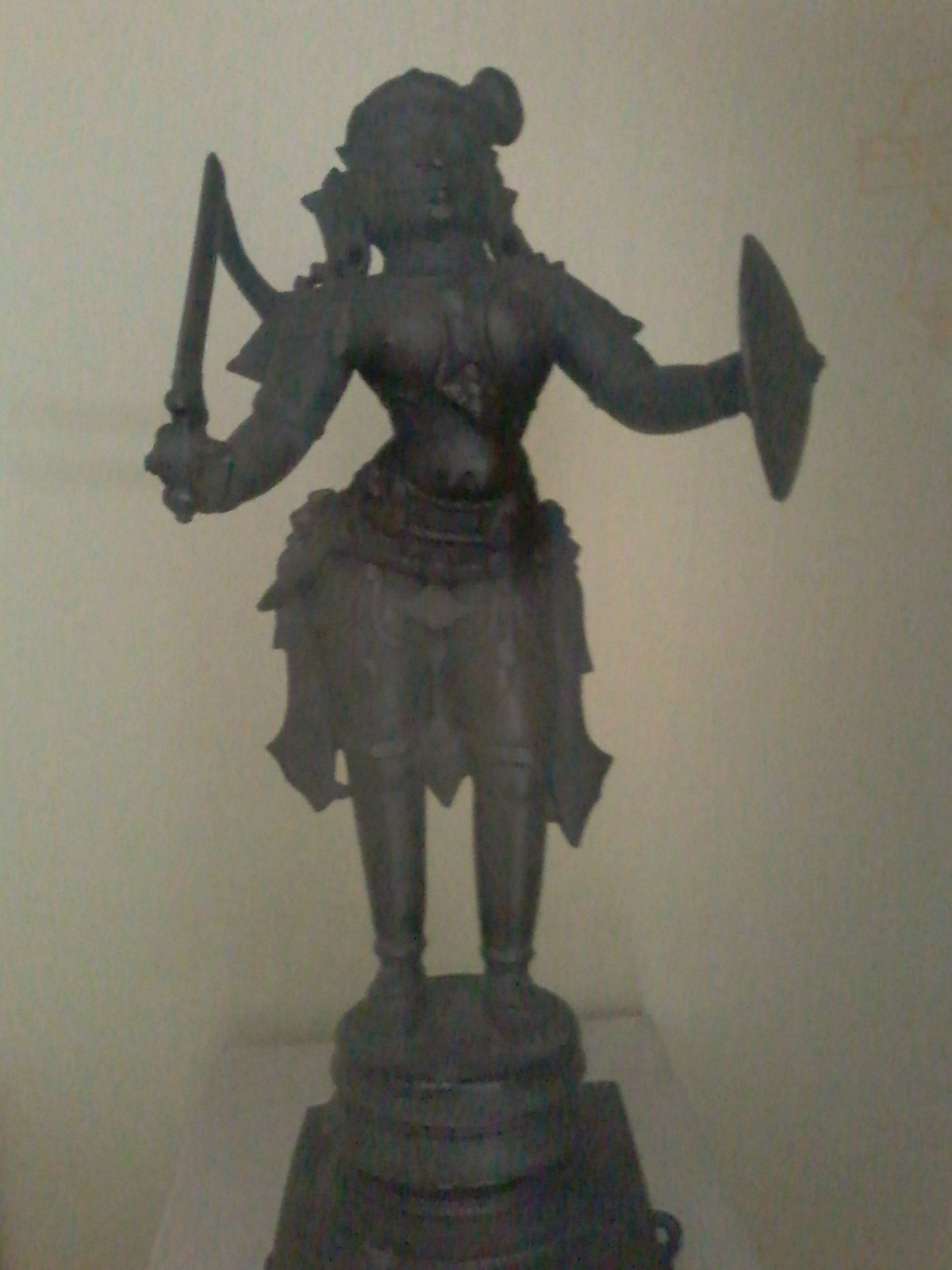
Figurine of Tirumangai, the author of this work

The opening ten verses of the Periya Tirumoli describe how Tirumangai was transformed after the meaning of the Narayana mantra dawned on him, which Sri Vaishnavism tradition acknowledges as the quintessential nature of the Vedas. The Periya Tirumoli is the magnum opus of Tirumangai Alvar, a composition of devotional verses dwelling on the greatness of several Vaishnava shrines, and the auspicious attributes of God as experienced by a bhakti saint. There are also hymns that explore human suffering caused by bondage, and the ways of overcoming this concept, ultimately leading to the attainment of the Ultimate Reality. As Vedanta Desika puts it, "the Periya Tirumoli provides a deep insight into the spiritual knowledge (arivu taruṁ Periya Tirumoli)."

== Hymns ==
Tirumangai describes Vishnu's Matsya avatara with these verses:

There was no higher ground;
Leaving not a spot uncovered,
the mighty flood swept high,
covering the prosperous lands
of the immortal ones.
The gods said:
we have no other refuge.
To be their fortress,
He, by his grace,
came as a fish.
The bowels (of the fish) shook in its haste,
the waves and waters of the ocean
crashed and rocked,
as he bore on his back the mountains
that scraped the skies.
My heart, do not forget
to worship this Lord.

— Periya Tirumoli, Verse 11.4.1

The saint also wrote taniyans (stray verses) in this text: A torch that drives off the darkness/ignorance from the heart, good ambrosia against the poison (nañcukku) that is unending rebirth (ațankā nețum pirati, lit. non-shortening long birth), literature/exemplification of the five [that are] the topics (turaikal) of the good treatise about Tamil, the essence of the Āraṇam [i.e. the Veda), a spark of fire (analin pori) that burns (lit. for) the cotton (thread] of other schools of thought (paracamaya-p-pañcukku): [these are] the treatises of Parakālan [i.e. Tirumankai Ālvār).

== See also ==
Topics in Tamil literature
Sangam Literature
Five Great Epics
Silappatikaram	Manimekalai
Civaka Cintamani	Valayapathi
Kundalakesi
Five Minor Epics
Neelakesi	Culamani
Naga Kumara Kaviyam	Udayana Kumara Kaviyam
Yashodhara Kaviyam
Bhakti Literature
Naalayira Divya Prabandham	Kamba Ramayanam
Tevaram	Tirumurai
Tamil people
Sangam	Sangam landscape
Tamil history from Sangam literature	Ancient Tamil music

- Tirunetuntantakam
- Tirukkuruntantakam
- Perumal Tirumoli
