= Vedarajan temple, Thirunagari =

Perumal temple in Mayiladuthurai district, Tamil Nadu, India

Vedarajan Temple
- Thirunagari Temple
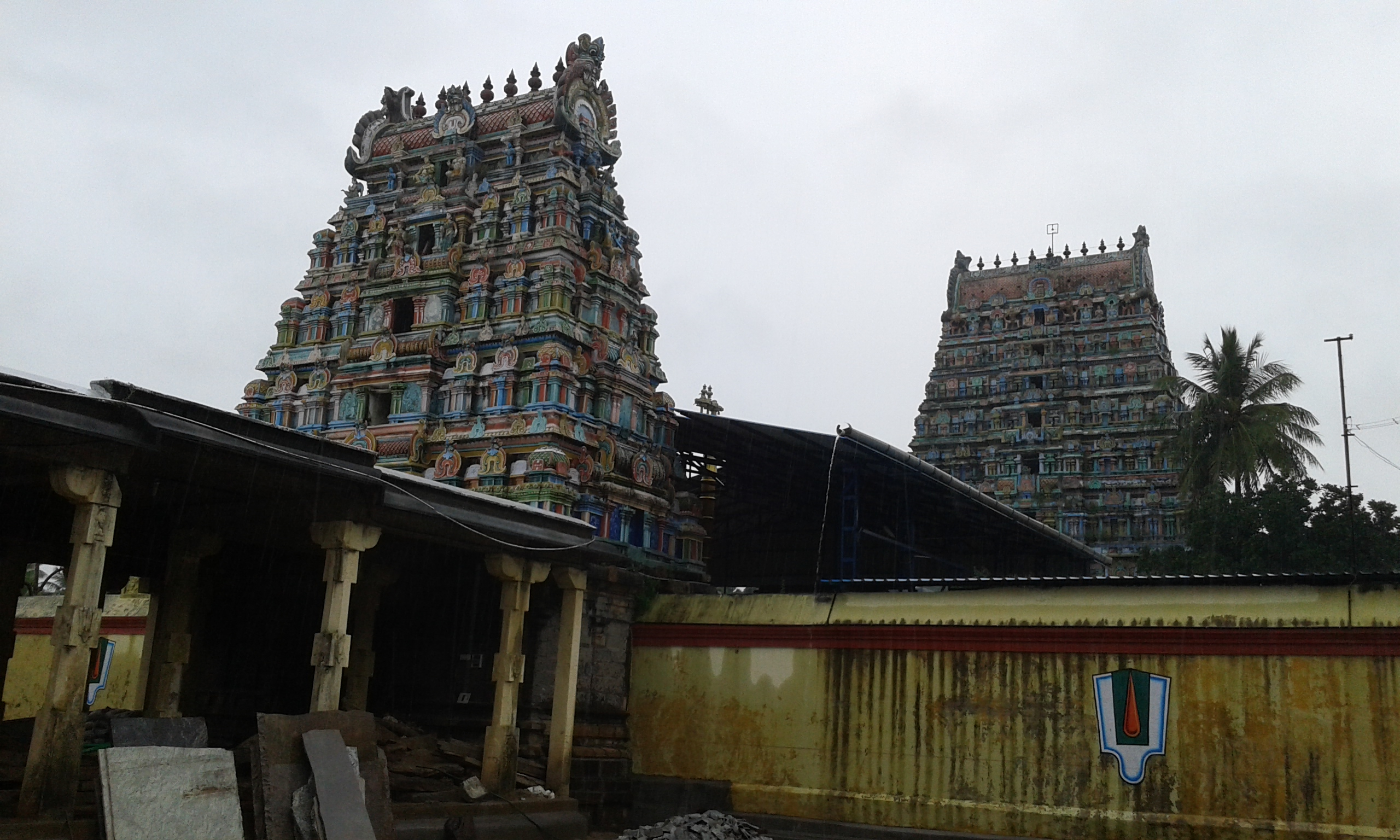

- Location in Tamil Nadu

Religion
- Affiliation: Hinduism
- District: Mayiladuthurai
- Deity: Vedarajan (Vishnu) Amruthavalli (Lakshmi)

Location
- Location: Thirunagari
- State: Tamil Nadu
- Country: India
- Interactive map of Vedarajan Temple
- Coordinates: 11°13′34″N 79°48′02″E

Architecture
- Type: Dravidian architecture

Vedarajan Temple in Thirunagari, a village in Mayiladuthurai district in the South Indian state of Tamil Nadu, is dedicated to the Hindu god Vishnu. Constructed in the Dravidian style of architecture, the temple is glorified in the Naalayira Divya Prabandham, the early medieval Tamil canon of the Alvar saints from the 6th–9th centuries CE. It is one of the 108 Divya Desams dedicated to Vishnu, who is worshipped as Vedarajan and his consort Lakshmi as Amruthavalli. The temple is believed to be the birthplace of Thirumangai Alvar, one of the twelve Alvar saints.

A granite wall surrounds the temple, enclosing all its shrines, while the water tank is located in a street axial to the eastern gateway. The temple has a seven-tiered rajagopuram, the gateway tower. The temple is originally believed to have been built by the Cholas, with later additions by the Vijayanagara and Thanjavur Nayak kings who commissioned pillared halls and major shrines of the temple during the 16th century.

Vedarajan is believed to have appeared to Thirumangai Alvar at this place. The temple follows the Tenkalai tradition of worship. Four daily rituals and three yearly festivals are held at the temple, of which the fourteen-day annual Brahmotsavam during the Tamil month of Vaikasi (May - June) being the most prominent. The temple is maintained and administered by the Hindu Religious and Endowment Board of the Government of Tamil Nadu.

== Legend ==
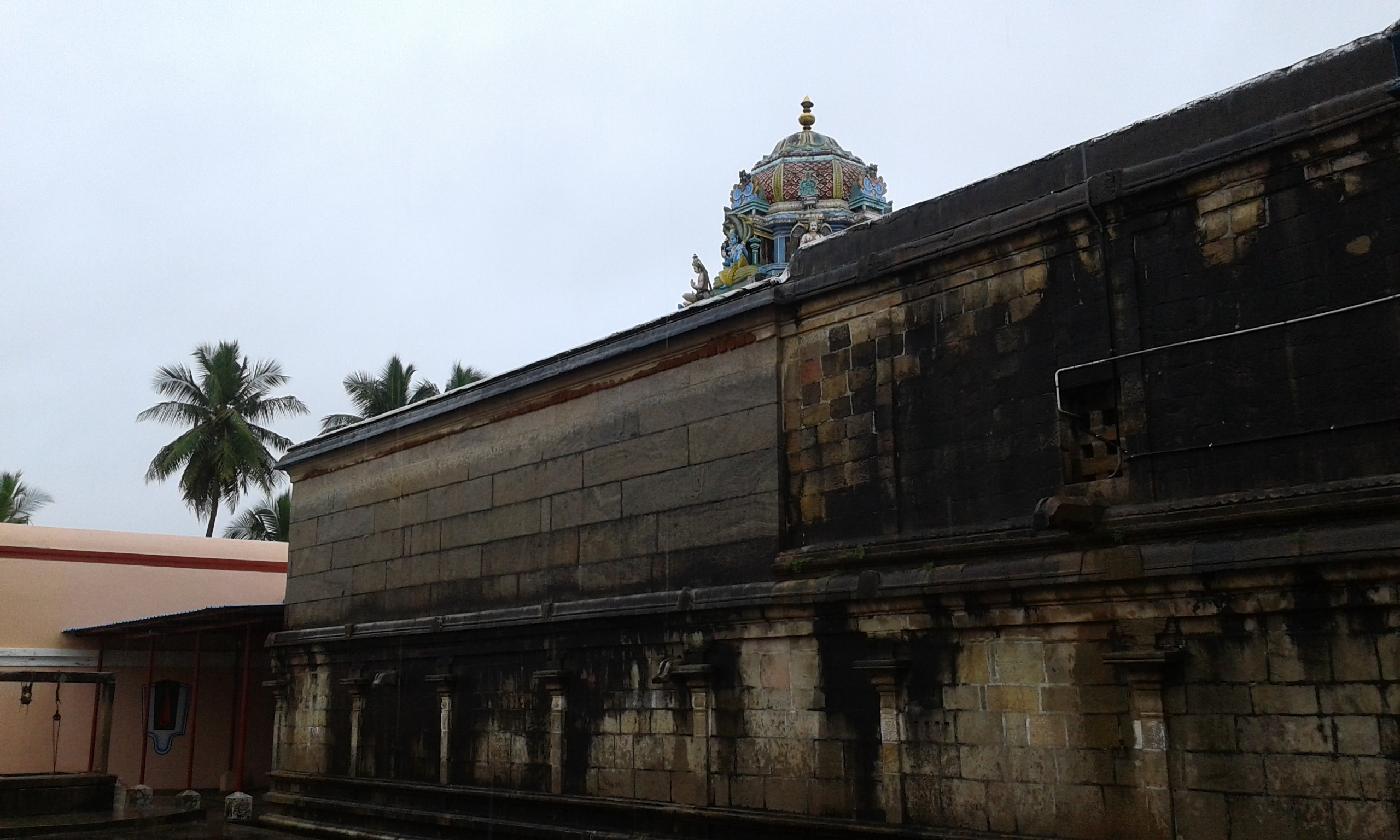
Image of the vimana, the shrine over the sanctum

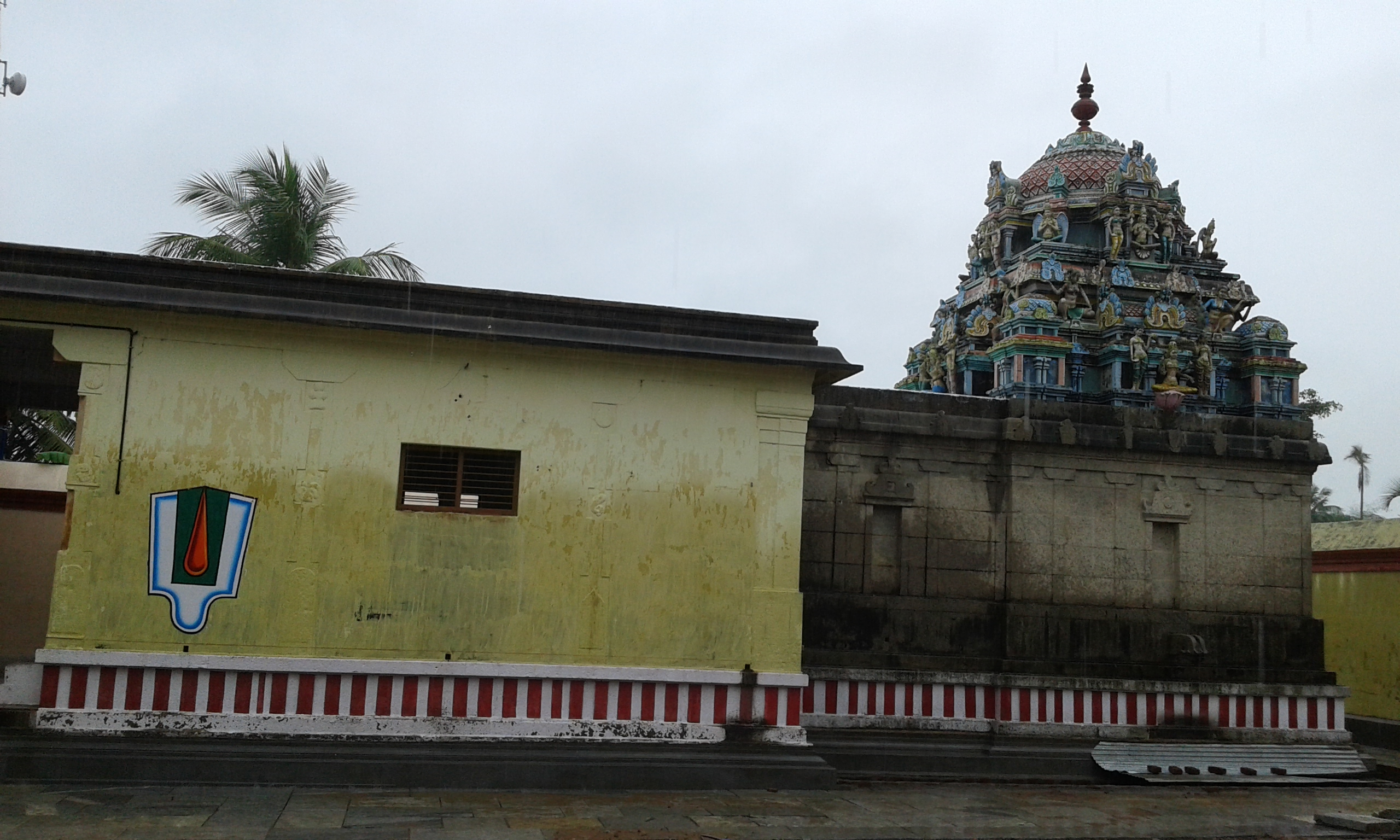
Shrine of Amruthavalli Thayar

As per Hindu legend, a son of Brahma named Karthama Prajapathi did penance worshipping Vishnu to attain Moksha. Vishnu was not pleased and Lakshmi, his consort was not convinced with Vishnu testing Karthama. She hid herself in the lotus tank at this place. Vishnu came in search of her and after finding her, he took her to Vaikunta. It is believed that Vishnu is sported in hugging posture in the nearby Thirungari also on account of the legend. Karthama took many births during various ages like Treta Yuga and Dvapara Yuga, but Vishnu told him that he would get Moksha only during Kali Yuga. During Kali Yuga, Karthama was born as prince Sangabalan. During his young age, he wanted to marry Kumudavalli. She was an ardent devotee of Vishnu and stipulated that she would marry him only if he feeds thousand Vaishnavites, the devotees of Vishnu. Sangabalan started feeding the devotees and he also resorted to burglary to fund it. Vishnu came with Lakshmi incognito in his path and he tried to rob them as well. Vishnu uttered the Ashtatra Mantra in his ears and he turned into Thirumangai Alvar. Since Vishnu in the form of Ranganatha offered a darshana to the Alvar and his wife, the presiding deity is called Kalyana Ranganatha. The place is locally called Alvar Koil and also called Vedarajapuram.

== History and literary mention ==
While the exact history of the temple could not be ascertained, it is originally believed to have been built by the Cholas, with later additions by the Vijayanagar and Thanjavur Nayak kings who commissioned pillared halls and major shrines of the temple during the 16th century. Vedarajan temple is revered in the Naalayira Divya Prabhandam, the 7th–9th century Vaishnava canon, by Kulasekara Alvar and Thirumangai Alvar. The temple is classified as a Divya Desam, one of the 108 Vishnu temples that are mentioned in the book. During the 18th and 19th centuries, the temple finds mention in several works like 108 Tirupathi Anthathi by Divya Kavi Pillai Perumal Aiyangar. In modern times, the temple is maintained and administered by the Hindu Religious and Endowment Board of the Government of Tamil Nadu.

== Architecture ==
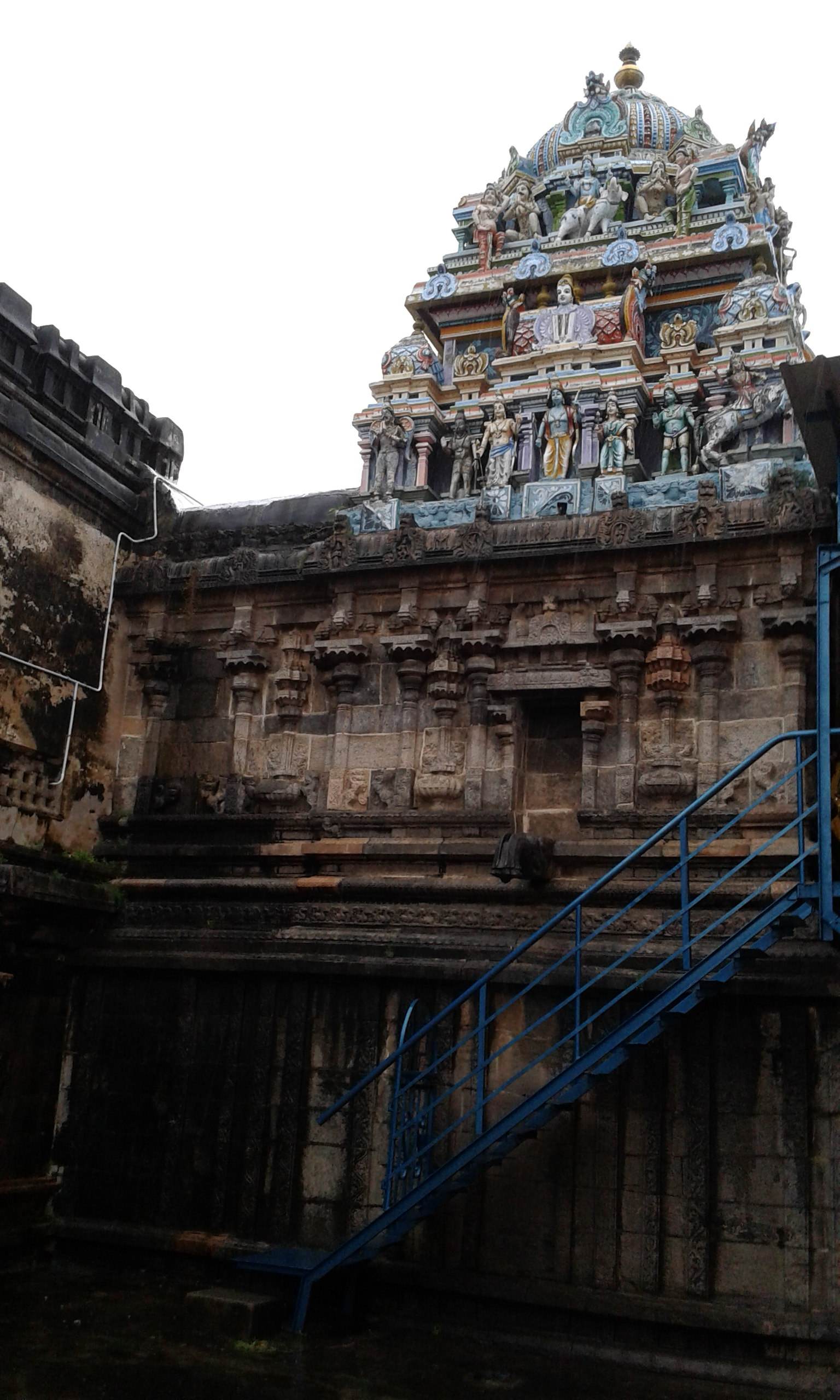
Shrine of Thirumangai Alvar

Vedarajan temple covers an area of about 2 acres (0.81 hectares) and has a seven-tiered gopuram (gateway tower) raising to a height of 125 ft (38 m). The temple in enclosed in a rectangular enclosure with huge granite walls. The sanctum is approached through a second gateway tower. There are a series of pillared structure around the basement of the first enclosure. The central shrine has an elevated structure and houses the image of the presiding deity, Vedarajan. The image is made of granite is sported in sitting posture. The festival deity is named Kalyana Ranganathar and the image is also housed in the sanctum. The vimana, the shrine over the sanctum is Ashtanga in architecture, which has eight parts. The outer parts of the vimana has stucco images of sages, Dasavatara, Lakshmi Narasimha, Lakshmi Narayana and other Avatars of Vishnu. A north facing shrine of Thirumangai Alvar is located in the same elevated enclosure. There is a separate flag staff for the Alvar shrine. It is believed that the two images of Narasimhar in the temple are among the five original images of Narasimha worshipped by Thirumangai Alvar. There is a small image of Chindanaikiniyan, which is also believed to have been worshipped by the Alvar. The shrine of Amruthavalli is located in the basement, in the diagonal corner of the first enclosure.

== Religious practices and festival ==
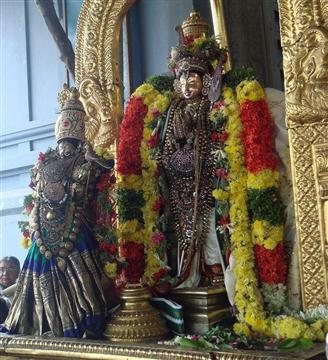
Thirumangai Alvar with his consort Kumudavalli

The temple follows the traditions of the Tenkalai follows Vaikanasam aagama. The temple is open from 7:30-11:30 am and between 4.30_8.00 pm. The temple priests perform the pooja (rituals) during festivals and on a daily basis. The temple rituals are performed four times a day: Kalasanthi at 8:00 a.m., Uchikalam at 12:00 p.m., Sayarakshai at 5:00 p.m., and Aravanai Pooja at 8:00 p.m. There are weekly, monthly and fortnightly rituals performed in the temple.

The Thirumangai Alvar Mangalasasana Utsavam is the most prominent festival of the temple. During the new moon day of the Tamil month Thai (January - February), the festival deity of Thirumangai Alvar is taken to the Thirumanimadam from Thirunagari. The major event of the festival is Garudasevai in which the festival images of the eleven Thirunangur Tirupathis are brought on mount designed like Garuda, called Garuda Vahana, to Thirunangur. The festive image of Thirumangai Alvar is brought on a Hamsa Vahanam (palanquin) and his paasurams (verses) dedicated to each of these eleven temples are recited during the occasion. The festival images of Thirumangai Alvar and his consort Kumudavalli Naachiyar are taken in the palanquin to each of the eleven temples. The verses dedicated to each of the eleven temples are chanted in the respective shrines. This is one of the most important festivals in the region attended by thousands of pilgrims. The other festivals celebrated in the temple are the ten-day Vaikasi Swathi festival, Pavitrotsavam during Aani (June - July) and Panguni Uthiram during Panguni (March - April).
