= Ciriya Tirumatal =

Work of Tamil Hindu literature

- ← Tiruvelukkutrirukkai Periya Tirumatal →
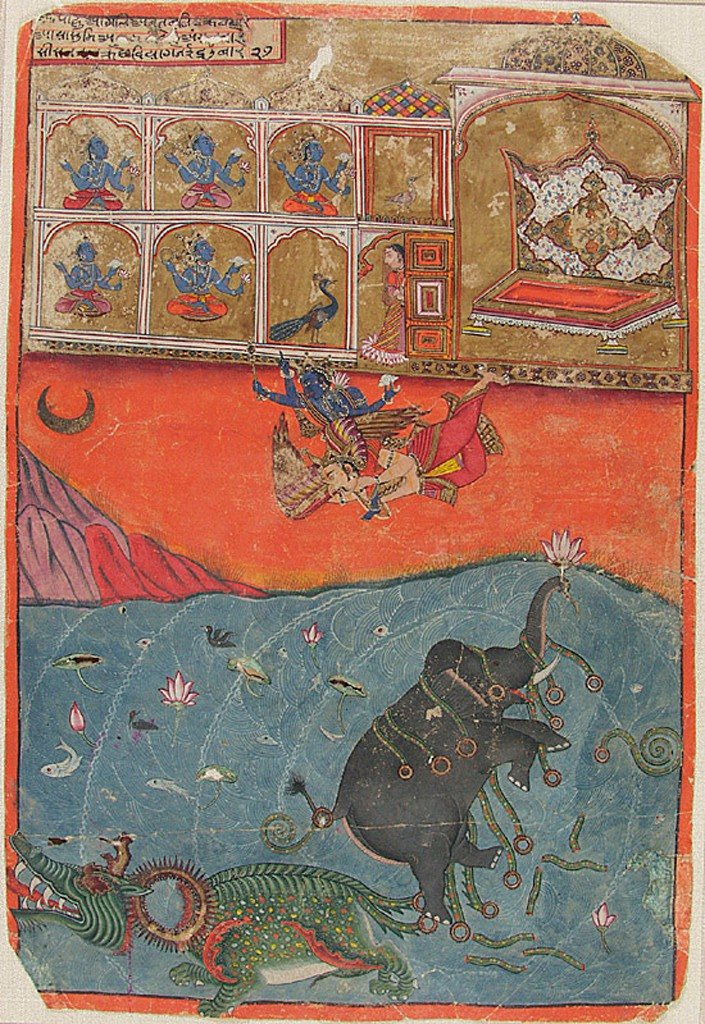
- The episode of the Gajendra Moksha, featured in this work. Folio from the Arthur M. Sackler Museum.

Information
- Religion: Hinduism
- Author: Tirumangai Alvar
- Language: Tamil
- Period: 9th–10th century CE
- Verses: 40

The Ciriya Tirumatal (Tamil: சிறிய திருமடல், romanized: Ciṟiya Tirumaṭal, lit. 'The small and sacred maṭal') is a Tamil Hindu work of literature written by Tirumangai Alvar, one of the twelve Alvars of Sri Vaishnavism. The work is a part of the compendium of hymns called the Nalayira Divya Prabandham. In the forty hymns of this work, the author expresses his devotion and love to the preserver deity, Vishnu, and also lists twenty-seven sites he would like to visit to venerate the deity.

== Hymns ==
=== Theme ===
Along with its companion poem called the Periya Tirumatal, the Ciriya Tirumatal employs a poetic device from Sangam literature called the maṭal. This referred to an ancient Tamil custom through which a lovesick man attempted to win the heart of his beloved by refusing food and drink, bathing, sleep, and other daily activities, and wandered the streets while singing about the woman he loved. In a last resort, the man expressed his willingness to take his own life in the presence of his beloved. The custom was romanticised, and hence traditionally ended with the woman being moved by the devotion of the man, agreeing to marry him. In this work, Tirumangai Alvar assumes the role of a gopika, a milk-maid lover of Krishna, and performs a maṭal to win the deity's heart. By doing so, he breaks the convention of women not being allowed to perform the custom, citing his adherence to the northern Sanskrit school of Sri Vaishnavism as opposed to the southern Tamil school.

A stanza of the Ciriya Tirumatal describes the legend of the Gajendra Moksha, Vishnu's rescue of an elephant from the jaws of a crocodile:

When the huge elephant stood in the
lotus tank,
Battling with the consuming crocodile,
And offered a lotus with his long trunk
bellowing,

"Narayana!
O Gem-hued Lord!
O Serpent-recliner!
Come to my help!
Save me!",
The lord heard it and came,
Sliced the crocodile's jaws into two,

And redeemed the suffering elephant

— Tirumangai Alvar, Ciriya Tirumatal

== See also ==
Topics in Tamil literature
Sangam Literature
Five Great Epics
Silappatikaram	Manimekalai
Civaka Cintamani	Valayapathi
Kundalakesi
Five Minor Epics
Neelakesi	Culamani
Naga Kumara Kaviyam	Udayana Kumara Kaviyam
Yashodhara Kaviyam
Bhakti Literature
Naalayira Divya Prabandham	Kamba Ramayanam
Tevaram	Tirumurai
Tamil people
Sangam	Sangam landscape
Tamil history from Sangam literature	Ancient Tamil music

- Tiruvelukkutrirukkai
- Periya Tirumatal
- Kanninun Cirutampu
