= Thirumanimadam =

Perumal temple in Mayiladuthurai district, Tamil Nadu, India

- Manimadakoil
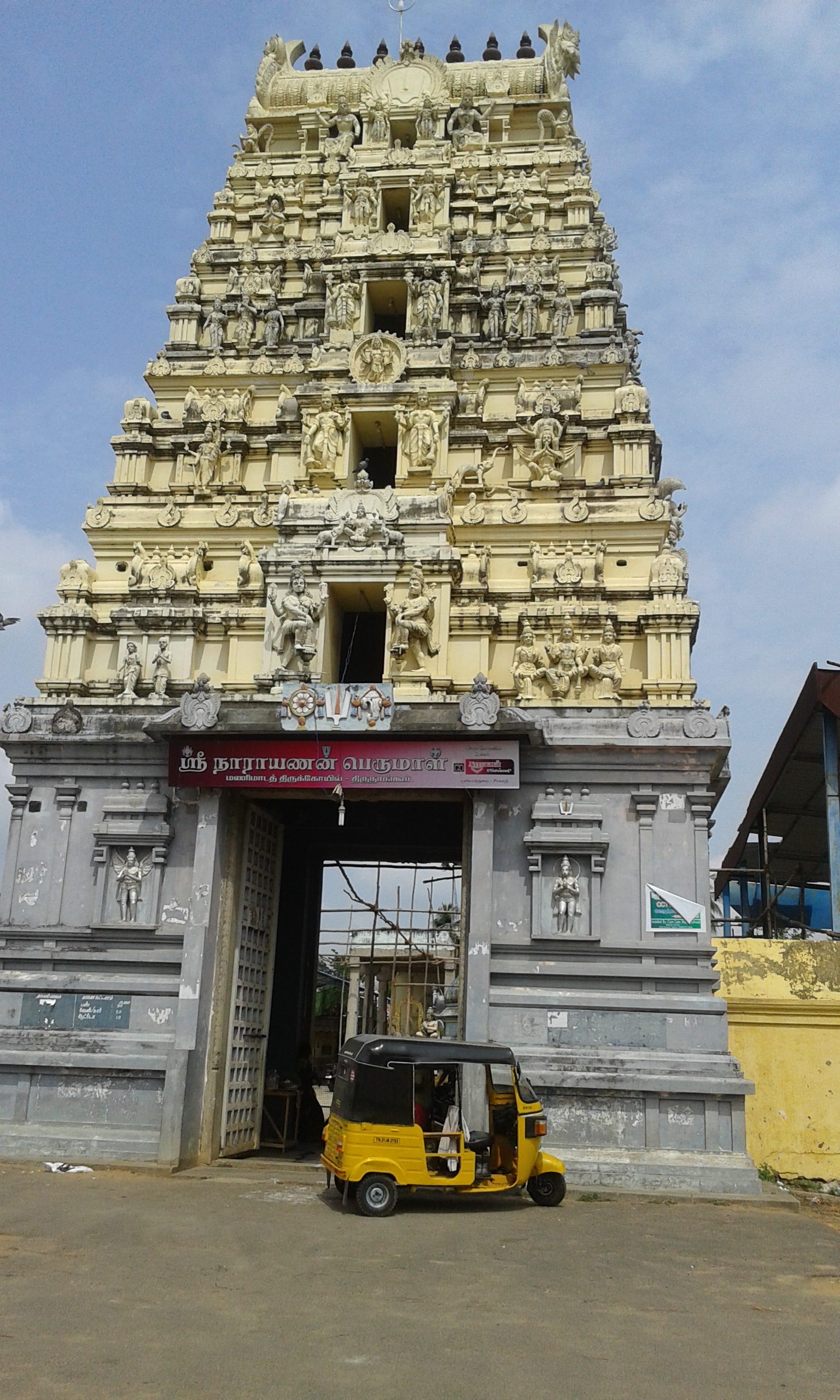

- Location in Tamil Nadu

Religion
- Affiliation: Hinduism
- District: Mayiladuthurai
- Deity: Narayanan Perumal(Vishnu) PundareekaValli(Lakshmi)
- Features: Tower: Pranava

Location
- Location: Thirunangur
- State: Tamil Nadu
- Country: India
- Coordinates: 11°10′39″N 79°46′45″E

Architecture
- Type: Dravidian architecture

Thirumanimadam or Narayanan Perumal Temple (also called Badrinarayana Perumal Temple) is dedicated to the Hindu god Vishnu located in Thirunangur, a village in the outskirts of Sirkazhi in the Indian state of Tamil Nadu. Constructed in the Dravidian style of architecture, the temple is glorified in the Nalayira Divya Prabandham, the early medieval Tamil canon of the Alvar saints from the 6th–9th centuries CE. It is one of the 108 Divya Desams dedicated to Vishnu, who is worshipped as Narayanan and his consort Lakshmi as Pundarikavalli.

It is one among the eleven Divya Desams of Thirunangur Tirupathis and is closely associated with Thirumangai Alvar. The Thirumangai Alvar Mangalasasana Utsavam celebrated annually during the Tamil month of Thai is the major festival of the temple during which the festival images of the eleven Thirunangur Tirupatis are brought on mount designed like Garuda, called Garuda Vahana, to Thirunangur.

== Legend ==
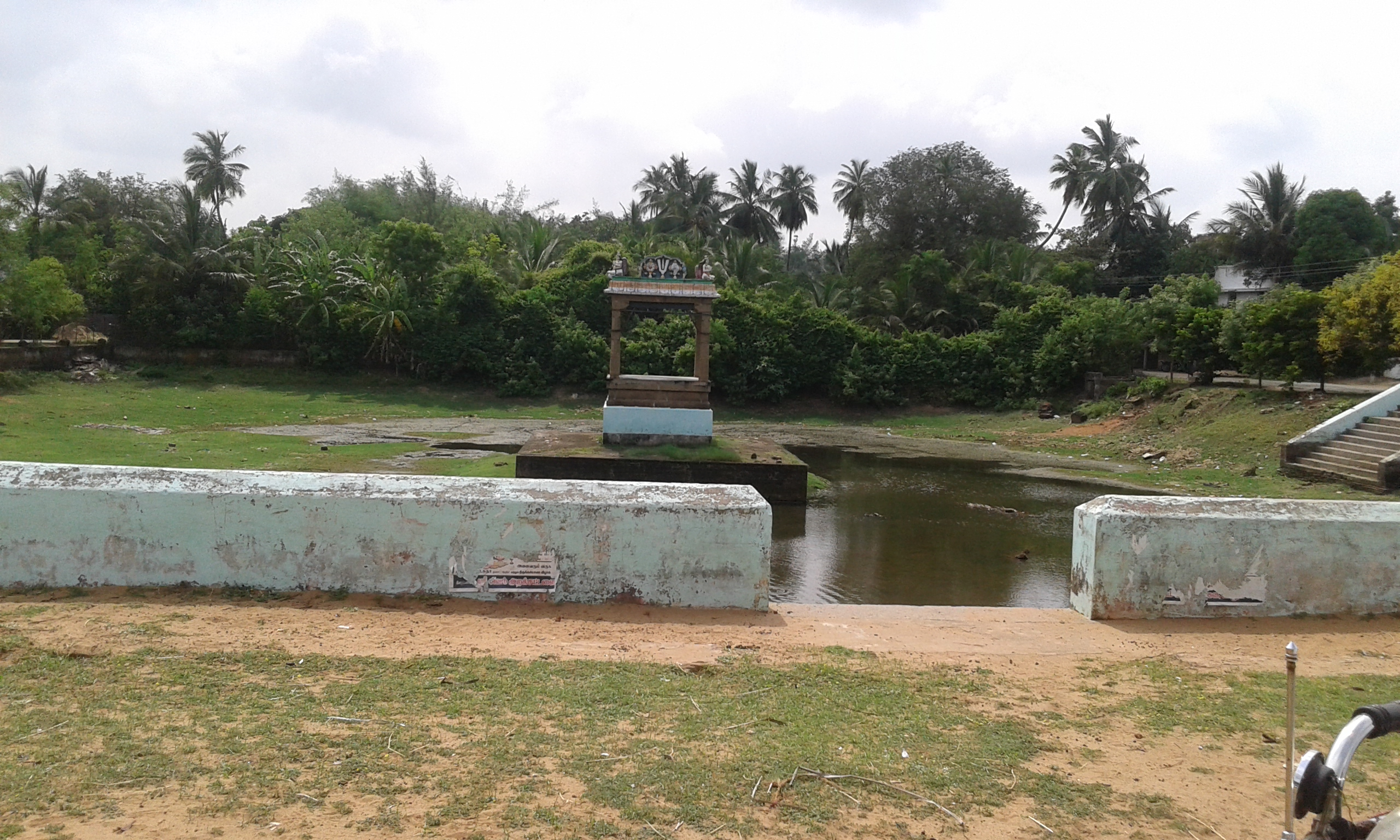
Temple tank located outside the temple premises

The legend of all the eleven temples of Thirunangur are closely associated with each other. As per legend, the Hindu god Shiva started dancing in fury at this place after the death of his consort Uma due to the yajna (sacrifice) of Daksha. Each time his lock of hair touched the ground, there were eleven other forms of Shiva who appeared. The celestial deities were worried that if the dance continues, it would result in decimation of entire creations. They prayed to Vishnu for help, who appeared at this place. On seeing Vishnu, Shiva's anger was reduced and he requested Vishnu to appear in eleven forms like he did. On his request, Vishnu appeared in eleven different forms at Tirunangur. The eleven places where Vishnu appeared are believed to be where the eleven temples in Tirunangur are located. As per another variant, Shiva requested Vishnu to appear in eleven different forms like him to control the eleven Shiva forms he created. The presiding deity of Badrinath Temple, Badrinath, is believed to have visited the place on the request of Shiva. Ramanuja is believed to have learnt Tirumandiram from Thirukoshtiyur Nambi at this place.

== Architecture ==
It is located in Thirunangur, a small village, 10 km away from Sirkali en route to Thiruvenkadu. The temple tank is located right across the temple. Inscriptions from 10th-century Chola and Nayakkar periods are seen in the temple. The temple has a five-tiered rajagopuram (gateway tower) and all the shrines of the temple are enshrined in a granite wall. The central shrine is built on an elevated structure and is reached by a flight of steps. There is a hall adjacent to the right of the rajagopuram, where the festival image of the fourteen temples in Thirunangur and its surrounds are housed during the Thirumangai Alvar Utsavam. The shrine of the consort of Narayana Perumal is located in the second precinct around the sanctum. The image of the presiding deity is sported in the sanctum in standing posture facing east. The temple tank is located opposite to the gopuram. There are three holes in the gopuram, through which the rays of the sun fall on the image of the presiding deity. As per the legend, Surya, the son god, is believed to worship Vishnu round the year.

== Religious significance ==
The temple is revered in Nalayira Divya Prabhandam, the 7th–9th century Vaishnava canon, by Peryalvar, Thirumalisai Alvar and Thirumangai Alvar. The temple is classified as a Divyadesam, one of the 108 Vishnu temples that are mentioned in the book. During the 18th and 19th centuries, the temple finds mention in several works like 108 Tirupati Antati by Divya Kavi Pillai Perumal Aiyangar. It is believed that saint Thirumanagai Alvar visits the place every year to the festival to consecrate the eleven deities. As per local beliefs, the fresh winds which swirl the paddy fields before the day of the festival indicates a good harvest for the season. As per the accounts provided by the Alvar saints, the place was called Thirumanimadam on account of the rich houses in the locality which had balconies. As per another legend, the sages Madangar, Domyar, Vyagrapadar and Udangar set up their hermitages in this place. According to the epic Mahabharata, Datsagan, the mighty snake king who killed king Parikshit, ruled the place called Nagapuri, which eventually became Nangur.

== Religious practices and festivals ==
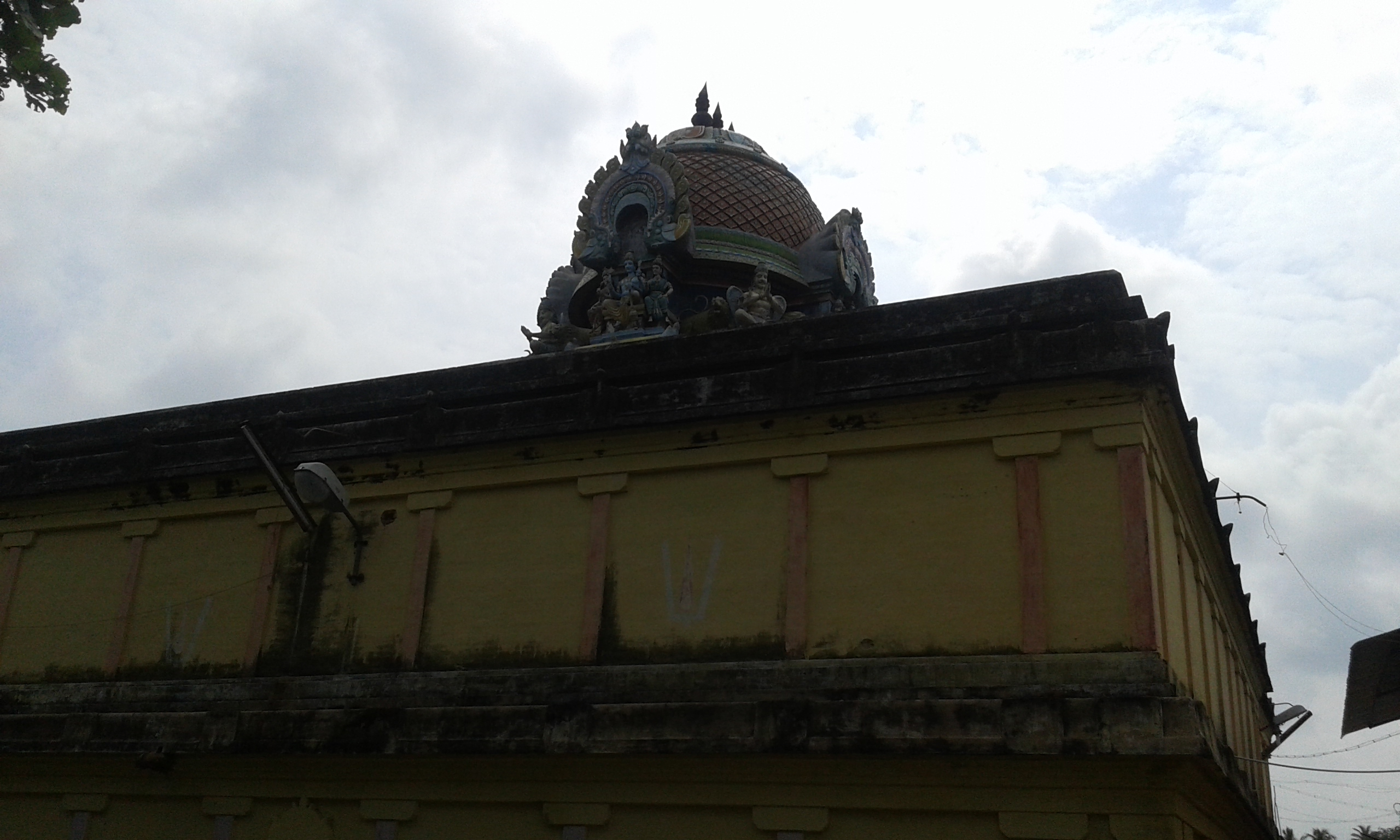
The vimanam - structure over the sanctum

During the new moon day of the Tamil month Thai, the festival deity of Thirumangai Alvar is brought to the temple from Thiruvali-Thirunagari. The Thirumangai Alvar Mangalasasana Utsavam is celebrated in the Tamil month of Thai (January–February). The highlight of the festival is Garudasevai, an event in which the festival images of the eleven Thirunangur Tirupathis are brought on mount designed like Garuda, called Garuda Vahana, to Thirunangur. The festive image of Thirumangai Alvar is also brought on a Hamsa Vahanam (palanquin) and his pasurams (verses) dedicated to each of these eleven temples are recited during the occasion. The festival images of Thirumangai Alvar and his consort Kumudavalli Naachiyar are taken in a palanquin to each of the eleven temples. The verses dedicated to each of the eleven temples are chanted in the respective shrines. This is one of the most important festivals in the region which draws thousands of visitors.

== Sources ==
- R., Dr. Vijayalakshmy (2001). An introduction to religion and Philosophy - Tévarám and Tivviyappirapantam (1st ed.). Chennai: International Institute of Tamil Studies.
- Ayyar, P. V. Jagadisa (1982). South Indian Shrines: Illustrated. New Delhi: Asian Educational Services. p. 535. ISBN 9788120601512.
