= Thirumangai Alvar =

Tamil Vaishnava poet-saint

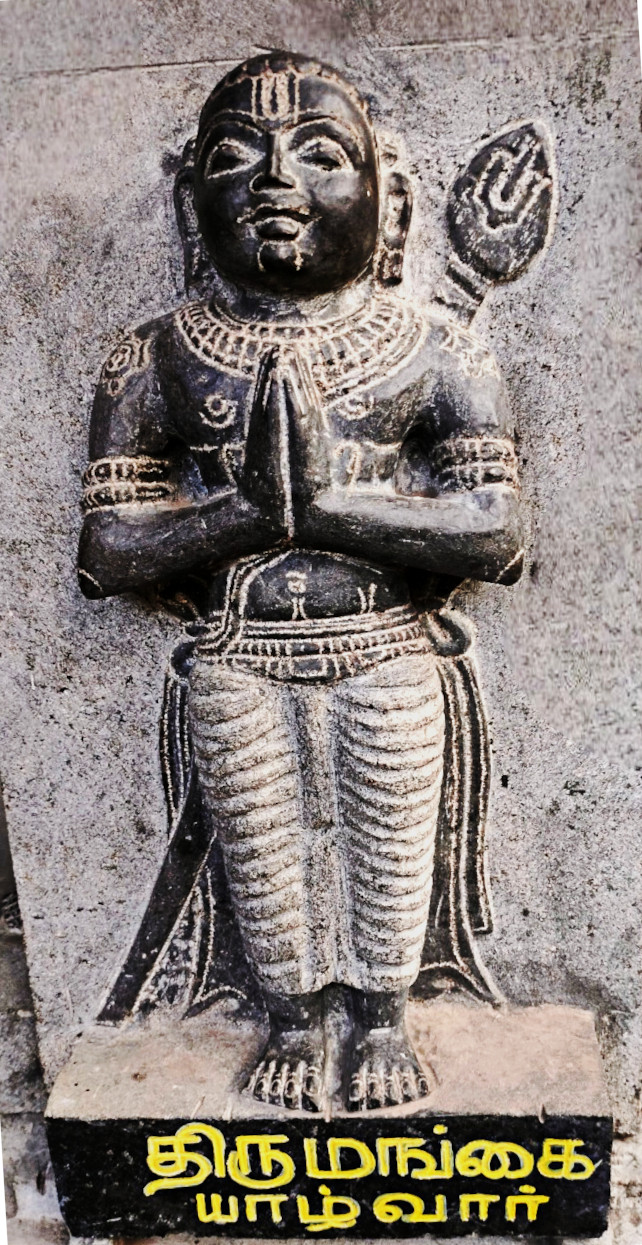
- Sculpture of Tirumangai Alvar, Yoga Narasimhar Temple, Velachery, Chennai

Personal life
- Born: Kaliyan the 8th century CE (traditional dating: 2702 BCE) Thirukkuraiyalur (Thiruvali-Thirunagari), Sirkazhi, Mayiladuthurai
- Died: Thirukkurungudi (Thirunelveli dist.)
- Notable work(s): Periya Tirumoli; Tirunetuntantakam; Tirukkuruntantakam; Tiruvelukkutrirukkai; Ciriya Tirumatal; Periya Tirumatal
- Other name: Parakalan

Religious life
- Religion: Hinduism
- Philosophy: Vaishnava Bhakti

Thirumangai Alvar (IAST:Tirumaṅgai Āḻvār ), also referred to as Thirumangai Mannan is the last of the 12 Alvar saints of south India, who are known for their affiliation to the Vaishnava tradition of Hinduism. He is considered one of the most learned Alvars, and the most superior Alvar in the context of composition of verses. He holds the title Narkavi Perumal, the mark of an excellent poet, and Parakala (Beyond Time).

Though he is respected as a Vaishnava saint-poet, he was born as a Kshatriya and initially worked as a military commander under the Cholas, a chieftain, and then a robber. After his conversion to Vaishnavism, he confronted practitioners the sect of Shaivism, as well as Buddhism and Jainism.

== Dating and hagiography ==
The traditional date attributed to Thirumangai is year 399 of Kali Yuga, that is 2702 or 2706 BCE, making him traditionally the last of the Alvar saints. Modern scholars have placed the Alvars in between 5th to 9th centuries based on few historical evidence. Dr. N. Subba Reddiar summarizes their views and arrives at the date 776 AD for Thirumangai, making him chronologically the eighth Alvar, though even these dates are disputed. Sakkottai Krishnaswami Aiyangar notes he is generally dated to 7th-8th century. Professor of Religion and Asian Studies, James G. Lochtefeld of Carthage College dates Thirumangai to the 9th century. He is generally considered to be a contemporary of Pallava king Nandivarman II (731 CE - 796 CE) as he refers to the later Pallavas of Pallava dynasty in his hymns.

The hagiographies detailing the life of Thirumangai and other Alvars are Divya charitam (11th century) and Guruparampara-prabhavam-arayirappadi (13th century) and Guruparampara-prabhavam-muvayirappadi (14th century). Other Vaishnava scholars have written hagiographics based on the above works later.

== Early life ==
Thirumangai was born in the Kallar (Thevar) caste in Thirukuraiyalur, a small village in Sirkazhi, Mayiladuthurai district, Tamil Nadu. Thirumangai's real name was Kaliyan or Kalikanti. Thirumangai's father was Nilam, a general under the Chola Empire. He was skilled in archery and worked as a military commander himself for the Chola king. In recognition of his valour, he was conferred upon the title Parakala and rewarded a small territory called Ali Nadu to govern, for his military services. Its capital was Thirumangai. He earned the title Thirumangai Mannan or chief of Thirumangai, a name he maintained even when he became a saint.

== Married life ==
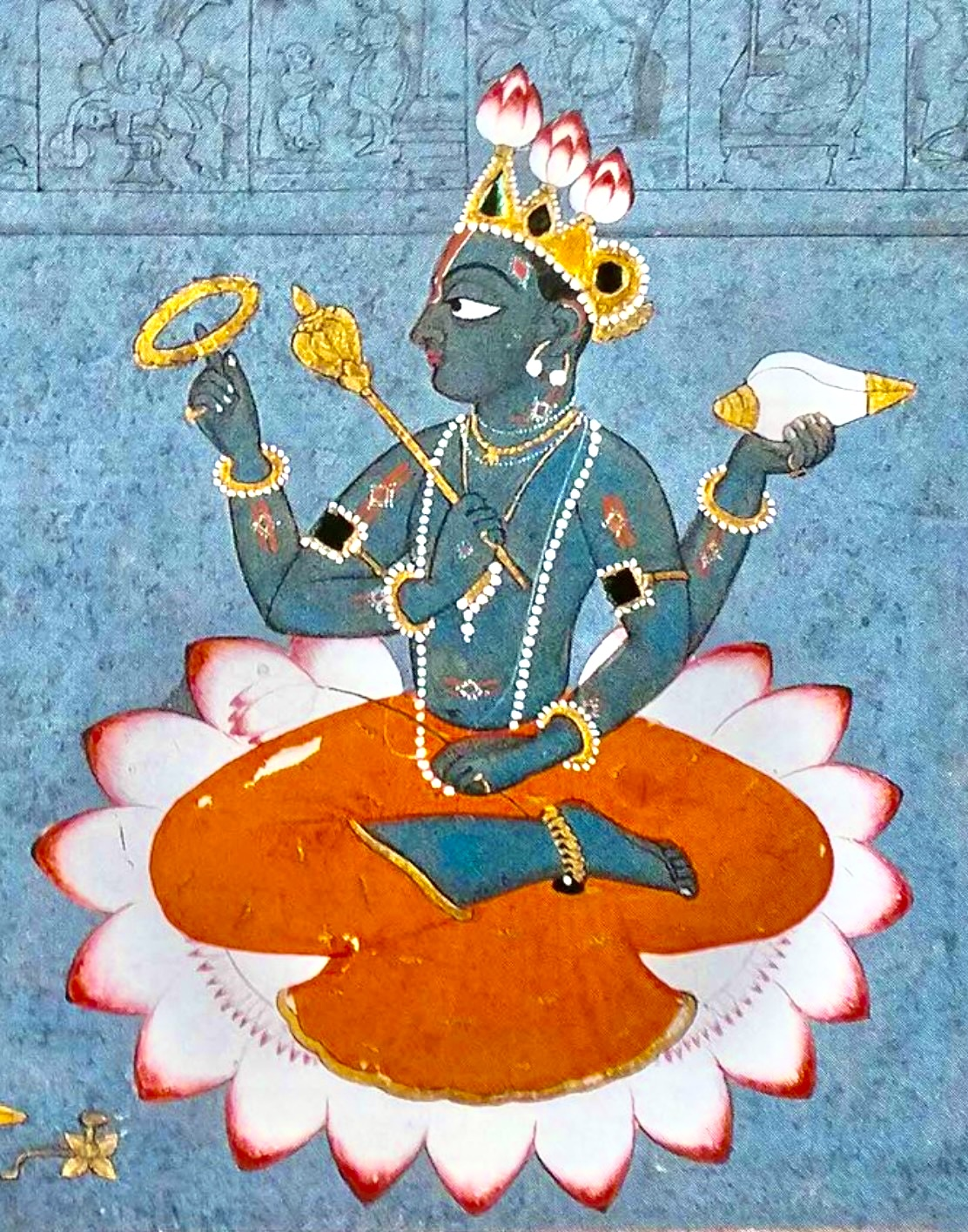
Vishnu was the patron deity of Thirumangai Alvar and is believed to have given a vision to the saint.

According to the traditional accounts, he fell in love with Kumudavalli, a Vaishnava doctor's adopted daughter at Thiruvellakkulam (also known as Annan Kovil). She gave a set of conditions that he must become a Vaishnavaite and that he must feed a thousand people for over a year, every day. During that process, he was so attracted to Vaishnavism that he started constructing temple walls for Srirangam. Unable to bear the heavy expense of feeding a thousand people, Kaliyan resorted to highway robbery. One day, he saw a group of people returning from a marriage, with the bride and groom. He and his assistants were able to get all the loot, but the toe ring from the groom was left. He tried to remove them, but could not do so. Then he realised the bridegroom was none other than Vishnu himself. Narayana revealed himself to Kaliyan and transformed him by teaching the Narayana mantra or Ashtakshara (the eight syllabled) – Om Namo Narayanaya, turning the robber into a saint, and starts singing the first verse of Periya Tirumoli (Vaadinen Vaadi). The temple-god of Thirunaraiyur (Naraiyur Nindra Nambi) – a form of Vishnu – is believed to have initiated Thirumangai into Vaishnavism, by teaching him the pancha samskara.

The first ten verses of Thirumangai's poem Periya Tirumoli sing of his transformation, after receiving the spiritual knowledge from Vishnu. He sings about his transformation thus:

I became a thief
deceitful and dishonest
I wandered hither and thither
yet light dawned upon me –
I reached Your feet
and instantly your grace fell upon me
with melting heart and choked voice
your praises I sing
bathed in streaming tears
I repeat day and night
the sacred name of Narayana (Vishnu)

== As a Vaishnava saint ==
Transformed by his encounter with God, Thirumangai gave up his chieftainship and became a devout Vaishnava, dedicated to god Vishnu. To atone for his sins, he visited 88 of the Divya Desams, a group of 108 Vishnu shrines primarily in south India. He spread the poems of older Alvars in his wandering. He was also well versed in earlier Tamil literature like Naaladiyar, Thirukkural, Sangam literature, and Jain literature.

Thirumangai preached against penance and advocated bhakti (devotion) as way to attain salvation. He composed 6 poems in Tamil, together acoounting for 1361 verses. In the book Divya Prabandham, 1361 verses of Thirumangai are included, making them the most composed by any Alvar. Tamil Vaishnavas consider them as the six Tamil Vedangas or Angas of the 4 poems of Nammalvar, which are considered as Vedas. His most important work is Periya Tirumoli, composed of 1084 hymns. The others are: Tirunetuntantakam (30 verses), Tirukkuruntantakam (20 verses), Tiruvelukkutirukkai (a single long poem of 47 lines), Siriya Tirumadal (155 lines) and Periya Tirumadal (297 lines).

A late ninth-century text, Tamilalangaram by Dandapani Swamigal describes him of having the rare privilege of biting god Vishnu's toes and being pardoned for all his sins, as he wrote in Tamil. Vaishnavas consider him as a divine incarnation of Sharanga, Vishnu's bow.

== Works ==
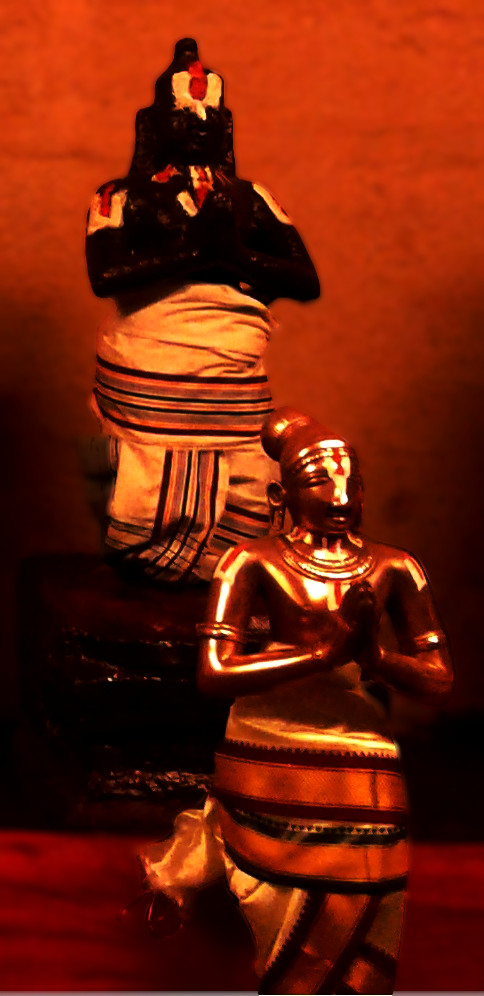
Image of the granite and festival image of Thirumangai in Alwarthirunagari Temple

The Periya Tirumoli is the composition of hymns illustrating the greatness of Vaishnava shrines and their presiding deity as well as God's numerous attributes. His songs extol the largest number of shrines – over 40 forms of Vishnu, from Badrinath in North India to Thirukkurungudi in the extreme South. Thirumangai also discusses causes of human suffering and ways to overcome it to achieve salvation. Vedanta Desika praises the work as "a deep insight in spiritual knowledge".

The word tandakam in Tirunetuntantakam and Tirukkuruntantakam refers to the staff used for support for climbing a hill, this refers to God as the support for sustence of the soul in context of the poems. The words nedu and kuru signify the length of the compositions and its poetic meter. In Tirunetuntantakam, Thirumangai speaks as a Nayaki (consort of the Lord), who separated from her beloved God (Nayaka). Tirukkuruntantakam speaks dependency of the soul on God and its way to escape suffering with the help of Vishnu, who is the sole supporter.

Tiruvelukkutirukkai deals with the concept of surrender to God to attain freedom from suffering, the nature of God and the means of attaining Him.

Periya Tirumatal and Ciriya Tirumatal use the matal, an ancient Tamil custom which is practised by a rejected lover to win back his love, though it is prohibited for women. The custom evolves singing about his love in love, devoid of food and sleep and finally trying to commit suicide before her if all things fail. Thirumangai sings as a woman threatening Lord to finish her life if He can not reciprocate her love. He assumes the role of a gopika (milkmaid) who threatens Krishna (a form of Vishnu) with madal. He defends the gopika's actions of performing the prohibited madal, by saying that he follows the Sanskrit literary tradition who permits madal for women, not the Tamil one. His songs are also based on akam love poems, and talk of employing bees and storks are messengers to God. He goes to the length of portraying himself as the nayaki, pining for the love of Vishnu.

== Meeting with Shaiva Saint ==
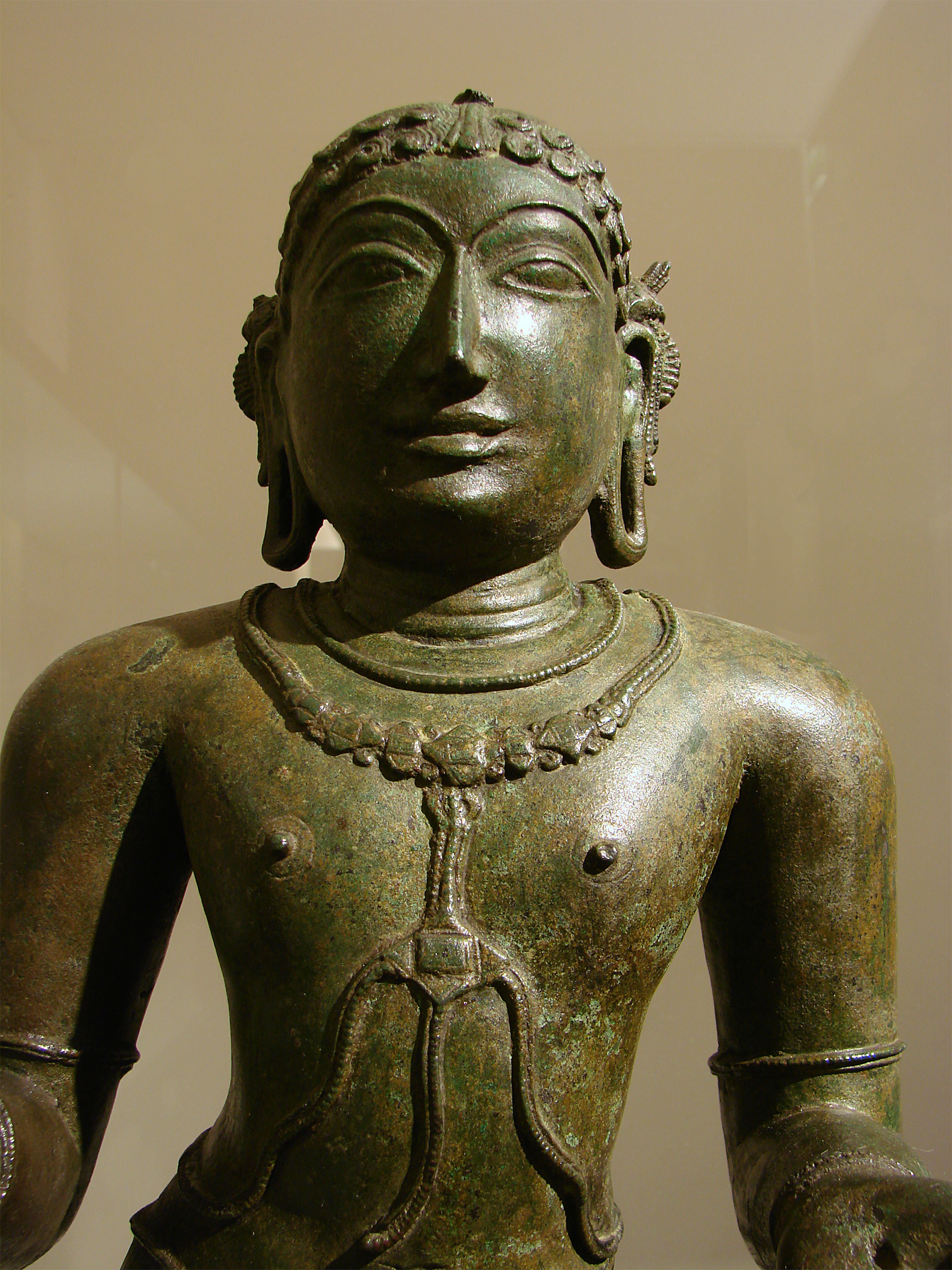
Thirumangai is described to have met the Shaiva saint Thirugnana Sambandhar (pictured).

Guruparamparai prabhavams tell of his meeting with Thirugnana Sambandhar, a Shaiva saint, who went to meet Thirumangai on his own and invited Thirumangai to his home town Sirkazhi so that Thirumangai would compose a poem in praise of the local deity Thadaalan. On the request of Thirugnana sambandhar at Sirkazhi, Thirumangai composed a poem on the spot, which was admired by the Shaiva – who granted Thirumangai a trident as a mark of appreciation.

== Temples ==
In Hampi's Vitthala temple complex, a temple was dedicated to Thirumangai Alvar.

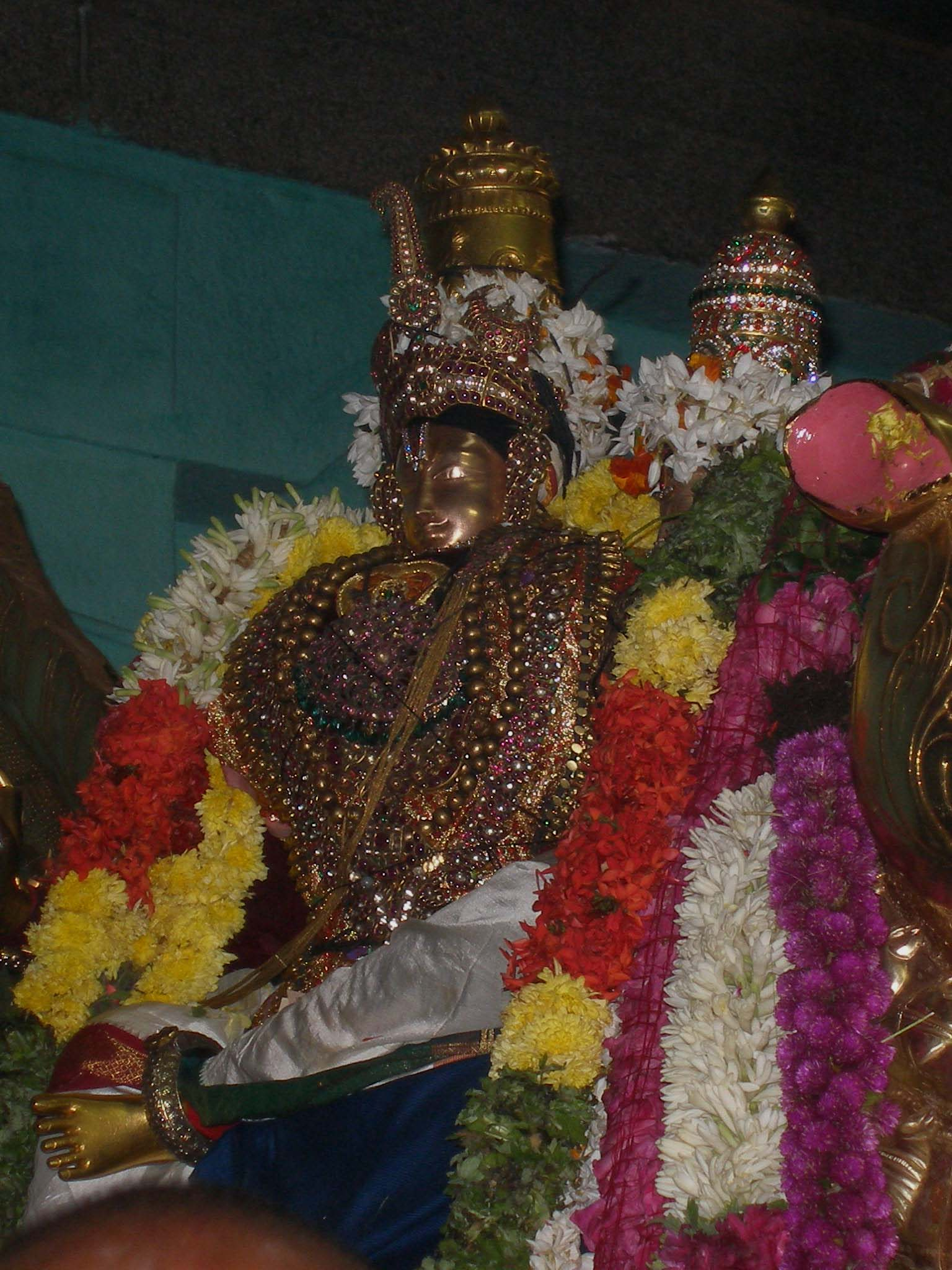
Processional image of Thirumangai Alvar

== Festival ==
The Thirumangai Alvar Mangalasasana utsavam(festival)in the month of Thai(Jan–Feb) witnesses 11 Garudasevai a spectacular event in which festival images idols from the 11 Thirunaangur Divyadesam shrines in the area are brought on Garuda mounts to Thirunangur. An idol of Thirumangai Alvar is also brought here on a Hamsa Vahanam(swan) and his paasurams(verses) dedicated to each of these 11 temples are recited. The Utsavar(festival deity) of Thirumangai Alvar and his consort Sri Kumudavalli Naachiyar are taken in a palanquin to each of the 11 temples, through the paddy fields in the area. The paasurams(poems) dedicated to each of the 11 Divyadesams are chanted in the respective shrines.

== Legacy ==
The Nangur Vishnu Temples are regarded to have been sanctified by him. K. C. Varadachari, author of Alvars of South India describes Thirumangai as:

He was a petty chieftain. He in many respects a dynamic figure, ardent in love, spectacular in his deeds, a rebel and a social reformer, even a kind of Robin Hood, and above all an exquisite lyricist.
