= Tiruvelukkutrirukkai =

Work of Tamil Hindu literature

- ← Periya Tiruvantati Ciriya Tirumatal →
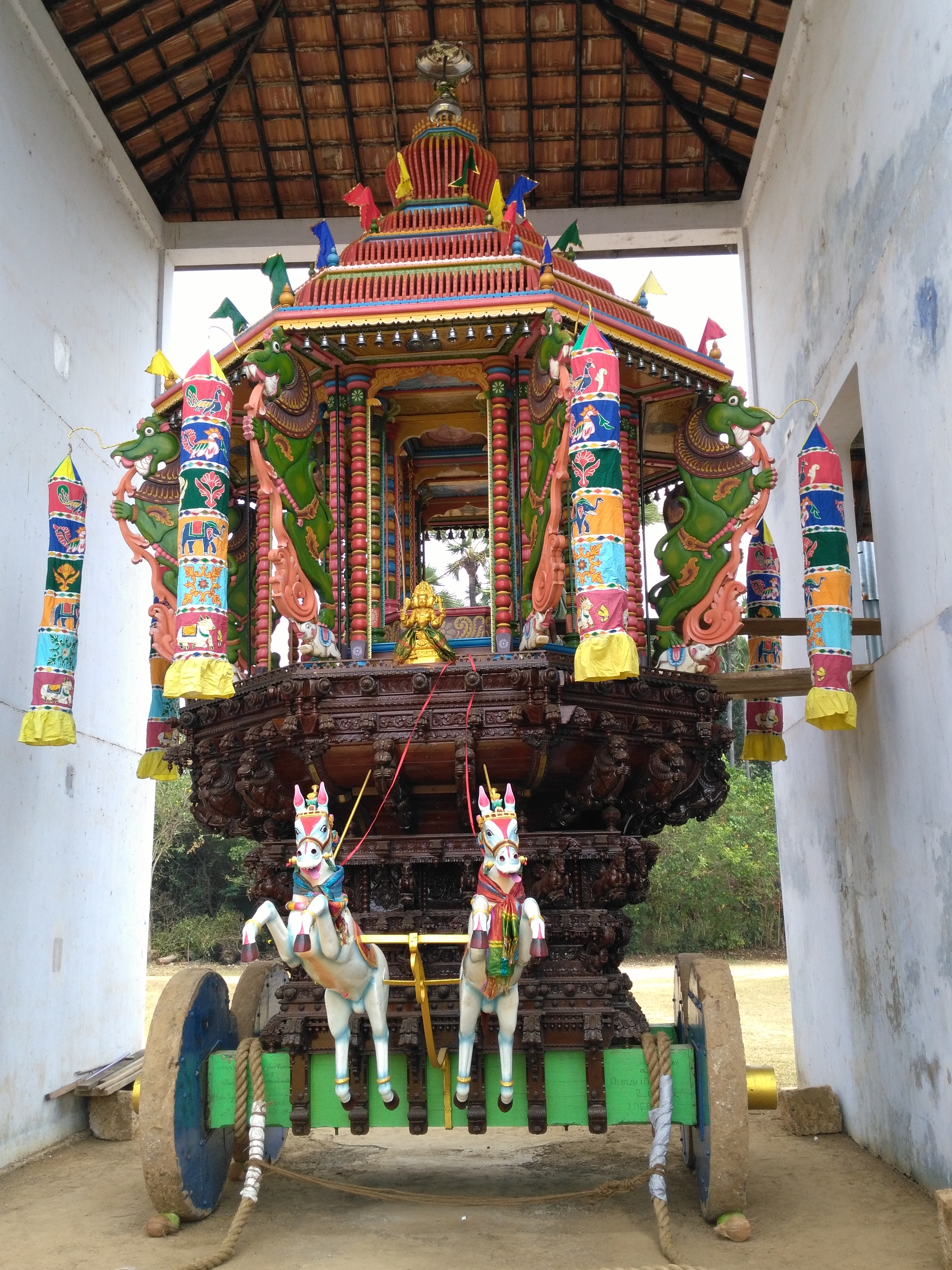
- Image of a ratha.

Information
- Religion: Hinduism
- Author: Tirumangai Alvar
- Language: Tamil
- Period: 9th–10th century CE
- Verses: 1

The Tiruvelukkutrirukkai (Tamil: திருவெழுகூற்றிருக்கை, romanized: Tirueḻukkuṟirukkai, lit. 'Structure of the sacred seven') is a Tamil Hindu work of literature written by Tirumangai Alvar, one of the twelve Alvars of Sri Vaishnavism. Composed of a single hymn, it is part of the compendium of hymns called the Nalayira Divya Prabandham.

== Structure ==
Composed in a poetic style known as the ratha bandham, the structure of this work consists of the inclusion of the Tamil terms of the numbers one to seven throughout the hymn. These numbers are arranged in both an ascending and descending order of frequency within the verses of the work, such that they form both an upright and an inverted pyramid that resemble a Pascal's triangle; the resulting arrangement looks like a ratha, the Sanskrit term for a chariot.

== Hymns ==
Topics in Tamil literature
Sangam Literature
Five Great Epics
Silappatikaram	Manimekalai
Civaka Cintamani	Valayapathi
Kundalakesi
Five Minor Epics
Neelakesi	Culamani
Naga Kumara Kaviyam	Udayana Kumara Kaviyam
Yashodhara Kaviyam
Bhakti Literature
Naalayira Divya Prabandham	Kamba Ramayanam
Tevaram	Tirumurai
Tamil people
Sangam	Sangam landscape
Tamil history from Sangam literature	Ancient Tamil music
Religion in ancient Tamilakam

The verses of the Tiruvelukkutrirukkai are replete with numbers, describing and exalting the attributes of the preserver deity, Vishnu:

O Beautiful four-armed three-cloud-hued lord, with your two feet alone in their one-pointed hearts, the moon-faced two ladies pressing your feet three times all day, as you lie in Yogic sleep; you became the fourfold race of mankind; even the five elements are but you; for the six-legged bee-humming coiffured dame Nappinnai, you fought the seven bulls and destroyed them; you are the six schools of orthodoxy, hard to comprehend. The lotus dame of five auspicious qualities resides on your chest. O Giver of the four-fold fruits, Tri-murti, O Pair of opposites, O Manifold one!

— Tiruvelukkutrirukkai, Verse 1

== See also ==
- Ciriya Tirumatal
- Periya Tiruvantati
- Tiruchanda Viruttam
