= Vellamadam =

- Village
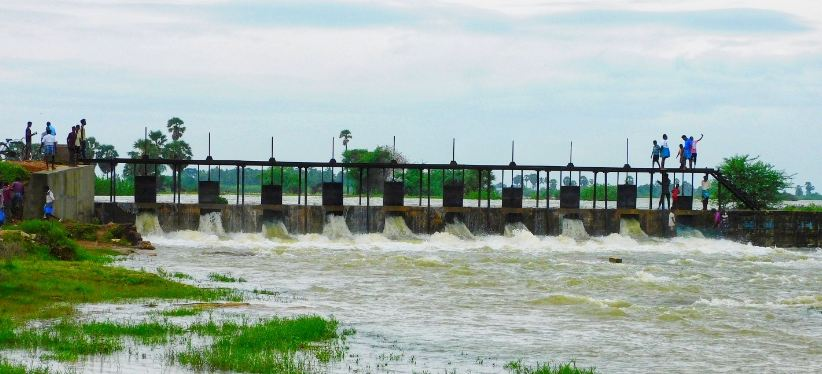
- Image of Sluice gates of the lake in Mela Vellamadam

- Map showing location of Vellamdam in Tamil Nadu
- Coordinates: 8.565733°N 77.943346°E
- Country: India
- State: Tamil Nadu
- District: Thoothukudi
- Taluk: Eral

Population
  - Total: 3,511
- Time zone: UTC+5:30
- PIN: 628 617

Vellamdam is a village in Thoothukudi district in Tamil Nadu. It is situated 4 kilometers away from Nazareth, 32 kilometers away from Tirunelveli and 41 kilometers away from Thoothukudi.

== Geography ==
The village has a big lake which provides water for irrigation. Due to availability of water resources and fertile land, agriculture is widely practiced .Crops such as Paddy, Banana, Ground Nut and Urad dal are cultivated here.

== Administration ==
| Local Body | Vellamadam Panchayat |
| Block | Alwar Thirunagari |
| Taluk | Eral |
| State assembly constituency | Srivaikuntam |
| Lok sabha constituency | Thoothukkudi |
| District | Thoothukudi |

== Transportation ==
=== Road ===
Mela Vellamadam is connected with Nazareth, Theripanai, Chinnamadan Kudiyiruppu and Udaiyarkulam with Other District Roads (O.D.R). Some government town buses and private buses bound to Nazareth, Srivaikuntam, Eral, Salaiputhur, Peikulam and Kayalpatnnam are available from here at fixed timings.

=== Railway ===
The nearest railway stations are Nazareth (4 kilometres) and Alwar Thirunagari (6 kilometres) . Daily passenger trains from Tiruchendur, Thoothukudi and Tirunelveli halt in these stations. The only express train, which halts in Nazareth, is the Chendur Express.

The nearest important railway station is Tirunelveli Junction (35 kilometres).

=== Air ===
The nearest airports are

- Tuticorin Airport ( 28 kilometres )
- Trivandrum international airport ( approximately 160 kilometres ) and
- Madurai Airport ( approximately 170 kilometres)

== Education ==
There is a government-run middle school in the village.

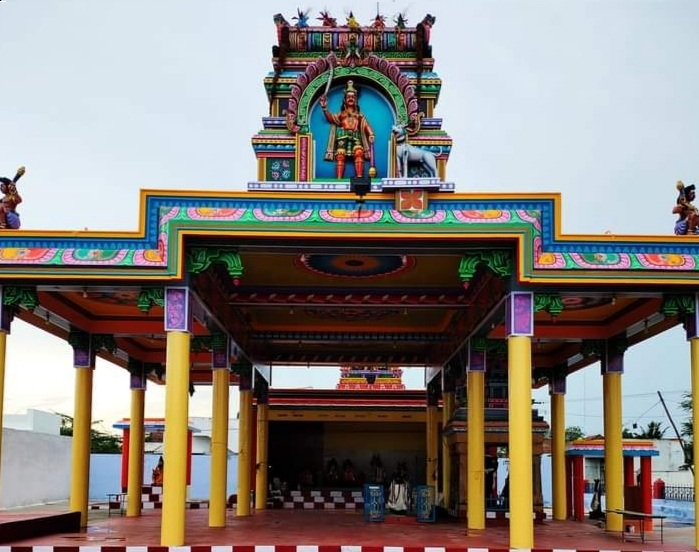
Image of Karuppaswamy Temple in the Village

For higher education purposes, people here depend on higher secondary schools and colleges in Nazareth and other surrounding towns.

== See also ==
- Alwarthirunagari
- Nazareth
- Thirukkolur
