= Vaithamanidhi Perumal Temple =

Perumal temple in Thoothukudi district, Tamil Nadu, India

Sri Vaithamanidhi Perumal Temple
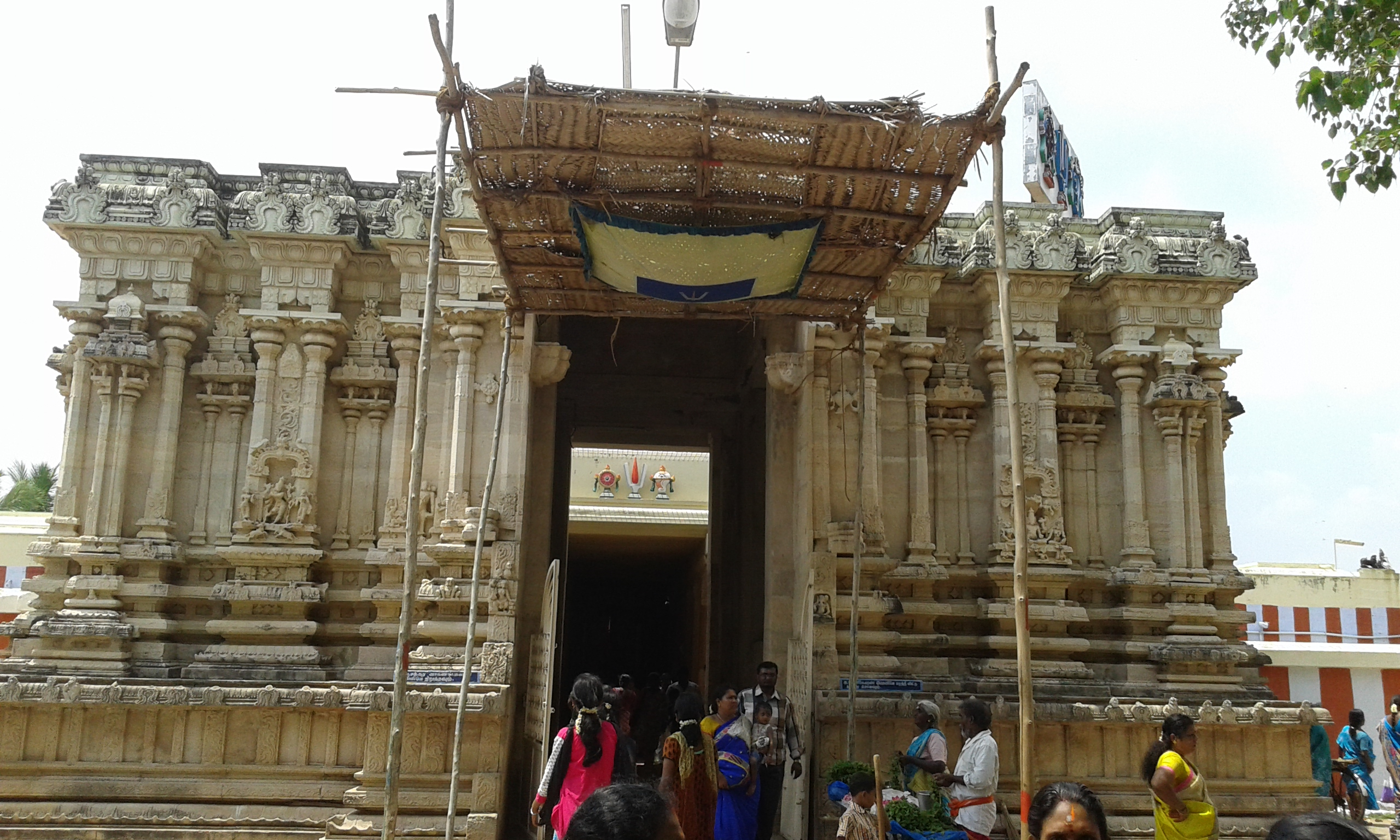

- Location in Tamil Nadu

Religion
- Affiliation: Hinduism
- District: Thoothukudi
- Deity: Vaithamanidhi (Vishnu), Kumudavalli, Kolurvalli (Lakshmi)
- Features: Tower: Srikara; Temple tank: Kubera

Location
- Location: Thirukkolur
- State: Tamil Nadu
- Country: India
- Interactive map of Sri Vaithamanidhi Perumal Temple
- Coordinates: 8°35′48″N 77°57′28″E

Architecture
- Type: Dravidian architecture

Website
- http://navathirupathitemples.tnhrce.in/

Vaithamanidhi Permual Temple (also called Thirukolur) is one of the nine Nava Tirupathi, the Hindu temples dedicated to Vishnu. It is located on the village of Thirukkolur which is located on Thoothukudi district of Tamil Nadu, India. The village is 4 km away from Alwarthirunagari. It is the eighth temple of Nava Tirupathi, and is named after Mars (Sevvai) and also called Kuberasthalam. Constructed in the Dravidian style of architecture, the temple is glorified in the Nalayira Divya Prabandham, the early medieval Tamil canon of the Alvar saints from the 6th–9th centuries CE. It is one of the 108 Divya Desams dedicated to Vishnu, who is worshipped as Vaithamanidhi Perumal and his consort Lakshmi as Kolurvalli.

A granite wall surrounds the temple, enclosing all its shrines. The rajagopuram, the temple's gateway tower, is three-tiered in structure. The temple follows Tenkalai tradition of worship. Six daily rituals and three yearly festivals are held at the temple, of which the ten-day annual Vaikuntha Ekadashi during the Tamil month of Margali (December - January) and Ten day Aavani festival, being the most prominent. The temple is maintained and administered by the Hindu Religious and Endowment Board of the Government of Tamil Nadu.

== Legend ==
According to the temple's regional legend, Kubera, the lord of wealth, was once cursed by Shiva for his lustful glance towards Parvati. Kubera soon realized his mistake and repented for his sin, seeking forgiveness from Shiva and Parvathi. They advised him to perform penance at Thirukkolur. After his penance, Vaithamanithi Perumal blessed him with great wealth again. As per another legend, a king named Ambarisha renounced his crown and became a hermit. He started doing penance in a forest. Sage Durvasa wanted to test his devotion and kicked him. Ambarisha was unmoved which angered Durvasa. He cursed Ambraisa. Ambarisha prayed to Vishnu to help. Pleased by his devotion, Vishnu appeared in the place and relieved him off his curse. Ambarisha built a big temple for Vishnu and called him Ambarisha Varadhar.

== Architecture ==
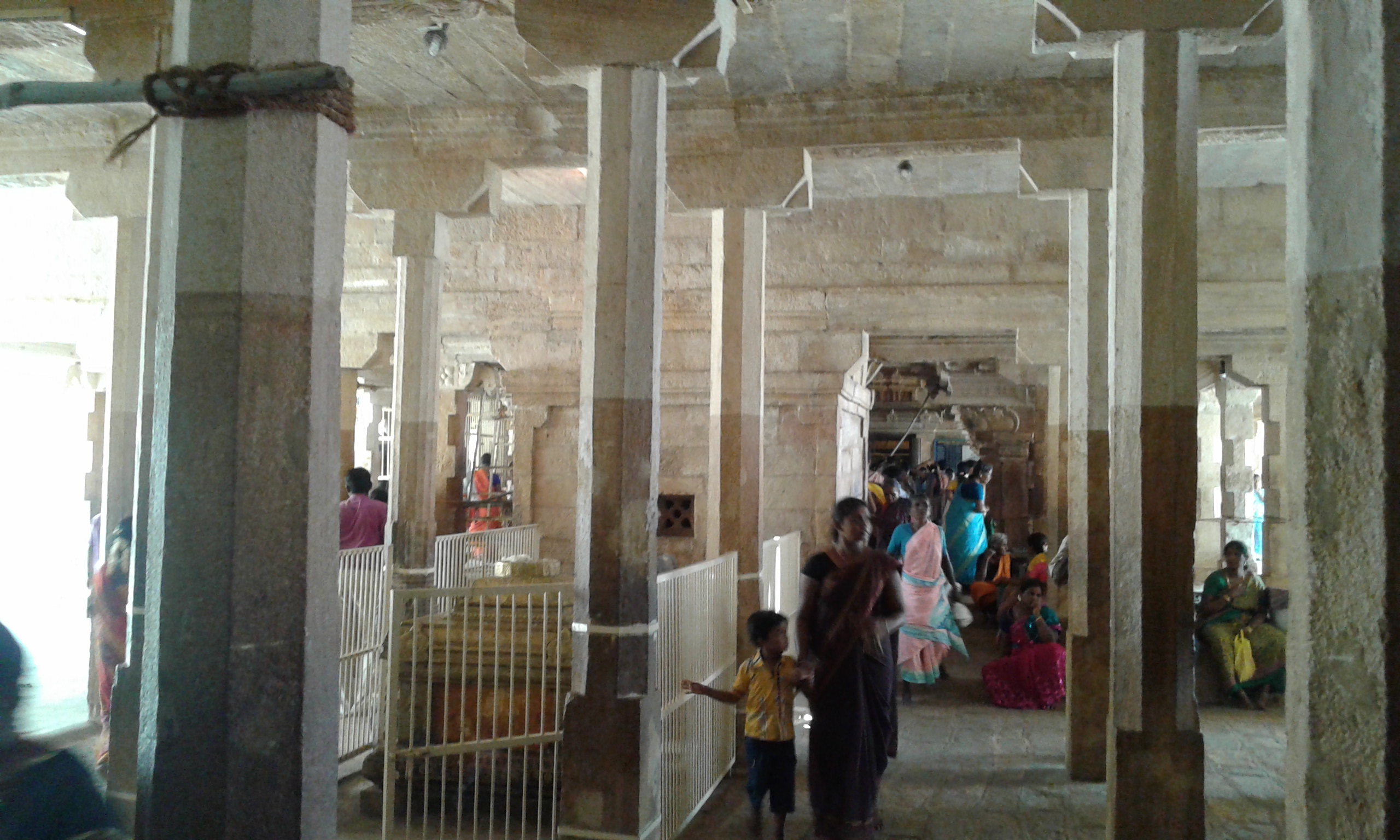
A hall inside the temple

The Temple has two prakaram, or closed precincts. Vaithamanithi Perumal, the main deity, is in a reclining pose facing east. A Marakka is used as his pillow. He is looking at the palm of his left hand to watch over the location of the wealth. It is believed that people who pray here are blessed with great wealth. The original structure is believed to have been refurbished by Rani Mangammal (1689–1704 CE). The temple is located in Tiruchendur-Tirunelveli route, Tamil Nadu, India in the banks of Thamiraparani river, in the South Indian state of Tamil Nadu. The temple is constructed in Dravidian style of architecture. All the shrines of the temple are located in a rectangular granite structure. The temple has an imposing image of Vishnu, a lotus stalk from the navel of the image emanates the image of Brahma. The feet of the deity can be viewed through the passage. The temple has two prakarams (closed precincts of a temple). The images of the festival images are located inside the sanctum.

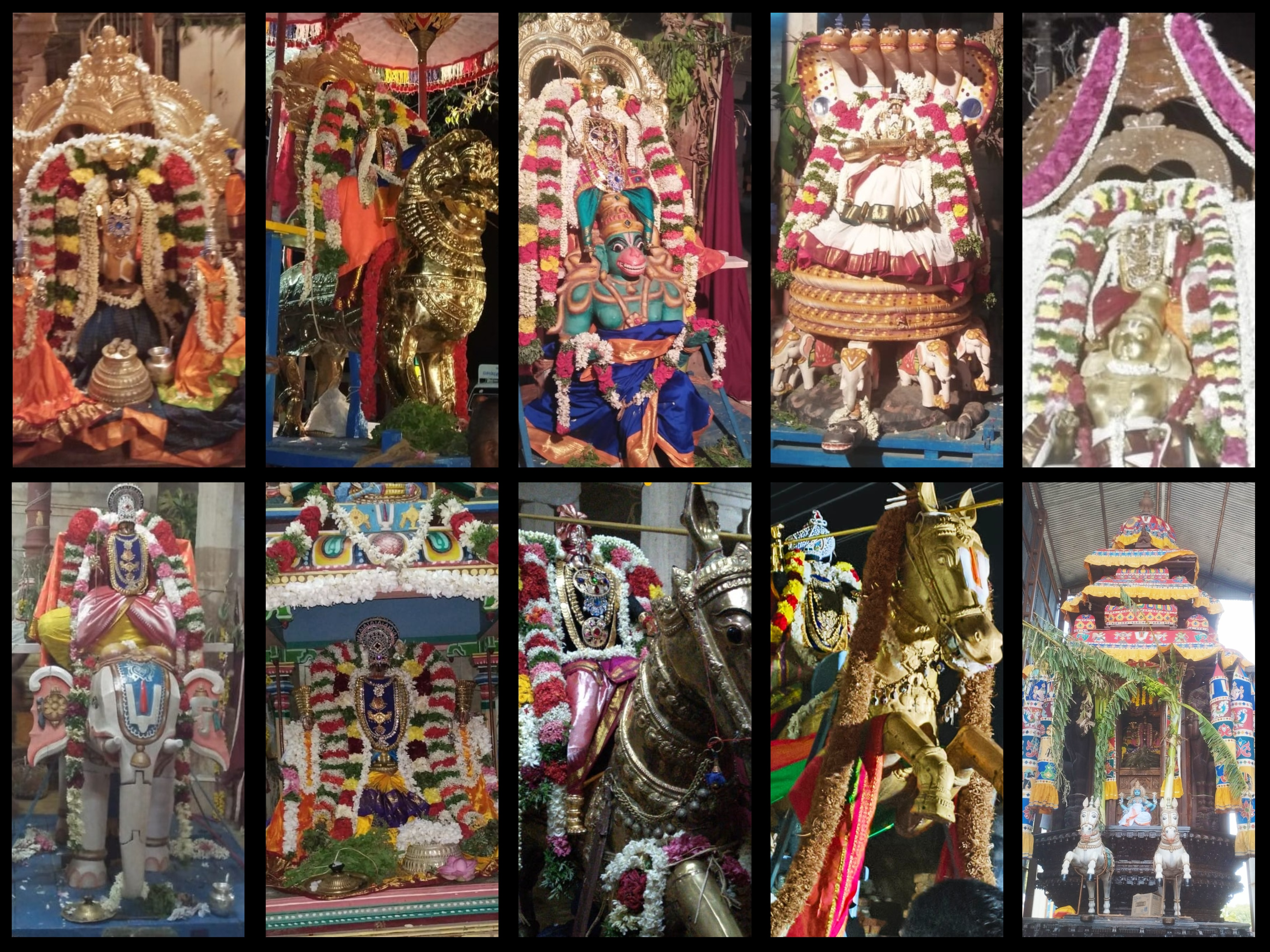
Sri Vaithamanidhi Perumal, Thirukkolur in different vehicles during the annual 10-day Aavani festival

== Festival and religious practices ==
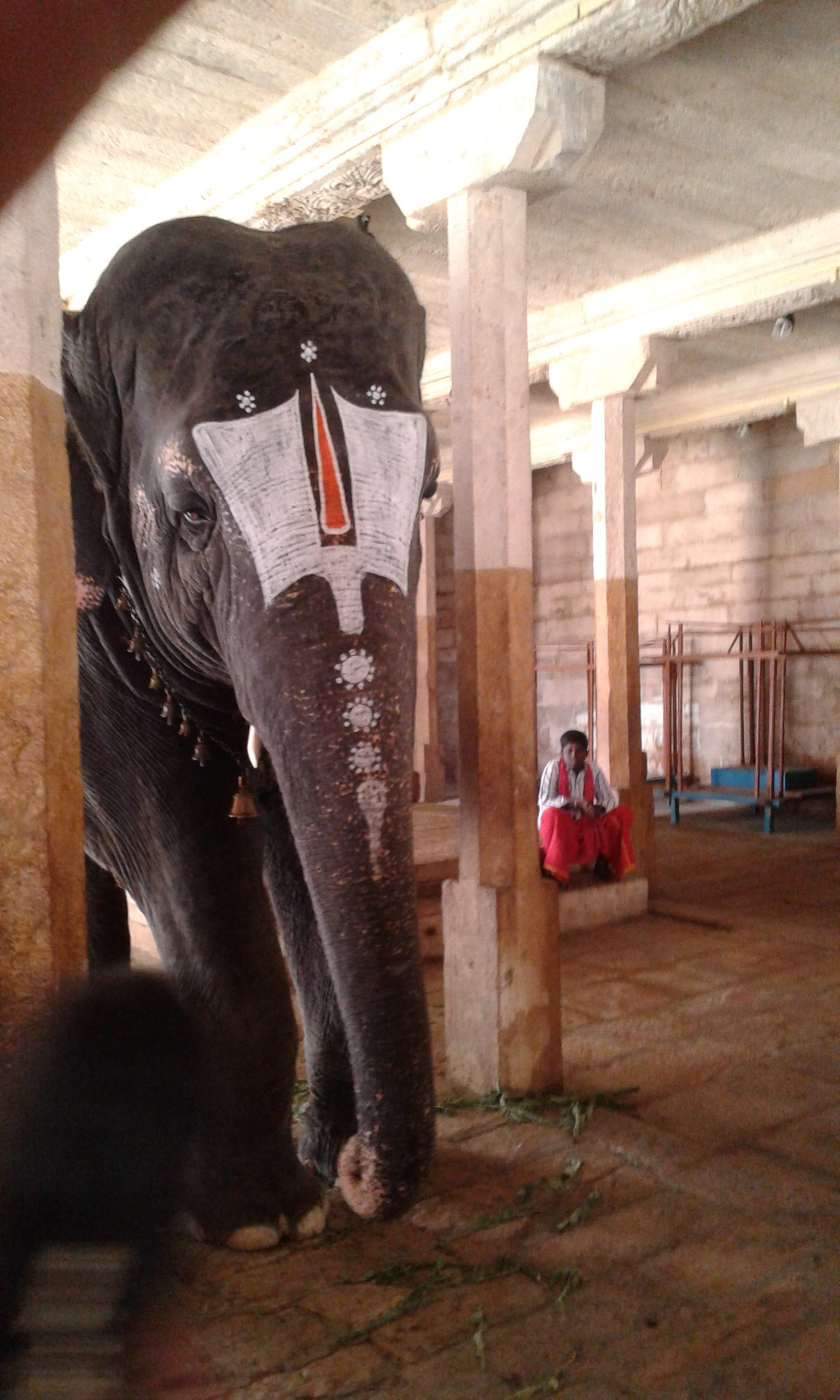
Kumuthavalli in the temple

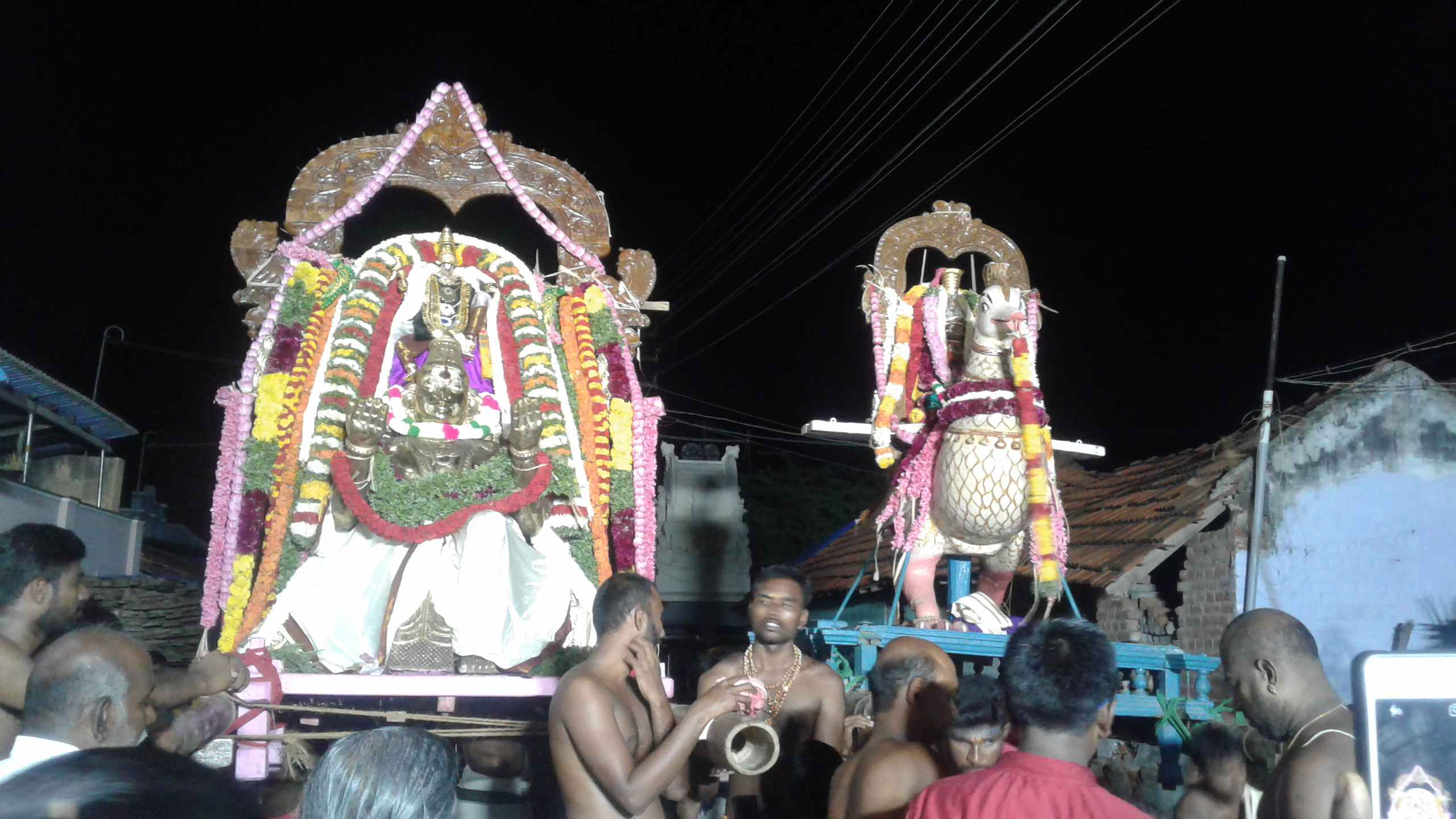
Garuda sevai held annually in month of Purattasi

=== Avani Festival ===
The annual 10 day festival of the temple takes place on the Tamil month of Avani (August–September). During all the 10 days, the deity is taken in different vehicles every day round the temple in the evenings. During the fifth day, an image of Madhurakavi Alvar is also taken in a palanquin (Anna Vahanam) around the village. During the 9th day, an image of Nammalvar from Alwarthirunagari sthaken on a procession to te village and the palanquins of Perumal, Madurakavi Alvar, and Nammalvar are taken round the temple. During the 10th day, the annual chariot festival is celebrated, in which deity is taken round the temple in the temple car.

=== Vaikuntha Ekadashi ===
Pagal Pathu (10 day time) and Ra Pathu (10 night time) festival is celebrated in the month of Margali (December–January) for twenty days. The first ten days are referred as Pagal-Pathu (10-day time festival) and the second half as Ra Pathu (10 day night-time festival). The first day of Ra pathu is Vaikuntha Ekadashi, considered as an auspicious day to worship Vishnu.

=== Purattasi Garudasevai ===
During the Saturdays of Tamil month Purattasi (September/October), the procession of Perumal in Garuda Vahanam and Madhurakavi Alvar in Anna Vahanam go round the temple in evenings.

=== Nammalvar Garuda Sevai ===
During the 5th day of Vaisaki festival of Nammalvar in Alwarthirunagari (May–June, the festival image idols from the Nava Tirupati shrines in the area are brought on a Garuda vahana, a sacred vehicle of Vishnu to the Alwar Thirunagari temple. An idol of Nammalvar is also brought here on an Anna Vahanam (palanquin) and his pasurams (verses) dedicated to each of these nine temples are recited. During this festival, the idols of Vaithamanidhi Perumal and Mathura Kavialvar are also taken to Alwarthirunagari for Garudasevai.

== Religious significance ==
Brahmanda Purana, one of the eighteen sacred texts of Hinduism, and written by Veda Vyasa contains a chapter called Navathirupathi Mahatmeeyam. The first part of the chapter refers to Srivaikuntam. Vaikunta Mahatmeeyam is another work in Sanskrit that glorifies the temple and is a part of Tamraparani Sthalapurana available only in palm manuscripts. The temple is revered in Nalayira Divya Prabandham, the 7th–9th century Vaishnava canon, by Nammalvar. The temple is classified as a Divya Desam, one of the 108 Vishnu temples that are mentioned in the book. The temple is also classified as a Navatirupathi, the nine temples revered by Nammalvar located in the banks of Tamiraparani river. During the 18th and 19th centuries, the temple finds mention in several works like 108 Tirupathi Anthathi by Divya Kavi Pillai Perumal Aiyangar. The temple also forms a series of Navagraha temples where each of the nine planetary deities of one of the temples of Navatirupathi. The temple is associated with the planet Angaraka (Mars). It is the birthplace of Madhurakavi Alvar. Chandra, the moon god, is believed to have been relieved off his curse by his prayers in this place.

The temple follows the traditions of the Tenkalai sect of Vaishnavite tradition and follows Pancharathra aagama. The temple priests perform the pooja (rituals) during festivals and on a daily basis. As at other Vishnu temples of Tamil Nadu, the priests belong to the Vaishnava tradition, from the Brahmin community. The temple rituals are performed six times a day: Kalasanthi at 8:00 a.m., Uchikalam at 12:00 p.m., Sayarakshai at 6:00 p.m., and Ardha Jamam at 8:00 p.m. Each ritual has three steps: alangaram (decoration), neivethanam (food offering) and deepa aradanai (waving of lamps) for both Vaithamanidhi and Kolurvalli. During the last step of worship, nagaswaram (pipe instrument) and tavil (percussion instrument) are played, religious instructions in the Vedas (sacred text) are recited by priests, and worshippers prostrate themselves in front of the temple mast. There are weekly, monthly and fortnightly rituals performed in the temple.
