= Thirukkolur =

- Village
- Thirukkalur
- Map showing Thirukkolur in Tamil Nadu
- Coordinates: 8.594°N 77.957°E
- Country: India
- State: Tamil Nadu
- District: Thoothukudi
- Taluk: Eral
- Named for: Vaithamanidhi Perumal Temple

Population (2011)
  - Total: 3,141
- Time zone: UTC+5:30
- PIN: 628 612

Thirukkolur (or Thirukalur ) is a village in Thoothukudi district in Tamil Nadu. The village is the location of the Sri Vaithamanidhi Perumal Temple.

It is situated 3 kilometres away from Alwarthirunagari. The village is approximately 30 kilometres away from Tirunelveli and approximately 35 kilometres away from Thoothukudi. The coordinates of Thirukkolur are 8.5949° N, 77.9582° E.

== Etymology ==
According to a Hindu legend, Kubera, the lord of wealth, was once cursed by Shiva for his lustful glance towards Parvati.Kubera soon realized his mistake and repented for his sin, seeking forgiveness from Shiva and Parvathi. They advised him to perform penance at Thirukkolur. After his penance, Vaithamanithi Perumal blessed him with great wealth again. Since it is the place (Tamil : ஊர்) where Kubera got (Tamil : கோள் - கொள்ளுதல்) his wealth (Tamil : திரு - செல்வம்), the name of this town was Thirukkolaur

Thiru (திரு) + Kol (கோள்) + Oor (ஊர்) = Thirukkolur (திருக்கோளூர்)

== Geography ==
The village is located near to the banks of Thamirabarani river. The South Canal of Srivaikuntam dam passes through this village.

== Agriculture ==
Due to availability of water resources and fertile land, agriculture is widely practiced. Crops such as Paddy, Urad dal, Groundnut, and Banana are cultivated.

== Administration ==
Local Body	Thirukkolur Panchayat
Block	Alwar Thirunagari
Taluk	Eral
State assembly constituency	Srivaikuntam
Lok sabha constituency	Thoothukkudi
District	Thoothukudi

== Religious places ==
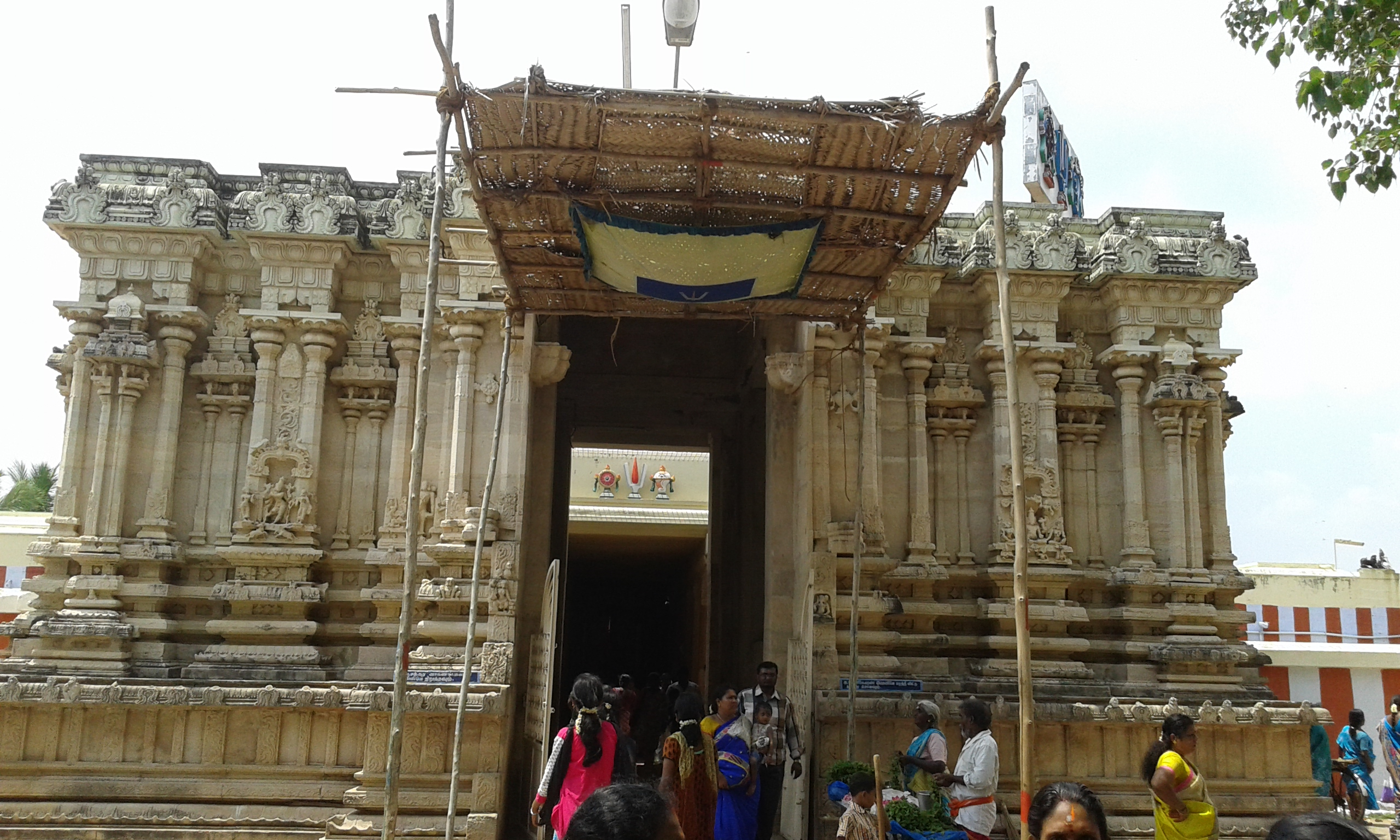
Sri Vaithamanidhi Perumal Temple, Thirukkolur

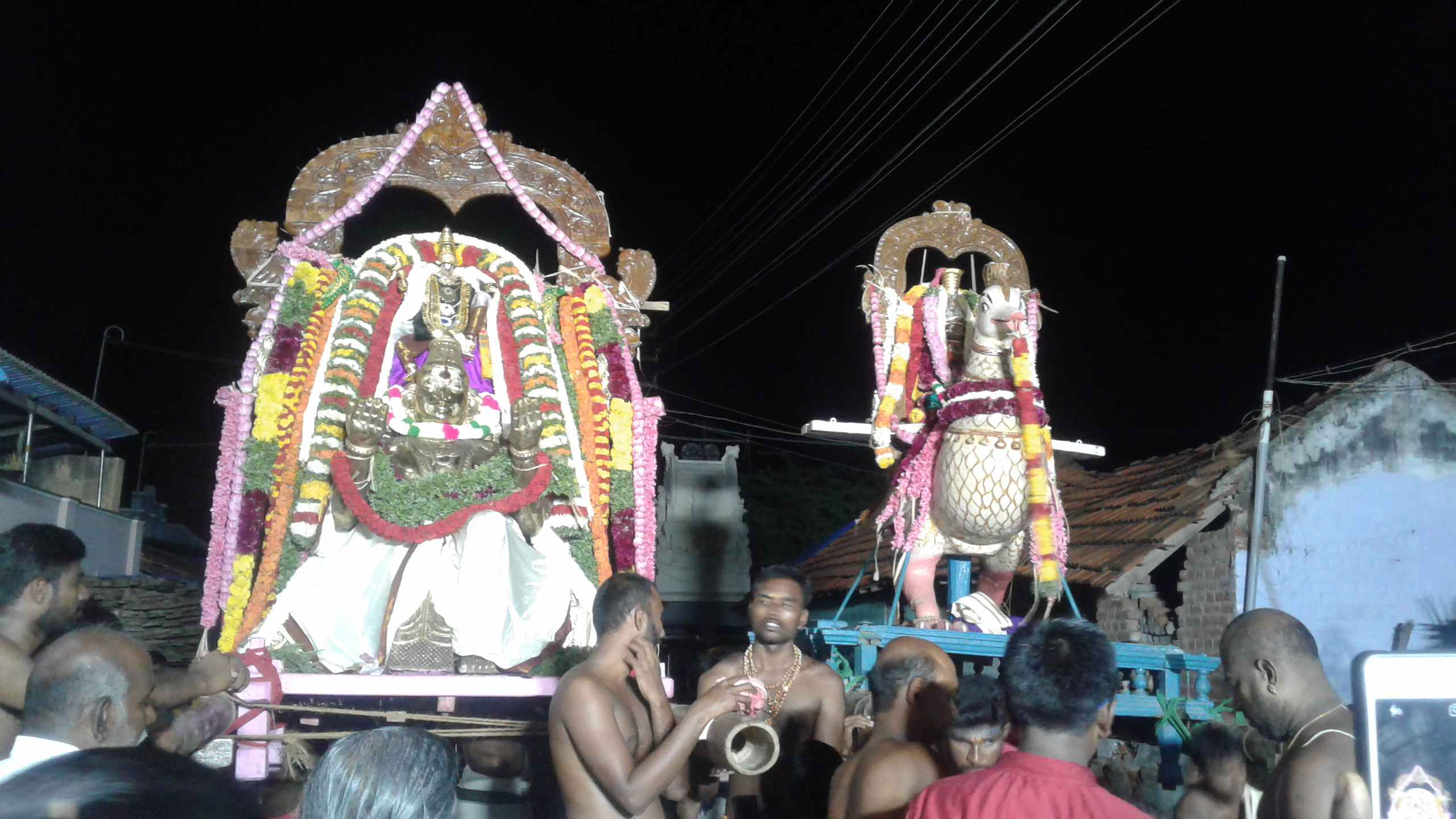
Garuda Sevai (religious procession) in Thirukkolur during Saturdays of Purattasi Month. Vaithamanidhi Perumal (Left) and Madurakavi Alwar ( Right)

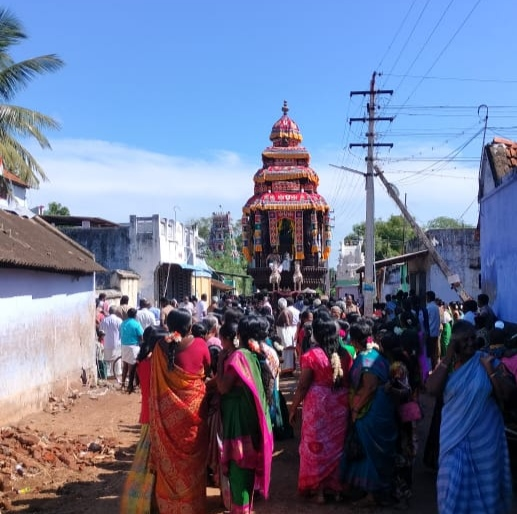
Annual Car festival in Vaithamanithi Perumal Temple

Vaithamanidhi Perumal Temple is one among 108 Divya Desams and 9 Nava Tirupathis. The deity of the temple is Sri Vaithamanidhi Perumal (Vishnu). The deity is in reclining pose.

== Madhurakavi Alwar ==
Thirukkolur is the birthplace of Madurakavi Alwar, who is one among 12 Alwars. Madurakavi Alwar was a disciple of Nammalvar

== Excavations ==
The central government has given permission to carry out excavations at 5 places near Adichanallur including Thirukkolur to find the habitats of the ancient people. On 5 February 2023, Archeological Survey of India commenced excavation near Chera Chola Pandeeswarar Temple at Thirukkolur. Later, the archaeologists said that they are planning to expand the excavation and the excavation work will continue for one year.

== Transportation ==
=== Road ===
There is a main road which passes through Thirukkolur. This road starts from Maanattur in SH- 93 ( Alwar Thirunagari - Valliyur Highway) and ends at Palkulam Vilakku in SH - 40 ( Sengottai - Tiruchendur highway ).

=== Railway ===
The nearest railway stations are Alwar Thirunagari (3 kilometres) and Nazareth (6 kilometres). Daily passenger trains from Tiruchendur, Thoothukudi and Tirunelveli halt in these stations. The only express train, which halts in Nazareth, is the Chendur Express.

The nearest important railway station is Tirunelveli Junction (35 kilometres).

=== Air ===
The nearest airports are

- Tuticorin Airport ( 25 kilometres )
- Trivandrum international airport ( approximately 170 kilometres ) and
- Madurai Airport ( approximately 170 kilometres)

== See also ==
- Vaithamanidhi Perumal Temple
- Alwarthirunagari
- Mela Vellamadam
