= Araiyar Sevai =

Tamil Hindu artform

Araiyar Sevai (Tamil: அரையர் சேவை, romanized: araiyarcēvai, lit. 'service of the cantors') is a Tamil Hindu performing art form, centered on the ritual singing and enactment of the hymns of the Divya Prabandham, the canon of the Sri Vaishnava tradition. Araiyar Sevai is generally performed only inside Vaishnavite temples in the presence of the temple utsavar — the temple's processional deity — by hereditary male performers called Araiyars. Although temple inscriptions suggest its performance was once widespread, it is today only performed in few temples in Tamil Nadu: the temple shrine of Srirangam, shrine of Azhagiya Manavala Perumal Temple, the shrine of Alvar Tirunagari and the temple of Andal at Srivilliputhur. It is also performed in a different form at the Melkote temple in southern Karnataka, where the hymns of the Divya Prabhandham is sung, but not enacted.

== Origin legends ==
Performing legends trace the origin of the Araiyar Sevai to Nathamuni, a 10th-century Vaishnavite teacher, who according to tradition compiled the Divya Prabandham. According to the legends, Nathamuni composed musical tunes (icaippa) for the hymns along with dance steps to bring out their meaning. He instituted three annual festivals, called tiruvattiyayanam for the performance of the hymns. These include the festivals of Pongal, Panguni Uttiram, and Adi Puram.

== The performers: Araiyars ==
The art form is practiced principally by a few families of hereditary performers, called araiyars. An araiyar is attached to a temple as a priest and conducts certain prayers throughout the year, but only performs the araiyar sevai during the tiruvattiyāyaṉam festivals instituted by Nathamuni. Araiyars are male and must spend several years studying the hymns of the Divya Prabandham and the traditional commentaries on the hymns, particularly the commentary known as īṭu by Vaṭakku Tiruvītippiḷḷai, in addition to studying the art form itself. The araiyars are regarded to represent the lovelorn milkmaids seeking union with their divine lover, Krishna.

== Performance ==
The traditional clothes worn during araiyar sevai performances are the pañcakacam (a style of wearing the veshti) and a conical hat called araiyar kullai, which bears the Vaishnavite symbols of the conch, discus, and tirunamam. During the actual performance, a piece of cloth taken from a garment used by the temple deity is tied to the hat. The araiyar wears a garland and holds cymbals which he plays during the performance.

An araiyar sevai begins with a ritual summons, where the officiating priest using a ritual formula, calls upon the araiyar to come before the temple utsavar — the temple's processional deity. The araiyar replies with a formulaic response and puts on the araiyar kullai as he approaches. He then sounds a few strokes on the cymbals and begins the performance.

Each verse is performed in three steps. In the first, the araiyar sings the verse. In the second, he dances a few steps which, through a system of ritualised gestures, give expression to the literal meaning of the verse. In the third step, he explains the inner meaning of the verse, as explained in Tampirāṉ paṭi, a traditional commentary on the Divya Prabandham. On specific days, the performance of individual verses is followed by a dramatisation of specific scenes from Hindu mythology, such as the churning of the ocean, the birth of Andal, or the slaying of Kamsa. The final element of the performance is the mutukkuri vaipavam, which depicts a worried mother consulting a kattuvicci female soothsayer about her daughter, who is lovelorn.

== Notable performers ==
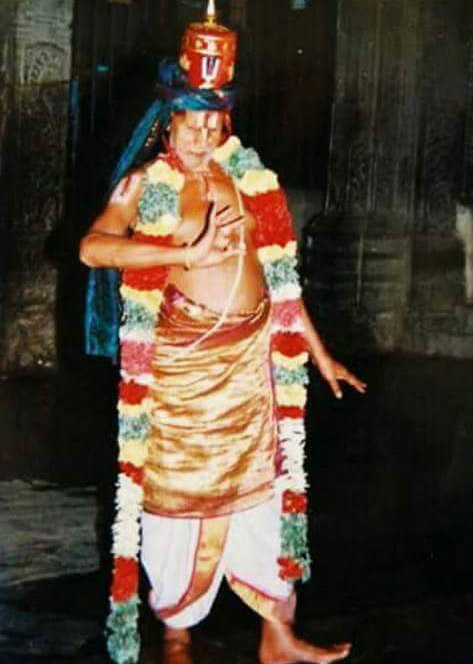
Srinivasa Rengachariar, the Araiyar Swami of Andal Temple at Srivilliputhur, Tamil Nadu, India

Srinivasa Rengachariar (1930 - 2014) was a leading exponent of Araiyar Sevai at the temple of Andal at Srivilliputhur. Born in Srivilliputhur on Pooram day in the Tamil month of Purattasi in 1930, Araiyar Srinivasa Rengachariyar, a descendant of Melaiyagath Alvar, was initiated into this special art of presenting the sacred verses by his father Araiyar Vadapatrasayee at the age of seven. Since then, till the time of his death in 2014, he has performed the Araiyar Sevai in various Vaishnavite shrines including that of Andal at Srivilliputhur, Nambi in Thirukkurungudi, Badrinath Temple, Alwarthirunagari Temple, etc. In 2014, he was posthumously conferred the prestigious Sangeet Natak Akademi Award for his services to the art form. He is now survived by his son, Araiyar Balamukundachariyar and grandson Srinivasa Rengan, who perform the Araiyar Sevai today.

In recent years, some Vaishnavites have attempted to broaden the range of temples in which Araiyar Sevai is performed and to teach it to non-hereditary performers in order to arrest its decline. Srirama Bharati is a noted proponent of a new enacted and sung form of Araiyar Sevai, which is a revivalist, modern form with no hereditary connection to traditional Araiyar Sevai performed at the Sri Vaishnava shrines.

== See also ==
- Dance forms of Tamil Nadu
- Ancient Tamil music
