= Kanninun Cirutampu =

Tamil Hindu work of literature

- ← Amalanatipiran Periya Tirumoli →
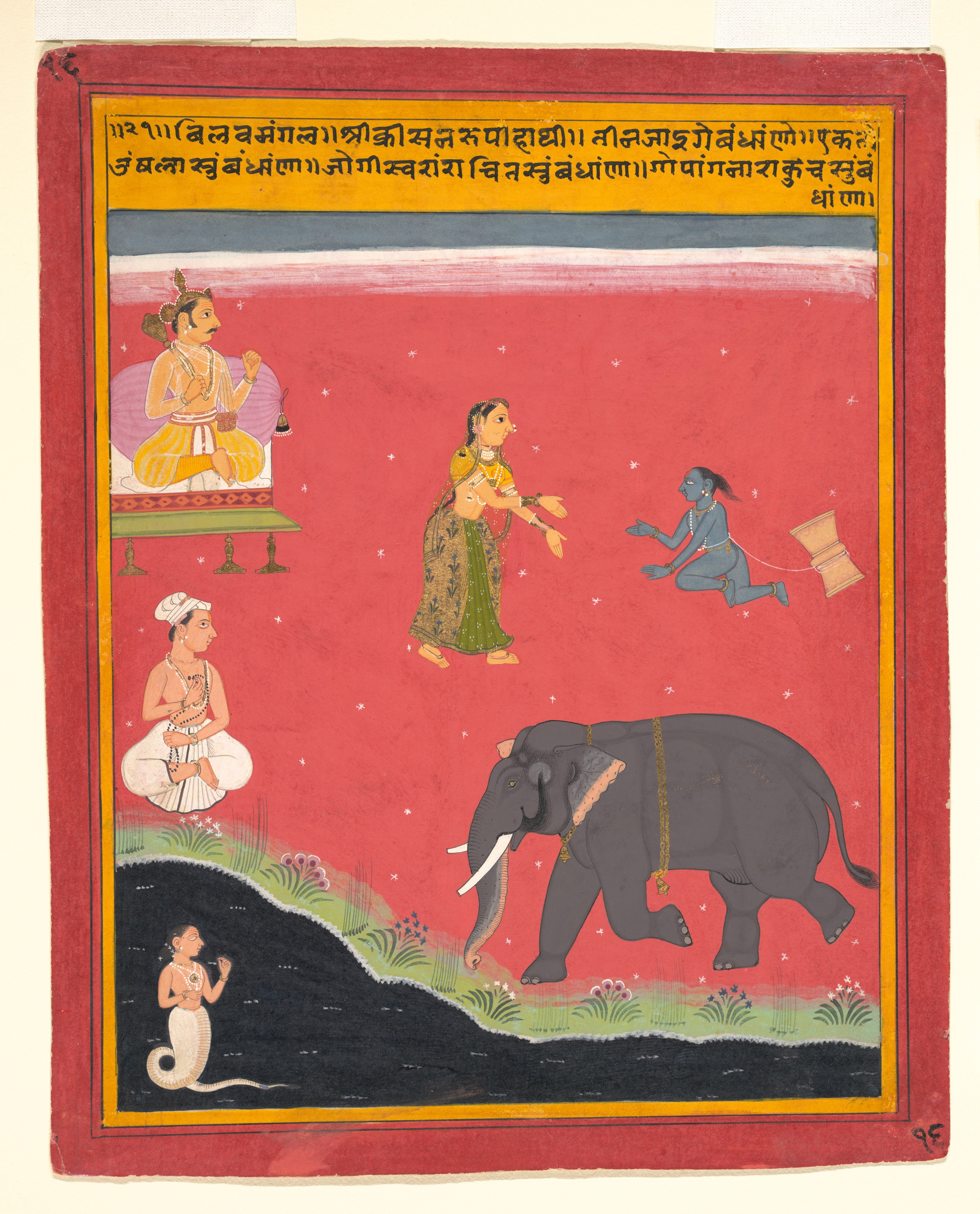
- Painting of Krishna tied to a mortar. Page from a Bilvamangalastava, Metropolitan Museum of Art.

Information
- Religion: Hinduism
- Author: Madhurakavi Alvar
- Language: Tamil
- Period: 9th–10th century CE
- Verses: 11

A recital of the Kanninun Cirutampu.

The Kanninun Cirutampu (Tamil: கண்ணிநுண் சிறுத்தாம்பு, romanized: Kaṇṇinuṇ Ciṟutāmpu, lit. 'a rope of small knots'), also rendered as the Kanninun Siruttambu, is a work of Tamil Hindu literature composed by Madhurakavi Alvar, one of the twelve Alvars (the poet-saints) of the Sri Vaishnava tradition. Comprising eleven pasurams (hymns), the Kanninun Cirutampu is a tribute to Madhurakavi Alvar's acharya, Nammalvar. These hymns form part of the Sri Vaishnava canon, the Nalayira Divya Prabandham. The work praises both Alwarthirunagari Perumal Temple (Thirukkurugur) and its presiding deity, Adinathar Perumal, whose dark-hued image remains in the Alvar's mind as he sings of his acharya.

== Legend ==
Topics in Tamil literature
Sangam Literature
Five Great Epics
Silappatikaram	Manimekalai
Civaka Cintamani	Valayapathi
Kundalakesi
Five Minor Epics
Neelakesi	Culamani
Naga Kumara Kaviyam	Udayana Kumara Kaviyam
Yashodhara Kaviyam
Bhakti Literature
Naalayira Divya Prabandham	Kamba Ramayanam
Tevaram	Tirumurai
Tamil people
Sangam	Sangam landscape
Tamil history from Sangam literature	Ancient Tamil music
Religion in ancient Tamilakam

The Kanninun Cirutampu is associated with the recovery of the Nalayira Divya Prabandham. According to legend, the theologian Nathamuni once heard devotees reciting the eleven pasurams opening with Āravāmude from Nammalvar's Tiruvaymoli at Sarangapani Temple at Kumbakonam. The final hymn referenced Āyirattul Ippattu (lit. '10 out of the 1000'); Impressed by these pasurams (hymns) and intrigued by the implied existence of an additional 990 hymns, Nathamuni sought to locate the complete collection. When he inquired about the remaining 990 hymns, the reciters were unfamiliar with them. As the hymn mentioned the author's name and hometown (Kurukur Satakopan), Nathamuni traveled to Kurugur to search for Nammalvar's 1,000 hymns.^{[8]}

The local residents were unfamiliar with the 1,000 hymns, but they informed him of the eleven pasurams (hymns) composed by Nammalvar's disciple, Madhurakavi Alvar, known as the Kanninun Cirutampu. They asked him to stand before Tiruppulialvar, the sacred tamarind tree under which Nammalvar had meditated, and recite these eleven pasurams 12,000 times. Nathamuni followed their advice; pleased by his devotion, Nammalvar revealed to him not only his own 1,000 pasurams, but the entire 4,000 pasuram compendium of all twelve Alvars.^{[9]}

== Hymns ==
The work is named after the first two words of its opening hymn. The title functions as a metaphor comparing the rope used by Yashoda to bind the infant Krishna to the poet's devotion to his acharya, Nammalvar. In the work, Madhurakavi Alvar praises Nammalvar as the lord of Kurugur, his birthplace.

The opening hymn is translated as follows:

In place of my father, the great marvellous one
who had himself tied with the knotted, slender cord,
I now draw near and speak of the lord of southern Kurkukur,
and it flows as amrtam, my tongue's delight

— Kanninun Cirutampu, Hymn 1

== See also ==
- Periyalvar Tirumoli
- Tiruchanda Viruttam
- Nachiyar Tirumoli
