= Nammalvar =

Hindu poet-saint

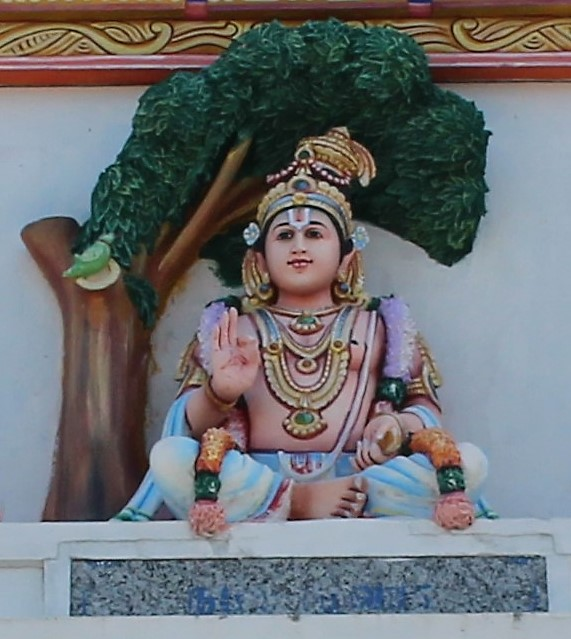
- Stucco image of Nammalvar in Kalamegha Perumal temple

Personal life
- Born: śaṭhakopa 8 century CE Alwarthirunagiri, Tamil Nadu
- Notable work(s): Tiruviruttam; Tiruvaciriyam; Periya Tiruvantati; Tiruvaymoli

Religious life
- Religion: Hinduism
- Philosophy: Sri Vaishnavism, Bhakti

Nammalvar was one of the twelve Alvar saints of Tamil Nadu, India, recognized for their contributions to the Vaishnava tradition of Hinduism. The hymns of the Alvars are compiled as the Naalayira Divya Prabandham, which praises 108 temples classified as divine abodes, known as the Divya Desams. Nammalvar is traditionally counted as the fifth among the twelve Alvars. He is regarded as a central mystic of Sri Vaishnavism. Widely considered the foremost of the Alvars, he composed 1,352 of the 4,000 hymns in the Naalayira Divya Prabandham.

According to traditional accounts, Nammalvar was born in 3059 BCE in Alwarthirunagiri. Historically, scholars date him to the eighth century CE. According to legend, Nammalvar remained silent from birth and sat beneath a tamarind tree. The poet-saint Madhurakavi Alvar, followed a bright light shining in the south until he found the child sitting beneath the tree, where Nammalvar spoke his first words.

The works of Nammalvar were compiled by Madhurakavi as four different works: the Tiruvaymoli (1,102 verses), Tiruviruttam (100 verses), Tiruvaciriyam (or Tiru Asiriyam – 7 verses) and Periya Tiruvantati (87 verses). The works of Nammalvar contributed to the philosophical and theological ideas of Vaishnavism.

The Garudasevai festival in Nava Tirupati, the nine Vishnu temples in the Thoothukudi region, and the Araiyar Sevai during the Vaikuntha Ekadashi festival of the Srirangam temple are dedicated to him. The verses of Nammalvar and other Alvars are recited as a part of daily prayers and during festive occasions in several Vaishnava temples in Tamil Nadu.

== Alvars ==
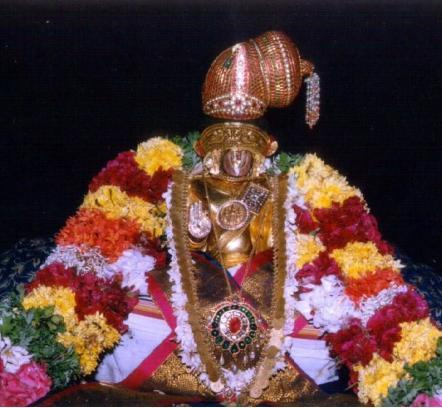
Festive image of Nammalvar

The word alvar means the one who dives deep into the ocean of the countless attributes of god. The Alvars are considered the twelve supreme devotees of Vishnu who were instrumental in popularising Vaishnavism. The religious works of these saints in Tamil, songs of love and devotion, are compiled as Nalayira Divya Prabandham containing 4000 verses and the 108 temples revered in their songs are classified as Divya Desam. The saints had different origins and belonged to different castes. As per history, the first three alvars, Poigai Alvar, Bhoothath Alvar and Pey Alvar were born miraculously. Thirumalisai Alvar was the son of a sage, Thondaradippodi Alvar, Madhurakavi Alvar, Periyalvar and Andal were from the Brahmin community, Kulashekhara Alvar was a kshatriya, Nammalvar was a Vellala, Thiruppaan Alvar was a paanar and Thirumangai Alvar was a kallar. The Divya Suri Charitra by Garuda-Vahana Pandita (11th century), Guruparamparaprabhavam by Pinbaragiya Perumal Jiyar, Periya tiru mudi adaivu by Anbillai Kandadiappan, Yatindra Pranava Prabavam by Pillai Lokacharya, commentaries on Divya Prabandam, Guru Parampara (lineage of Gurus) texts, temple records and inscriptions give a detailed account of the alvars and their works. According to these texts, the saints were considered incarnations of some form of Vishnu. Poigai is considered an incarnation of Panchajanya (Krishna's conch), Bhoothath of Kaumodakee (Vishnu's Mace/Club), Pey of Nandaka (Vishnu's sword), Thirumalisai of Sudarshanam (Vishnu's discus), Namm of Vishvaksena (Vishnu's commander), Madhurakavi of Vainatheya (Vishnu's eagle, Garuda), Kulasekhara of Kaustubha (Vishnu's necklace), Periya of Garuda (Vishnu's eagle), Andal of Bhoodevi (Vishnu's wife, Lakshmi, in her form as Bhudevi), Thondaradippodi of Vanamaalai (Vishnu's garland), Thiruppaan of Srivatsa (An auspicious mark on Vishnu's chest) and Thirumangai of Sharanga, Rama's bow. The songs of Prabandam are regularly sung in all the Vishnu temples of South India daily and also during festivals.

According to a traditional account by Manavala Mamunigal, the first three alvars, namely Poigai, Bhoothath and Pey, belong to the Dvapara Yuga (before 4200 BCE). It is widely accepted by tradition and historians that the trio are the earliest among the twelve alvars. The alvars were also instrumental in promoting the Bhagavatha cult and the two epics of India, the Ramayana and the Mahabharata. The alvars were instrumental in spreading Vaishnavism throughout the region. The verses of the various alvars were compiled by Nathamuni (824-924 CE), a 10th-century Vaishnava theologian, who called it the "Tamil Veda".

Sri nammalvar-Subbiah kumara valai

== Early life ==
According to traditional scriptures, Nammalvar was born on the 43rd Kali in 3059 BCE as an amsha of Vishvaksena, Vishnu's army commander. He was born into a Vellalar clan at Thirukurukur (modern day Alwarthirunagiri) in the southernmost region of the Tamil country.

Tradition says that he must have been born fully enlightened because as a baby he never cried or suckled and never opened his eyes. According to legend, as a child he responded to no external stimuli and his parents left him at the feet of the deity of Sri Adhinathar in Alwarthirunagari. The child then got up and climbed into a hole in a tamarind, sat in the lotus position, and began to meditate. It appears he was in this state for as long as sixteen years when a Tamil poet and scholar named Madhurakavi Alvar was born in Thirukolur (who was elder to him by age) and had travelled to North India on a temple trip. As he was performing his Nityaanushtanam (daily rituals) one day, he saw a bright light shining to the south, and followed it until he reached the tree where the boy was residing. Unable to elicit any reaction from the child, he asked him a riddle: "If the small is born in a dead's body (or stomach), what will it eat and where will it stay?" meaning, if the subtle soul is embodied in the gross body, what are its actions and thoughts? Nammalvar broke his lifelong silence and responded, "That it will eat, it will rest!" meaning that if the soul identifies with the body, it will be the body but if it serves the divine, it will stay in Vaikuntha and eat (think) of God. Madhurakavi Alvar realized the divinity of this child.

It is believed that in the Kali Yuga, the doors of Vaikuntham (The abode Of Vishnu) was opened first time for him by Narayana himself and it is believed that the followers of Swami Nammalvar have the most easy access to the supreme abode. Following his moksha his family entitle as the Subbiah Kumara Pillai by holy Vaishnava acharyas and they serve him and believe him to be Sriman Narayana Tiruvadi. After the passing of Nammalvar, Madhurakavi Alvar composed 10 pasrams called Kanninin Sirutambu. He gave a word that whoever reads this 11,000 times with devotion will get vision and blessings of Nammalvar whenever they visit his abode at Alvarthirunagari.

Nammalvar was one of the twelve alvar poet-saints who immersed themselves in a love of Vishnu and who had a considerable knowledge of ancient Tamil literature and its variants of traditional stories concerning Vishnu and his associates, as well as the philosophical differences between Buddhism, Hinduism and Jainism.

Madhurakavi Alvar was his first disciple. Swami Madhurakavi Alvar composed 11 pasurams in praise of his Acharya, Swami Nammalvar known as Kanninun Sirutampu, which are included among the Nalayira Divya Prabandham.

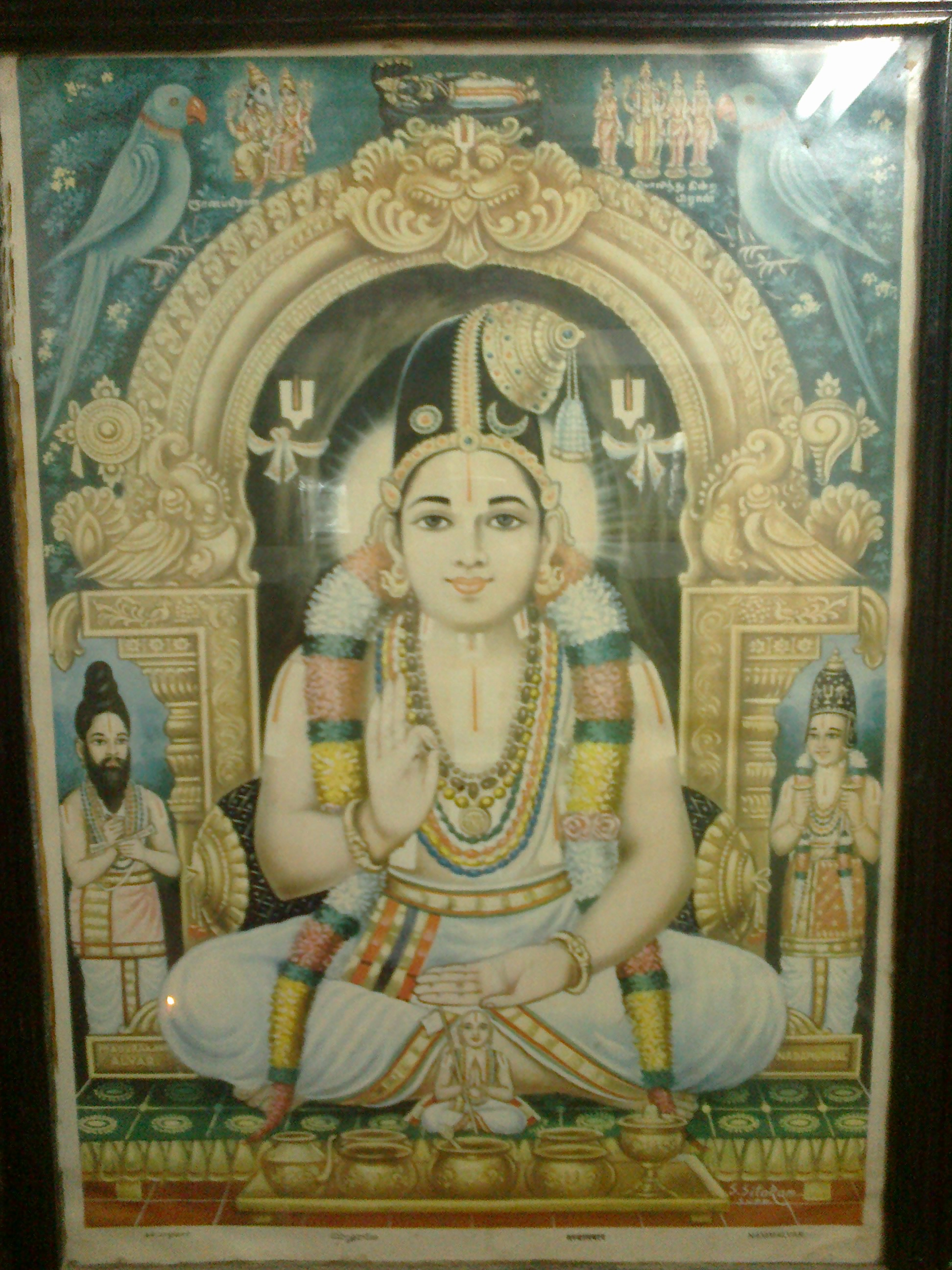
Swami Nammalvar with Madhurakavi Alvar and Nathamunigal

== Work ==
He contributed four pieces of works to Divya Prabhandham. These works consisted of 1,296 poems, making him the most prolific contributor to the 4,000 hymns written by the Alvar poet-saints. These works are:

- Tiruvaymoli (1102 verses)
- Tiruviruttam (100 verses)
- Tiruvaciriyam (7 verses)
- Periya Tiruvantati (87 verses)

Tiruvaymoli describes Ranganatha as a metaphor for discussing the philosophical details in

- The nature of the paramatma (divine soul)
- The nature of the jeevatma (living soul)
- The means for the jeevatma (living soul) to attain the goal of Paramatma (divine soul)
- The blocks and hurdles on the way and
- The goal moksha (divinity).

In the Sri Vaishnava canon, these four represent (in Tamil language) the four Sanskrit vedas, respectively, the Sama Veda, Rig Veda, Yajur Veda and Atharva Veda. According to tradition "He poured the cream of these vedas" into his songs and poetry that were the result of deep mystic experience. Though Nammalvar did not visit any of the 108 divyadesam temples talked about in the Vaishnava religion, it appears from his works he must have had the vision of all the archa forms in the temples he glorified in his hymns.

== Style of composition ==
The distinction of Nammalvar with his contemporaries is above the devotional aspects in writing, the visualization and dramatic movement. He mentions Vishnu in various aspects frequently in all his verses. The poems of Tiruvirrutam are depicted fully between the lone context of the hero and heroine. Most of these are utterances of the hero, heroine, her friends to the heroine or her mother to the heroine. The heroine always perceives her hero, Vishnu everywhere around her. As per Varadachari, Tiruviruttam is "an account of the pilgrimage of the soul to its transcendence over its ignorance, sleep and sloth in which it is caught up in the body". While medieval poetry is considered self-pity and repentance, his works always have a message of hope.

== Significance ==
Nammalvar is regarded as one of the top three Hindu mystics in India, with the other two being Manickavasagar and Kabir. Nammalvar is considered greatest among the twelve alvars and his contributions amount to 1352 among the 4000 stanzas in the Nalayira Divya Prabandam.

The Garuda Sevai utsavam (festival) in the month of Vaikasi (May-Jun) witnesses nine Garudasevai, an event in which festival image deities from the nava tirupathis temples namely, Mayakoothar Temple, Makara Nedunkuzhai Kannan Temple, Rettai Tirupathi - South Temple, Rettai Tirupathi North Temple, Vaithamanidhi Perumal Temple, Adhinaatha Perumal Temple - Thirukkurugur, Kaaisinavendhan Temple, Vijayaasana Perumal Temple, Sri Vaikuntanatha (Kallapiran) Temple are brought on Garuda vahana. The festival image of Nammalvar is also brought in Anna Vahanam (palanquin) and his verses dedicated to each of these nine temples are recited. The utsavar of deities of each of the nine temples, travel through the paddy fields in the area, reach Alvar Thirunagari. The verses dedicated to each of the nine Divyadesams are chanted with music and dance in front of respective utsavar deities. It is the most important of the festivals in this area, and it draws thousands of visitors.After this paasuram recital is completed, the Alvar utsavar in anna vahanam and the nine Perumal deities in Garuda Vahanam come around the maada veethi [temple street] of Alvar Thirunagari. Then, each divyadesam Perumal utsavar bid farewell to their most relished jeevathma Nammalvar and return to their respective temples. Amongst these Perumals, when Alvar most favourite deities of Irattai tirupathi leave after the utsavam, Alvar is saddened by their departure and will wait until they take a turn to their divyadesams. This episode of the Garuda Sevai is known as "Vidaiyaatri Utsavam". The saddened Alvar is taken into the temple by Alvar Thirunagari's deity Polindhu Nindra Piran by showing his beauty. This garuda sevai is to show how Alvar has sung paasurams on each perumal without moving an inch from his Thirupuliyazhwar. All the Perumals come to the Holy Tamarind tree to get sung by the Alvar.

Devotees during Vaikunta Ekadasi
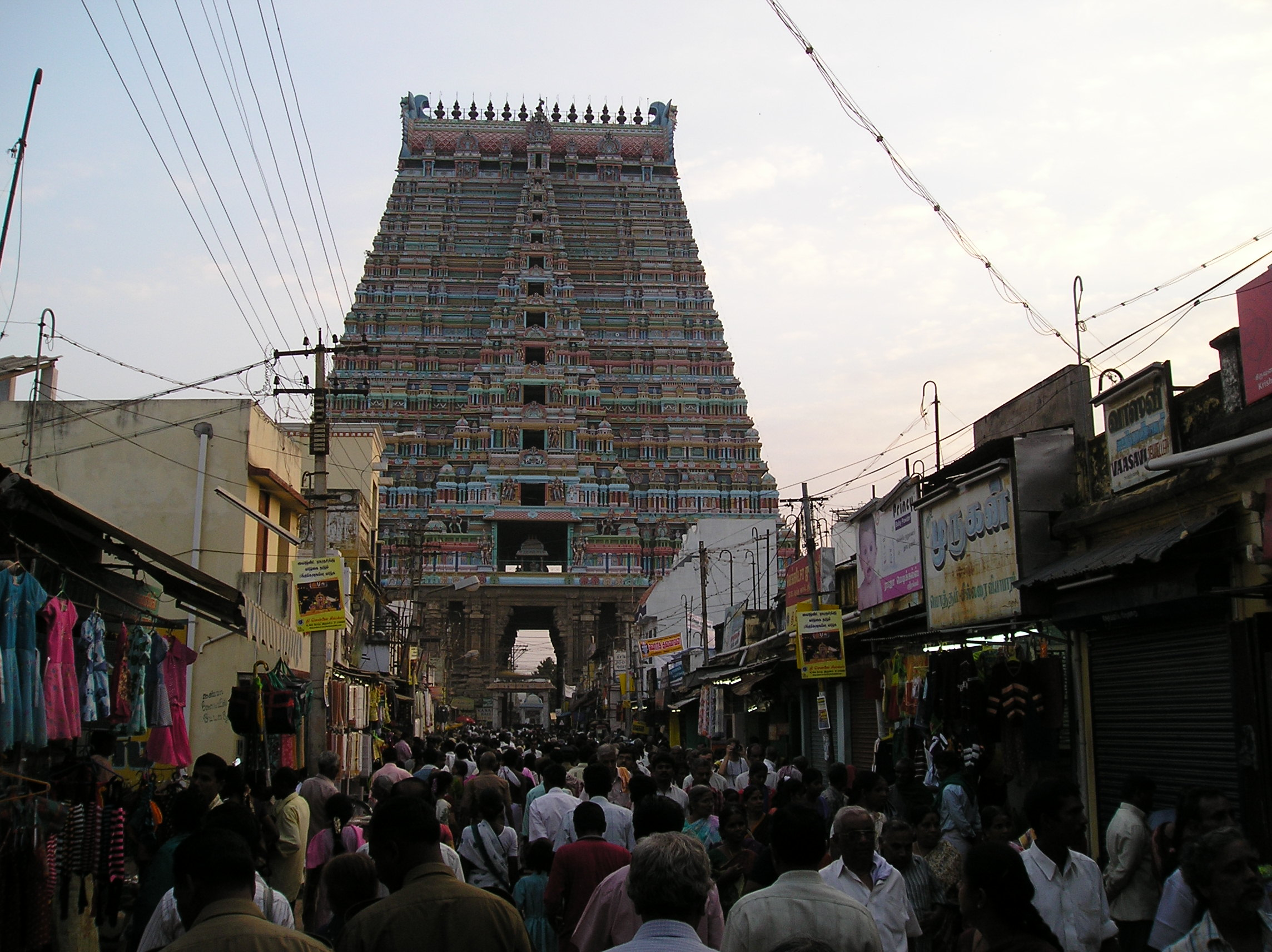
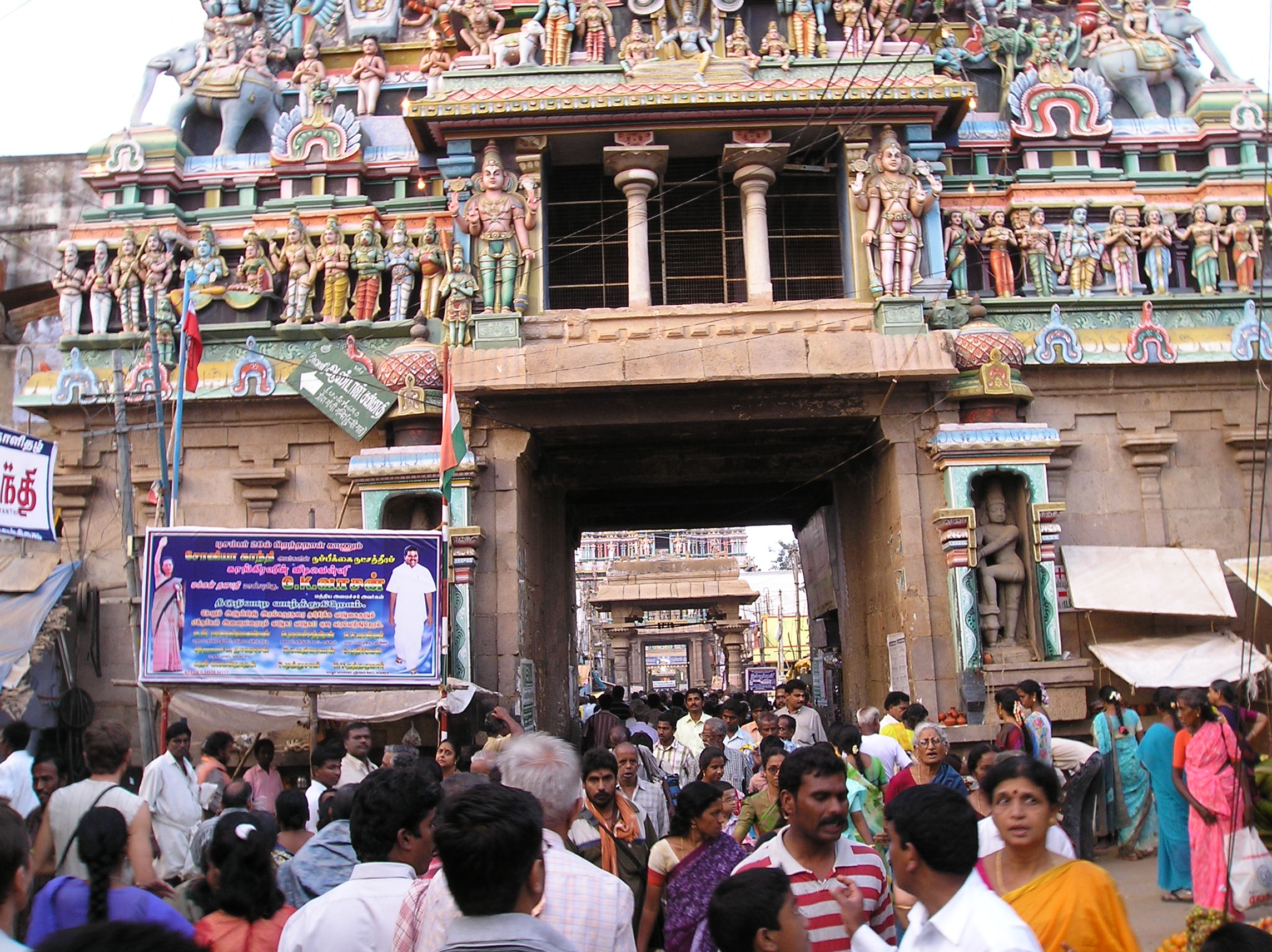

The Pagal Pathu and Ra Pathu festivals are celebrated in the month of Margazhi (December–January) for twenty days in Sri Ranganathaswamy Temple, Srirangam. The first ten days are referred to as Pagal-Pathu (10-day daytime festival) and the second half as Ra Pathu(10-day nighttime festival). The first day of Ra pathu is Vaikunta Ekadashi. The eleventh day of each fortnight in the Tamil calendar is called Ekadasi and the holiest of all Ekadasi in the Vaishnava tradition is the Vaikunta Ekadashi. Nammalvar, one of the 12 alvars, is believed to have ascended to Vaikuntha (the heavenly abode of Vishnu) on this day. The devotion of the 9th-century poet, Nammalvar, and his perceived ascent to heaven are enacted annually. During the festival, through song and dance, this place is affirmed to be Bhoologa Vaikunta (heaven on earth). Araiyar Sevai is a divine colloquium of araiyars, who recite and enact Nalayara Divya Prabanda, the 4000 verses of alvars (Vaishnavite poets of the 7th–10th century). Araiyars are born to the Araiyar tradition most prevalent in Sri Vaishnava families in Srirangam, Alvar Thirunagari and Srivilliputhur. The tradition of Araiyar Sevai was started by Nathamuni, a 10th-century Vaishnavite who compiled the works of alvars. It is believed as per Hindu mythology that 330 million demi-gods came down to witness the event. The festival deity is brought to the 1,000-pillared hall on the morning of Vaikunta Ekadashi through the Paramapada Vasal (gate to paradise). Hundreds of thousands of pilgrims rush to enter it after the gate is opened and the deity passes through it as it is believed that one who enters here will reach Vaikuntha (heaven) after death. The gate is open only during the ten days of Ra Pathu (10 days of the nighttime festival). On the last day of the festival, the poet Nammalvar is said to be given salvation. The performance is enacted by priests and images in the temple depicts Nammalvar as reaching heaven and getting liberation from the cycle of life and death. At that point, a member from the crowd of devotees, who are witnessing this passion play, goes up to the centre stage and requests Vishnu to return Nammalvar to humanity, so that his words and form in the temple will continue to inspire and save the devotees. Following this performance of the salvation of Nammalvar, the cantors are taken in procession around the temple.

== See also ==
- Ramanuja
- Nathamuni
- Vedanta Desika
- Manavala Mamunigal
- Mudaliyandan
- Hindu reform movements
