= Periya Tiruvantati =

Work of Tamil Hindu literature

- ← Tiruvaciriyam Tiruvelukkutrirukkai →
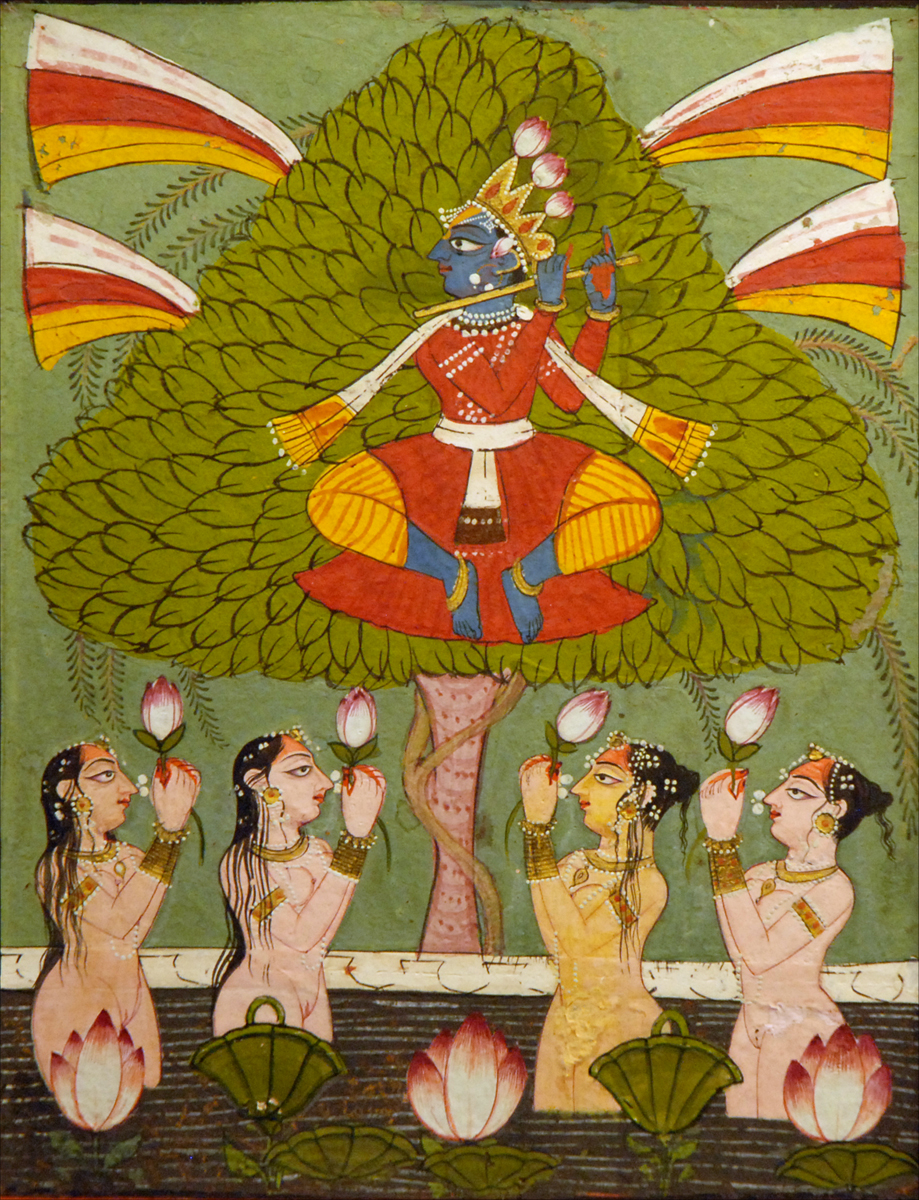
- Painting of Krishna among the milkmaids of Vraja, the gopis. Museum of Oriental Art, Rome.

Information
- Religion: Hinduism
- Author: Nammalvar
- Language: Tamil
- Period: 9th–10th century CE
- Verses: 87

The Periya Tiruvantati (Tamil: பெரிய திருவந்தாதி, romanized: Periya Tiruvantāti, lit. 'The great sacred verse') is a compilation of hymns written by Nammalvar, one of the Alvars, the poet-saints of the Sri Vaishnava tradition. This work, which is a part of the Nalayira Divya Prabandham, consists of eighty-seven hymns referred to as pasurams, dedicated to the praise of the Hindu preserver deity, Vishnu. It is often regarded to contain the essence of the Atharvaveda.

== Hymns ==
The hymns of the Periya Tiruvantati are written in the poetic style called the antati, in which a new verse is linked with the last word of the preceding verse.

There are two theories that seek to explain the name of this text, both of which are drawn from hymns within the work. In the fifty-sixth hymn of the Periya Tiruvantati, Nammalvar asserts his belief that the performance of prapatti alone is enough to receive the protection of the deity Krishna. This is interpreted to be the essence of the charama shlokam, an ontological hymn, which is regarded to be of such significance that the antati was henceforth deemed to be great. In the seventy-fifth hymn of this work, Nammalvar engages in a theological conversation with Vishnu, where he acknowledges his attributes. As a metaphor of devotion, he states that he had deftly captured the deity in his heart, a deity who had captured the entire world. Thus, he rhetorically wonders who among the two of them was greater, lending this question to the name of the text.

The forty-ninth hymn of the Periya Tiruvantati describes Nammalvar's perception of Krishna:

Whenever I see the dark clouds, or the dark mountains, or the deep ocean, or the dark night, or the bee-humming Kaya flower, or anything else of dark hue, my heart leaves me and flies out, saying, “This is Krishna’s glorious form"

— Periya Tiruvantati, Hymn 49

== See also ==
Topics in Tamil literature
Sangam Literature
Five Great Epics
Silappatikaram	Manimekalai
Civaka Cintamani	Valayapathi
Kundalakesi
Five Minor Epics
Neelakesi	Culamani
Naga Kumara Kaviyam	Udayana Kumara Kaviyam
Yashodhara Kaviyam
Bhakti Literature
Naalayira Divya Prabandham	Kamba Ramayanam
Tevaram	Tirumurai
Tamil people
Sangam	Sangam landscape
Tamil history from Sangam literature	Ancient Tamil music
Religion in ancient Tamilakam

- Tiruviruttam
- Tiruvaciriyam
- Nachiyar Tirumoli
