= Tiruvaciriyam =

Work of Tamil Hindu literature

- ← Tiruviruttam Periya Tiruvantati →
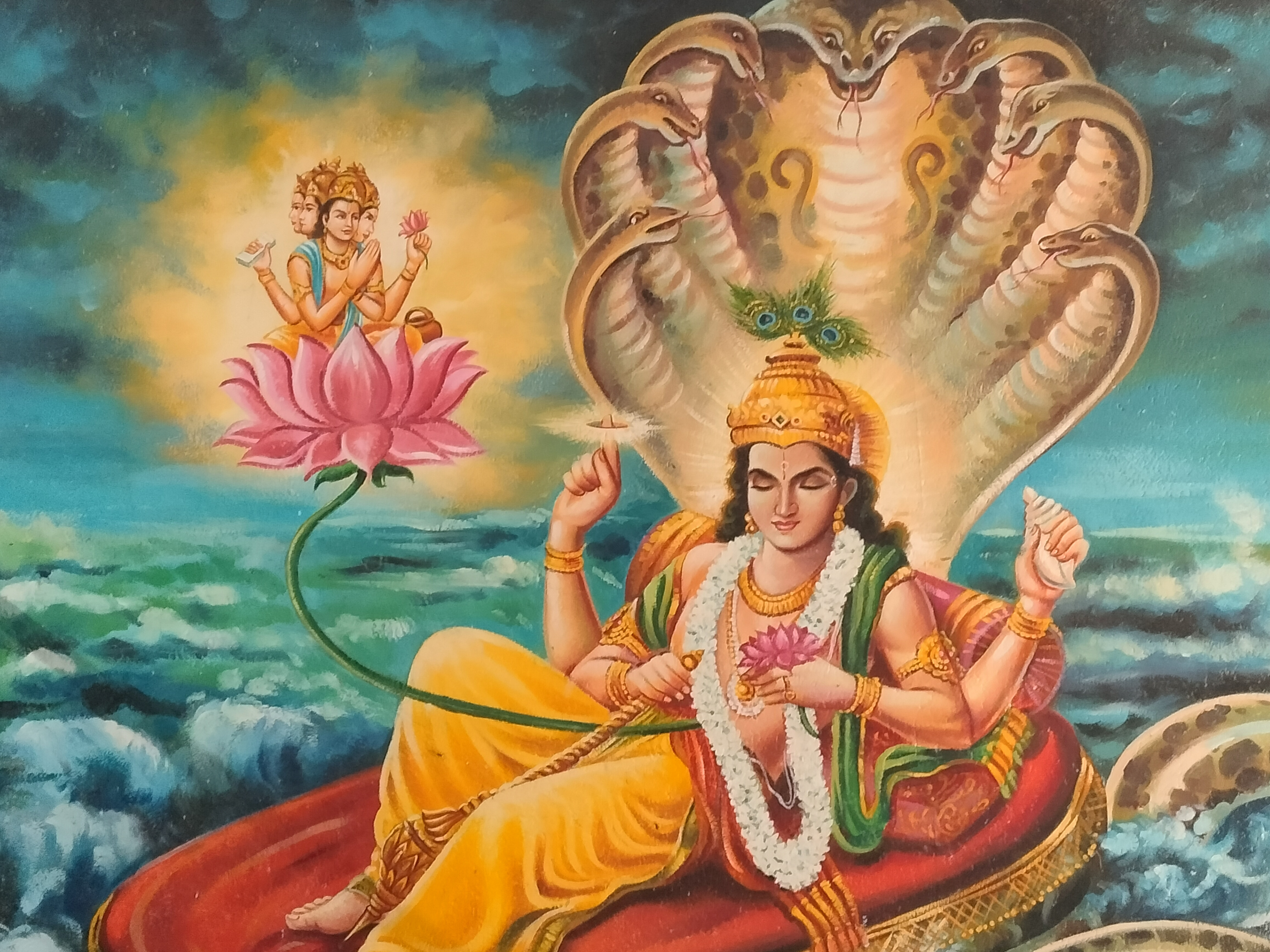
- Painting of Vishnu upon Shesha, Sri Appan Venkatachalapati Temple, Cheranmahadevi.

Information
- Religion: Hinduism
- Author: Nammalvar
- Language: Tamil
- Period: 9th–10th century CE
- Verses: 7

The Tiruvaciriyam (Tamil: திருவாசிரியம், romanized: Tiruvaciriyam, lit. 'Sacred meter') is a compilation of hymns written by Nammalvar, one of the Alvars, the poet-saints of the Sri Vaishnava tradition. This work, which is a part of the Nalayira Divya Prabandham, consists of seven hymns referred to as pasurams, dedicated to the praise of the Hindu preserver deity, Vishnu. It is often regarded to contain the essence of the Yajurveda.

== Hymns ==
The first hymn of the work describes Vishnu reclining upon his serpent-mount, Shesha, extolled as a deity without equal:

O Lord with lotus-red feet that strode the Earth! Wearing the red clouds as vestments, the radiant Sun as a diadem, the pleasing Moon on your person, and stars spangled all over, with red coral lips, and green-radiance spreading emerald mountains, you lie in the arms of the sea-lord, seeming like one asleep
Wearing a yellow vestment, a crown, and many golden jewels, the red of your eyes and lips glowing, the green of your body overpowering the red, in the middle of the Ocean of Milk, on a serpent with many hoods,
You recline in deep sleep where all the gods led by Siva, Brahma, and Indra stand and offer worship. O Lord without a peer or superior, with a lotus on your navel!

— Tiruvaciriyam, Hymn 1

== See also ==
- Tirumālai
- Periya Tirumoli
- Tiruvaymoli
