= Nathamuni =

Hindu theologian

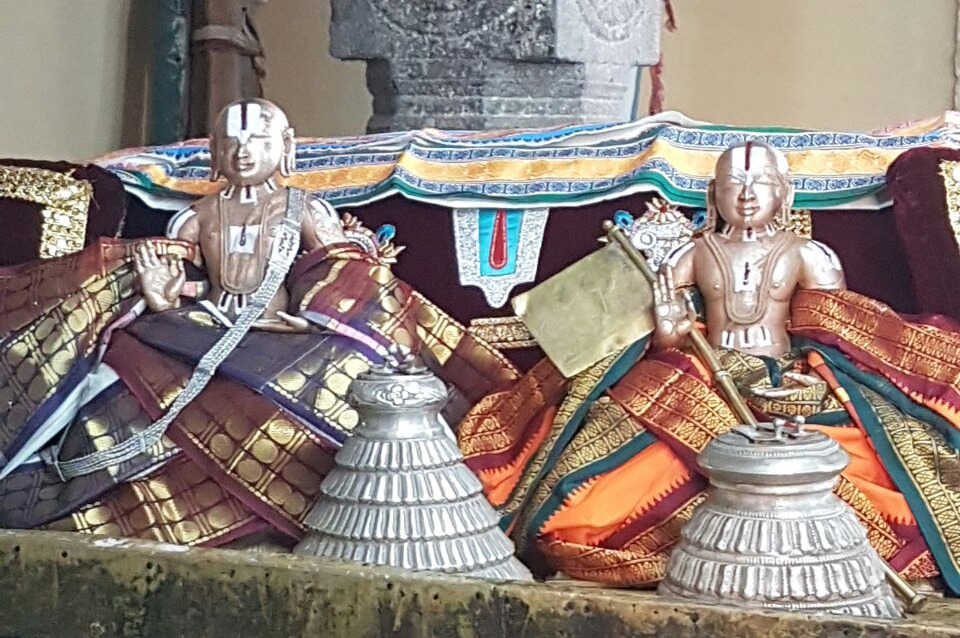
- Nathamuni and Sri Aalavandar in Kattumannarkoil

Personal life
- Born: Aranganathan; 823 CE Viranayana (present-day Kattumannarkoil, Tamil Nadu, India)
- Died: 951 CE Gangaikonda Cholapuram, Tamil Nadu, India
- Children: Iśvara Muni
- Parent: Iśvara Bhaṭṭa (father)
- Notable work: Naalayira Divya Prabandham

Religious life
- Religion: Hinduism
- Denomination: Sri Vaishnavism
- Philosophy: Sri Vaishnavism
- Movement: Bhakti

Religious career
- Influenced: Ramanuja

Nathamuni, also known as Sri Ranganathamuni (823 – 951 CE), was a Vaishnava theologian who collected and compiled the Naalayira Divya Prabandham. Considered the first of the Sri Vaishnava acharyas, Nathamuni is also the author of the Yogarahasya and the Nyayatattva.

== Biography ==
=== Early life ===
Nathamuni is generally considered to have been born in 823 CE and died in 951 CE. His birth name was Aranganathan; however, he came to be known as Nathamuni, which literally means Saint-Lord (Nāthan - lord, muni - saint/sage). An alternative view is that he was born in 582 CE and died in 922 CE. Yet another view holds that Nathamuni was born at Veeranarayanapuram shortly after 907 CE and flourished during the 10th century. The traditional view that he lived for more than 400 years is untenable. It is likely that Nathamuni lived for slightly over a hundred years in the region governed by the Chola kings prior to their peak prominence. His birth star (nakshatra) was Anusham.

=== Background and journey to Kumbakonam ===
Although there is difficulty in establishing Nathamuni's exact date of birth and lifespan, he is considered to have lived during the lineage (paramparā) Madhurakavi Alvar. According to Sri Vaishnava tradition, Nathamuni once conversed with his father regarding the legend of the Prabandhams composed by the Alvars. His father, Ishvara Bhattar, noted that these hymns were long lost and would be impossible to retrieve without the divine grace of Narayana. Inspired by this conversation, Nathamuni embarked on a pilgrimage to the Sarangapani Temple in Kumbakonam, where Vishnu is worshipped under the epithet Aravamudhan. There, he heard priests reciting ten particular pasurams (hymns) dedicated to Aravamudhan by the saint Nammalvar. Overjoyed upon hearing these hymns, he inquired about their origins. However, the priests explained that only ten pasurams were known to them out of a total of 1,292 composed by Nammalvar.

=== Search at Thirukurugur and spiritual mastery ===
Placing immense faith in Aravamudhan, Nathamuni traveled to Thirukurugur, the birthplace of Nammalvar. There, he inquired about Nammalvar's compositions from the direct descendants of Madhurakavi Alvar. The descendants provided Nathamuni with ten pasurams composed by Madhurakavi himself, titled the Kanninun Cirutampu. They informed Nathamuni that whoever recited these ten pasurams with deep devotion would attain the audience of Nammalvar. With complete faith, Nathamuni began chanting the hymn 12,000 times under the sacred tamarind tree where Nammalval had sat during his life. Upon completing the recitation 12,000 times, Vishvaksena—the commander of Vishnu's celestial forces and the divine origin of Nammalvar's incarnation—appeared to bless Nathamuni.

=== Recovery of the compendium and legacy ===
Nammalvar then appeared directly before Nathamuni and bestowed upon him not only his own 1,292 hymns, but all 4,000 pasurams composed by the twelve Alvars. Overjoyed, Nathamuni returned to Kumbakonam and profusely expressed his gratitude to both Aravamudhan and Nammalvar. Having recovered these sacred works, Nathamuni successfully compiled and revived the Naalayira Divya Prabandham, thereby establishing himself as the first ācharya (preceptor) of the Sri Vaishnava tradition. In Sri Vaishnava theology, Nathamuni is revered as an incarnation of Gajananar, a nityasuri of Vaikuntha. His spiritual lineage culminated in Ramanuja, who is regarded in the tradition as an avatar of Adishesha.

The spiritual relationship between Nammalvar and Nathamuni is attested by the Guru-paramparā in traditional works such as Divya Sūri Charita and Prappannāmṛta. The Prappannāmṛta also attests that Nathamuni was born in the village Veeranarayanapuram. Veeranarayanapuram is today generally identified as Kattumannarkoil. According to some accounts, Nathamuni died at Gangaikonda Cholapuram. Nathamuni's son was Iśvaramuni, whose own son, Yamunacharya, was likely named to commemorate a pilgrimage that Nathamuni undertook to the banks of the Yamuna River with his son (Iśvara Muni) and daughter-in-law.

He is also known in Sri Vaishnava tradition by the titles Sadamarsana Kula Tilakar, Sottai Kulaththu Arasar, and Ranganatha Acharya. He subsequently taught the hymns to his two nephews and introduced their recitation into the services at the Sri Ranganathaswamy Temple in Srirangam while he was the temple's administrator.

=== Other contributions ===
Temple rituals in Vaishnavism are based primarily on two early traditions. The first is the Vaikhanasa Sutra, associated with the Krishna Yajurveda school. The other is the Pancharatra Agama, part of the broader Agamic literature, traditionally held to have been revealed by Narayana himself. This tradition incorporates the Bhagavata philosophy, an ancient system referenced in the Mahabharata and Brahma Sutras of Badarayana. Nathamuni established the recitation of the Tamil Veda (Divya Prabandham) during major temple festivals. He is also credited as the originator of the Araiyar Sevai tradition.

Nathamuni is the author of two works which are no longer extant: the Yogarahasya and the Nyāyatattva. The Nyāyatattva was certainly influential, however, in the writings of Ramanuja and Vedanta Desika from the Vishishtadvaita Vedanta tradition. Vedanta Desika quotes from it numerous times in his philosophical treatise the Nyāyasiddhāñjana.

== Legend ==
=== The court dancer ===
Nammalvar's hymns are recited at Srirangam and other places of Vishnu worship. According to tradition, Nathamuni set these verses to music following their recovery and compilation. During this period, a court dancer performed before the Chola King at Gangaikondacholapuram using the same celestial tune (raga) to which Nathamuni had set the prabandhams. As the rare melody was not understood by th ecourt, the king dismissed her performance. The dancer then travelled to the Vishnu temple at Veeranarayanapuram and performed the same melody, which was praised by Nathamuni, who recognized its subtle nuances. Upon learning that Nathamuni had praised her performance, the king visited the temple to inquire why Nathamuni valued that unfamiliar melody. To demonstrate his musical perception, Nathamuni had several cymbals sounded simultaneously and correctly identified the weight of each cymbalbased on its pitch. Convinced by this demonstration, the king acknowledged the superiority of the celestial tune (raga).

Scholars note anachronism in this account: during Nathamuni's era in the ninth century, Uraiyur was the designated Chola capital, whereas Gangaikonda Cholapuram was not founded until the eleventh century. However, local traditions suggest the site functioned as a royal retreat or secondary residence prior to the city's formal establishment.

=== Uyyakondar and his disciple Pundarikaksha ===
One of Nathamuni's disciples was Pundarikaksha, who left no written works. It is believed that Nathamuni foresaw the birth of his grandson Yamunacharya and assigned Pundarikaksha as the child's spiritual guru; Pundarikaksha later passed this responsibility to his own desciple, Ramamisra.

Nathamuni once asked Pundarikaksha to escort his wife Aravindappavai, to her father Vangipurathachi's house. Upon arriving, Pundarikaksha was served stale food and seated outside because he belonged to the (Choliah) subgroup of Brahmins, who faced discrimination from other local Brahmin communities. He did not resent the treatment, instead he accepted the food as Vaishnava prasadam. When Nathamuni heard of this incident, he viewed this action as a mark of high spiritual maturity and bestowed him with the title Uyyakondar (saviour of the new dispensation).
