= Theripanai =

- Village
- Location within Tamil Nadu Location within India
- Coordinates: 8.44289°N 77.97518°E
- Country: India
- State: Tamil Nadu
- District: Thoothukudi
- Subdistrict: Satankulam
- Time zone: UTC+05:30 (IST)
- Pincode: 628701

Theripanai is a village situated in Thoothukudi District, in the Indian state of Tamil Nadu. It is located in Eluvaraimuki, Sathankulam.

== Geography ==
Theripanai is located at 8.44289°N 77.97518°E.

== Theripanai School ==
TDTA Middle School is a private, coeducational, Tamil school. It was established in 1940.

== Temples ==
The village hosts 8 temples and one church. The temples are Dharma Sastha, Purana Devi and Puskala Devi, Vinayagar and Naagar, Navagragar, Perumal, Muthumaalai Amman, Brama Shakthi, Narayana Swamy, Sivalapariyan Swammygal, Esakki Amman and Soodalaimada Sway.

== Festivals ==
Every year In Theripanai there is a 5 days temple festival in the month of May. For this Kovil Kudai people of Theripanai comes from the metro Cities like Chennai, Mumbai and from Kovai, Madurai, Udumalpet. For these Kovil Kudai, money is collected in the form of Vari from the people of Theripanai. These 5 days is a great entertainment to the people of Theripanai and for these 5 days, morning, afternoon and night's food is arranged to the peoples of Theripanai. An older famous 'Villu Pattu' tradition is still alive in this Thoothukudi Village.
