= Madhurakavi Alvar =

Tamil poet-saint

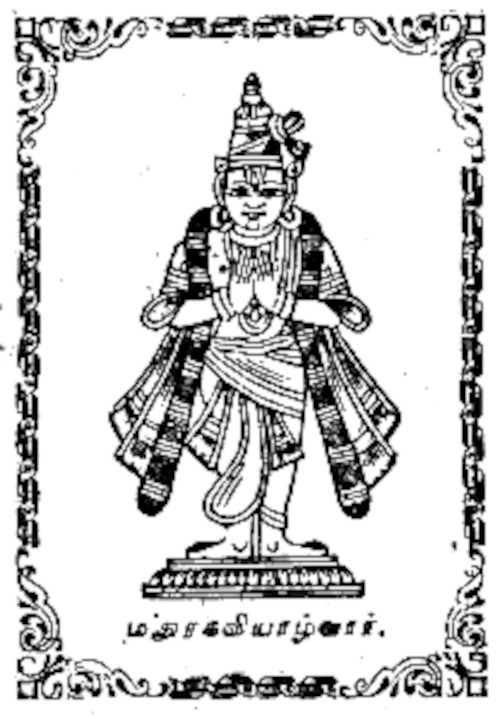

Personal life
- Born: April 25, 8th century Thirukollur
- Notable work: Kanninun Cirutampu

Religious life
- Religion: Hinduism
- Philosophy: Vaishnava Bhakti

Madhurakavi Alvar was one of the twelve Alvar saints of Tamil Nadu, recognized for their affiliation with the Sri Vaishnava tradition of Hinduism. The hymns of the Alvars are compiled as the Naalayira Divya Prabandham, and the 108 temples revered in these hymns are classified as Divya Desams. Madhurakavi Alvar is traditionally counted as the sixth among the twelve Alvars. He was a disciple of Nammalvar; Madhurakavi Alvar composed 11 of the 4,000 hymns in the Naalayira Divya Prabandham. Madhurakavi Alvar is credited with recording and compiling the works of Nammalvar, including the Tiruvaymoli (1,102 hymns). The 11 hymns of Kanninun Cirutampu composed by Madhurakavi Alvar was the catalyst for recovering the 4,000 hymns of Naalayira Divya Prabandham. The scholar Nathamuni recited these 11 hymns 12,000 times to invoke Nammalvar and recover the lost Naalayira Divya Prabandham.

According to tradition, Nammalvar remained silent from birth, sitting beneath a tamarind tree. Madhurakavi Alvar followed a bright light shining in the south until he reached the tree, where Nammalvar spoke his first words. The compositions of Madhurakavi Alvar, along with those of the other Alvars, shaped the philosophical and theological foundations of Sri Vaishnavism. The hymns of Madhurakavi and the other Alvars are recited during daily worship and annual festivals in Vishnu temples across Tamil Nadu.

== Life ==
Madhurakavi Alvar was born into a Brahmin family in Thirukkolur near Alwarthirunagari, under the Chitra Nakshatra in the month of Chittirai. The temple's presiding deity is Vaithamaanidhi, a name translating to 'repository of great wealth'. In Sri Vaishnava tradition, Madhurakavi Alvar is regarded as an incarnation of Kumuda (a disciple of Vishvaksena, commander of Vishnu's forces) or of Garuda, Vishnu's Vahana. According to these accounts, Madhurakavi Alvar lived during the lifetime of Nammalvar, who is himself considered an incarnation of Vishvaksena.

Madhurakavi Alvar studied the Vedas and was well-versed in both Tamil and Sanskrit, composing hymns in praise of Vishnu. He later renounced worldly life to seek spiritual liberation (moksha), embarking on a pilgrimage to northern Indian pilgrimage centers including Ayodhya and Mathura.

=== Meeting Nammalvar ===
According to tradition, while Madhurakavi Alvar was in Ayodhya on a pilgrimage visiting temples dedicated to Rama, Sita, Lakshmana, and Hanuman, he observed a glowing light in the southern sky. Uncertain of its origin, he observed the light moving southward and decided to follow it. The light guided him to Alwarthirunagari, where it vanished. Madhurakavi Alvar had previously heard of a sixteen-year-old youth (Nammalvar) in the town who had remained motionless and silent beneath a tamarind tree since birth. He went to the tree where Nammalvar sat in meditation and dropped a stone to test his awareness. Receiving no reaction, Madhurakavi Alvar posed a philosophical riddle:

செத்ததன் வயிற்றில் சிறியது பிறந்தால் எத்தைத்தின்று எங்கே கிடக்கும்? (If a tiny entity is born in the womb of the dead, what will it eat and where will it rest?)

Nammalvar broke his lifelong silence and replied:

அத்தைத் தின்று அங்கே கிடக்கும் (It will eat that and stay there!)

The exchange implied that if the soul identifies with the material body, it remains bound to it, but if it focuses on the divine, it abides in Vaikuntha.

=== Story of the idols ===
When Nammalvar was about to depart (leave this mortal world) for Vaikuntha, Madhurakavi Alvar asked him how he should proceed. Nammalvar instructed him to boil the waters from the Thamirabarani River, stating that an image would form during the process; Madhurakavi Alvar followed his instructions. Upon boiling the water, an image of Ramanuja emerged, surprising Madhurakavi Alvar, as it did not resemble Nammalvar. When Madhurakavi Alwar brought the image to Nammalvar, the sage explained that it represented Bhavishyadhacharya (future guru), who would be born 4,000 years later. He instructed Madhurakavi Alvar to repeat the process, whereupon Madhurakavi Alvar obtained the image of Nammalvar himself.

== Works ==
The eleven hymns composed by Madhurakavi Alvar are titled as Kanninun Cirutampu, each consisting of four lines in praise of his teacher, Nammalvar. These hymns are compiled in Naalayira Divya Prabandham alongside the works of the eleven other Alvars. Madhurakavi Alvar set Nammalvar's compositions to music and helped propagate his works across the region. The hymn opens with the line "The name of the great one, my acharya of Kurukoor, brings nectar to my tongue and is far sweeter than the name of the Lord". According to tradition, Madhurakavi Alvar recorded and compiled all the hymns of Nammalvar's Tiruvaymoli as the sage recited them.
