= Eral =

Town in the Tuticorin district

- Taluk
- Nickname: Trading Center
- Location in Tamil Nadu, India
- Coordinates: 8.63°N 78.02°E
- Country: India
- State: Tamil Nadu
- District: Thoothukudi

Population (2004)
  - Total: 19,284

Languages
  - Official: Tamil
- Time zone: UTC+5:30 (IST)
- PIN: 628801
- Vehicle registration: TN92
- Website: http://www.townpanchayat.in/eral

Eral is a town in the Tuticorin district in the state of Tamil Nadu, India.

== Demographics ==
As of 2001 India census, Eral had a population of 9284. Males constitute 49% of the population and females 51%. Eral has an average literacy rate of 81%, higher than the national average of 59.5%: male literacy is 84%, and female literacy is 78%. In Eral, 11% of the population is under 6 years of age.
