= Adinatha Perumal Temple =

Hindu temple in Tamil Nadu, India

Alwarthirunagari Perumal Temple
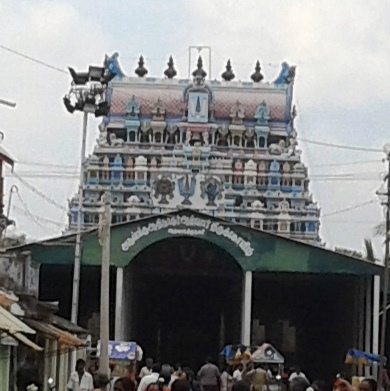

- Location in Tamil Nadu, India

Religion
- Affiliation: Hinduism
- District: Thoothukudi
- Deity: Adi Nathar (Vishnu), Polinthu Nindra Piran Adi Natha Valli (Lakshmi)
- Features: Tower: Govinda Gopuram; Temple tank: Brahma Theertham

Location
- Location: Alwarthirunagiri
- State: Tamil Nadu
- Country: India
- Coordinates: 8°36′25.6″N 77°56′17.9″E

Architecture
- Type: Dravidian architecture
- Elevation: 44 m (144 ft)

Sri Adinatha Aazhwar Temple, or Adinatha Perumal Temple, is a Hindu temple dedicated to the god Vishnu, situated in the town of Alwarthirunagari, Thoothukudi district, in the Indian state of Tamil Nadu. It is located 26 km from Tirunelveli. Constructed in the Dravidian style of architecture, the temple is glorified in the Naalayira Divya Prabandham, the early medieval Tamil canon of the Alwar saints from the 6th–9th centuries CE. It is one of the 108 Divya Desams dedicated to Vishnu, who is worshipped as Adinathar and his consort Lakshmi as Adinathanayaki. The temple is also classified as a Navatirupathi, the nine temples revered by Nammalvar located in the banks of Tamiraparani river. The temple is the most prominent among the nine Navatirupathi temples. The temple is one of the Navagraha temples in Vaishnavism, associated with Jupiter, also known as Brihaspati.

A granite wall surrounds the temple, enclosing all its shrines and two of its three bodies of water. The rajagopuram, the temple's gateway tower, is 95 ft (29 m) tall. The temple is considered the birthplace of Nammalvar, considered the most prominent among the twelve Alvars Saints. The temple follows Tenkalai tradition of worship. Six daily rituals and three yearly festivals are held at the temple, of which the ten-day annual Brahmotsavam during the Tamil month of Chittirai (April - May) and the Nammalvar birth celebrations with Garudasevai with all nine temple of Navatirupathi, being the most prominent. The temple is maintained and administered by the Hindu Religious and Endowment Board of the Government of Tamil Nadu.

== Legend ==
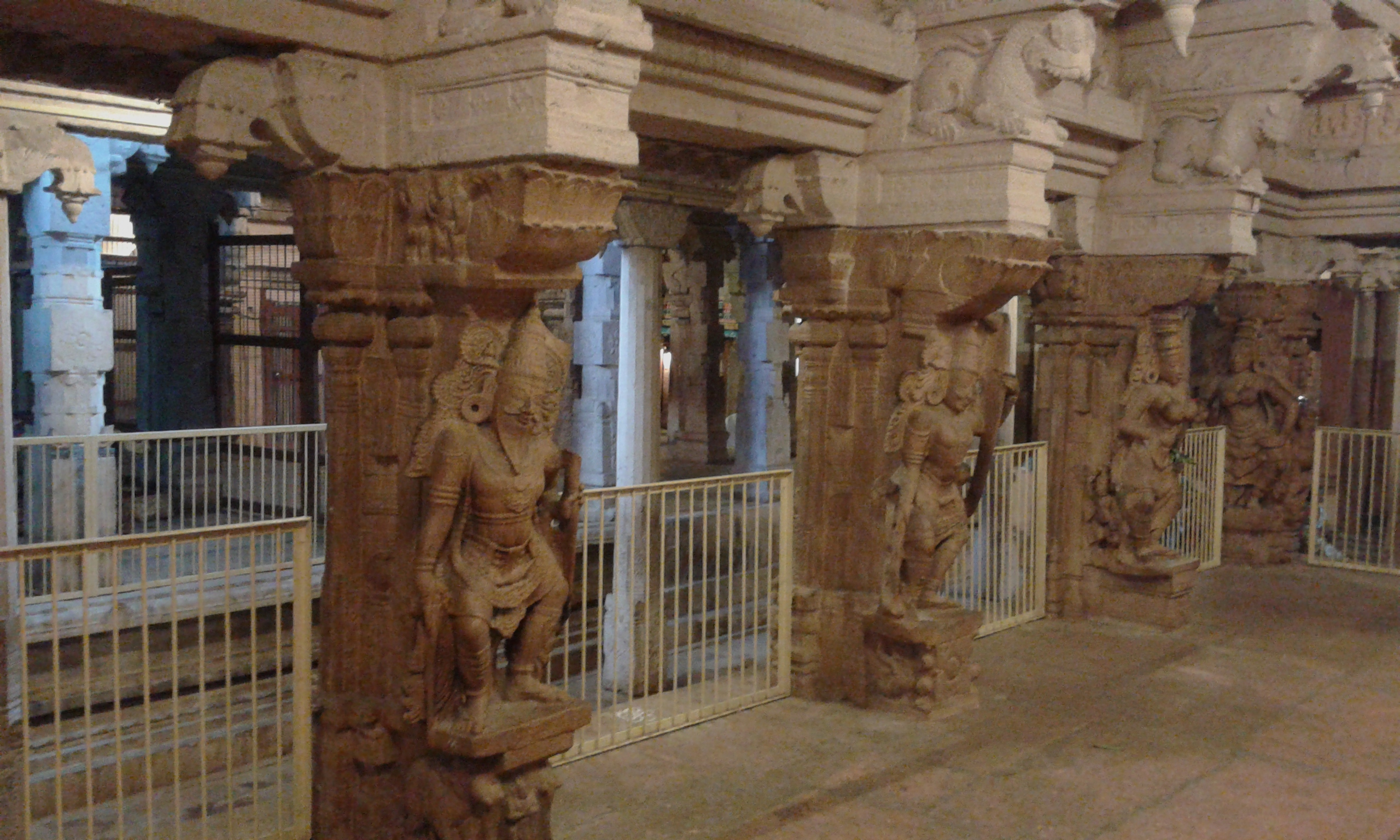
Hall near the sanctum

Alwar Tirunagari is believed to be the largest town in the time of Pandya kings. The distinguishing name, with Alvar in Tamil prefixed to Thirunagari means the people who spoke languages first and speaks correct language. The temple is considered the birthplace of Nammalvar, considered the most prominent among the twelve Alvars Saints. Nammalvar has contributed more than thousand verses out of the four thousand in Naalayira Divya Prabhandam, the Vaishnava canon.

According to traditional scriptures, Nammalvar was born in 43rd Kali of 3059 BCE. He was born in a Vellalar family at Thirukurukur (modern day Alwarthirunagiri) in the southernmost region of the Tamil country. According to legend, as a child he responded to no external stimuli and his parents left him at the feet of the deity of Sri Adhinathar of Nagar tribe in Alwarthirunagari. The child then got up and climbed into a hole in a tamarind tree, sat in the lotus position, and began to meditate. It appears he was in this state for as long as sixteen years when a Tamil poet and scholar in Madurai named Madhurakavi Alwar saw a bright light shining in the south, and followed it until he reached the tree where the boy was residing. Unable to elicit any reaction from the child, he asked him a riddle: "If the small is born in a dead's body (or stomach), what will it eat and where will it stay?" meaning, if the subtle soul is embodied in the gross body, what are its actions and thoughts? Nammalvar broke his lifelong silence and responded, "That it will eat, it will rest!" meaning that if the soul identifies with the body, it will be the body but if it serves the divine, it will stay in Vaikuntha and eat (think) of Vishnu. Madhurakavi Alwar realized the divinity of this child and became a devotee of the child. The works of Nammalwar were compiled by Madhurakavi as four different works, the Tiruvaymoli (1102 verses), Thiruviruttam (100 verses), Thiruvaasiriam (7 verses) and Periya Thiruvanthadi (87 verses). The works of Nammalwar contributed to the philosophical and theological ideas of Vaishnavism. Along with the three Samaya Kuravargal, the Shaiva Nayanars Appar, Sundarar and Sambandar, they influenced the ruling Pallava kings and queens, changing the religious geography from Buddhism and Jainism to Hinduism.

== Architecture ==
A granite wall surrounds the temple, enclosing all its shrines and two of its three bodies of water. The rajagopuram, the temple's gateway tower, is 95 ft (29 m) tall. Vishnu is worshipped here as Aathinathan or Aathipiran. The Svamyabhu Murti of Vishnu faces east and is in standing posture. The feet of the murti are buried under earth. Lakshmi and Bhumi are worshipped here as Aathinathanayaki and Thirukkurukornayaki. The shrine is located on the banks of Thamiraparani River. The sacred water body in the temple is known as Brahma Tirtha. In modern times, the temple is maintained and administered by the Hindu Religious and Endowment Board of the Government of Tamil Nadu. The temples houses a number of paintings depicting various scenes of the epic Ramayana. There are composite pillars in the temple numbering 48 which has remarkable sculptures. There is a tamarind tree on the precincts of the temple, which is believed to have been the birth place of Nammalvar. Devotees take strips of the trees for medicinal purposes.

== Religious significance ==
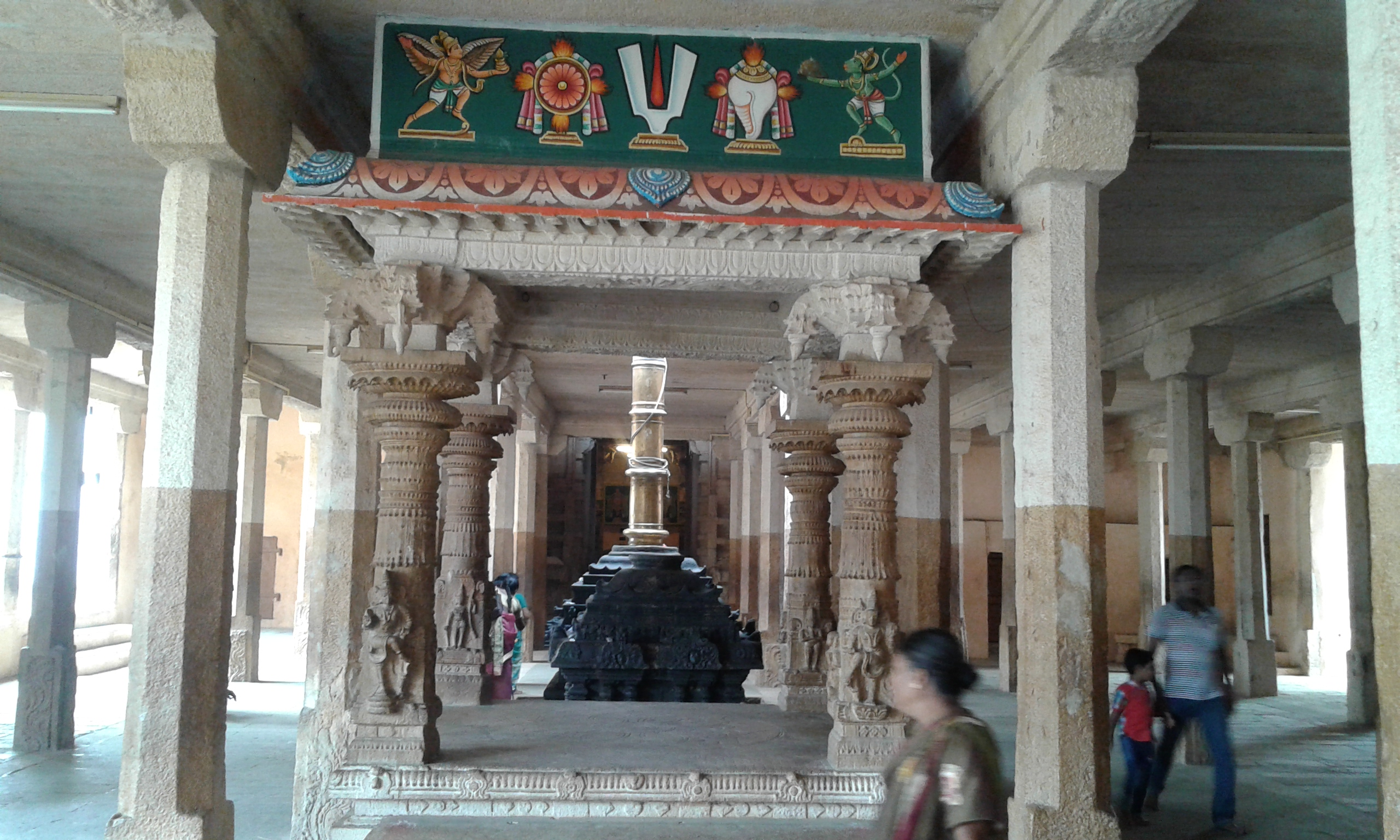
Hall near the gopuram

Brahmanda Purana one of the eighteen sacred texts of Hinduism and written by Vyasa contains a chapter called Navatirupati Mahatmyam. The second part of the chapter refers to Alwar Thirunagari. The temple is revered in Nalayira Divya Prabandham, the 7th–9th century Vaishnava canon, by Nammalvar. The temple is classified as a Divya Desam, one of the 108 Vishnu and Lakshmi temples that are mentioned in the book. The temple is also classified as a Navatirupati, the nine temples revered by Nammalvar located in the banks of Thamirabarani river. The temple is the most prominent among the nine Navatirupati temples. Nammalvar makes a reference about the temple in his works in Tiruvaymoli. During the 18th and 19th centuries CE, the temple finds mention in several works like 108 Tirupati Anthati by Divya Kavi Pillai Perumal Aiyangar. The temple also forms a series of Navagraha temples where each of the nine planetary deities of one of the temples of Navatirupathi. The temple is associated with the planet Jupiter, also known as Brihaspati.
