= Alwarthirunagari =

- town
- Location in Tamil Nadu, India Alwarthirunagari (India)
- Coordinates: 8.61°N 77.94°E
- Country: India
- State: Tamil Nadu
- District: Thoothukudi

Population (2001)
  - Total: 8,876

Languages
  - Official: Tamil
- Time zone: UTC+5:30 (IST)

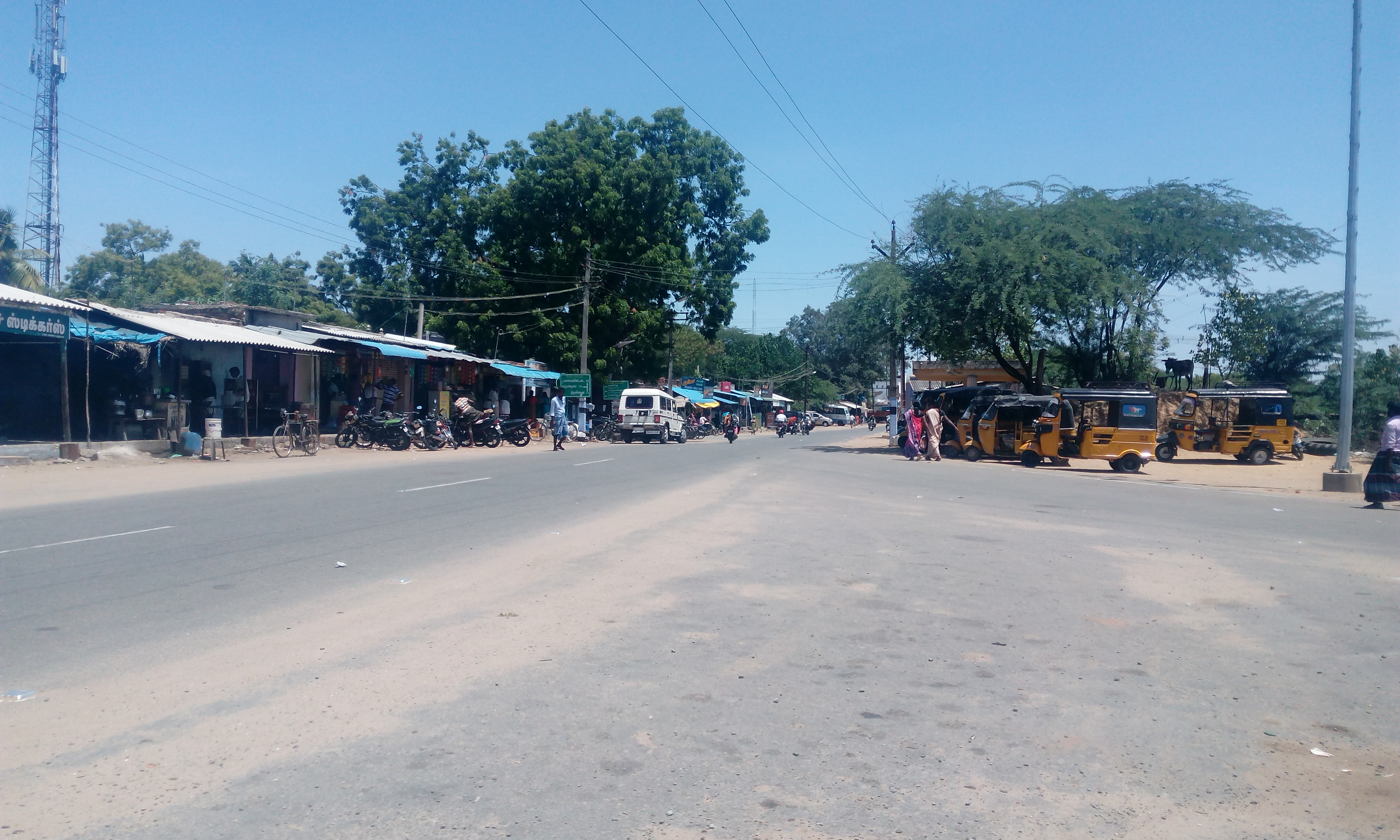
Alwarthirunagari main road

Alwarthirunagari is a panchayat town in Thoothukudi district in the state of Tamil Nadu, India. It is next to Srivaikuntam on the Tirunelveli - Tiruchendur Highway, Tamil Nadu, southern India. It's about 31 km from Tirunelveli and 29 km from Tiruchendur, on the banks of the river Tamirabarani. Alwarthirunagari is the birthplace of alwar saint Nammalvar. The temple is classified as a "Divya Desam", the 108 temples of Sri Narayana revered by the 12 poet saints, or Alwars.

== Demographics ==
As of 2011 India census, Alwarthirunagari had a population of 9.289. Males constitute 49% of the population and females 51%. Alwarthirunagari has an average literacy rate of 82%, higher than the national average of 74.4%;

As of 2001 India census, Alwarthirunagari had a population of 8876. Males constitute 48% of the population and females 52%. Alwarthirunagari has an average literacy rate of 78%, higher than the national average of 59.5%; with 50% of the males and 50% of females literate. 11% of the population is under 6 years of age.

== Nammalvar ==
Alwarthirunagari is the birthplace of Nammalvar, one of the 12 Alvars of Vaishnavism. It is also one of the Nava Tirupathis of South Tamil Nadu.

== Manavala Mamunigal ==
Alwarthirunagari is also the birthplace of Manavala Mamunigal, a major proponent of the Sri Vaishnavism tradition in the 15th century in Tamilnadu.

== See also ==
- Alwarthirunagari Temple
- Thirukkoloor
