= Mangalasasanam =

Hindu concept and list of prayers

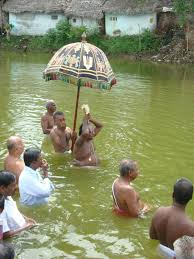
Mangalasasanam delivered at the Thiruindalur temple

Mangalasasanam (Sanskrit: मङ्गलाशासनम्, romanized: Maṅgalaśaṃsanam, lit. 'auspicious felicitations') refers to a religious concept from the Sri Vaishnava tradition of Vaishnavism, where a devotee offers their salutations and felicitations upon God due to a profound sense of concern for the latter, and also as an exercise of forgetting their sense of self.

== Hymns ==
The concept of mangalasasanam is often associated with the pasurams (verses) of the Alvars, who during the early medieval period of Tamil history (between the 7th and 10th centuries CE), worshipped Vishnu and his avatars through their hymns. This collection of their hymns is known as the Naalayira Divya Prabhandham. The Sri Vaishnava shrines that were extolled by the Alvars are called the Divya Desams, where a number of these poet-saints offered their mangalasasanam.

Number of pasurams	1	2	4	5	6	7	9	10	11	12	13	14	20	21	22	24	27	32	33	36	39	40	42	45	47	50	51	110	128	202	247
Number of Divya Desams	15	8	2	2	2	1	1	23	14	8	5	3	1	2	3	1	1	1	1	1	1	1	1	1	1	1	2	1	2	1	1

== Classification ==
The below table provides a classification for the mangalasananams offered by the Alvars:

Prabandam (Hymns)	Alvars (poet-saints)	Number of pasurams
Mudal Āyiram (First thousand)		947
Tiruppallandu	Periyalvar	10
Periyalvar Tirumoli	Periyalvar	463
Tiruppavai	Andal	30
Nachiyar Tirumoli	Andal	143
Perumal Tirumoli	Kulashekhara	105
Tiruchanda Virutham	Thirumalisai Alvar	120
Tirumalai	Thondaradippodi Alvar	45
Tiruppalli	Thondaradippodi Alvar	10
Amalānathipiran	Thiruppaan Alvar	10
Kanninum Siru Thāmbu	Madhurakavi Alvar	11
Periya Tirumoli (Great Hymns)		1134
Periya Tirumoli	Thirumangai Alvar	1084
Thiru Kurun Thāndagam	Thirumangai Alvar	20
Thiru Nedun Thāndagam	Thirumangai Alvar	30
Mundram Āyiram (Third thousand)		701
Mudal Tiruvantati	Poigai Alvar	100
Irandām Tiruvantati	Bhoothatalvar	100
Moondrām Tiruvantati	Peyalvar	100
Nānmugan Tiruvantati	Thirumalisai Alvar	96
Tiruviruttam	Nammalvar	100
Thiru Vāsiriyam	Nammalvar	7
Periya Thiru Andaathi	Nammalvar	87
Thiruveḻukutrirukkai	Thirumangai Alvar	1
Siriya Thirumadal	Thirumangai Alvar	1 (40)
Periya Thirumadal	Thirumangai Alvar	1 (77)
Ramanuja Nootrantati	Tiruvarangathu Amuthanar	108
Tiruvaymoli		1102
Tiruvaymoli	Nammalvar	1102

== Gallery ==
Some of the famous Divya Desams the mangalasanams were uttered include the following temples:

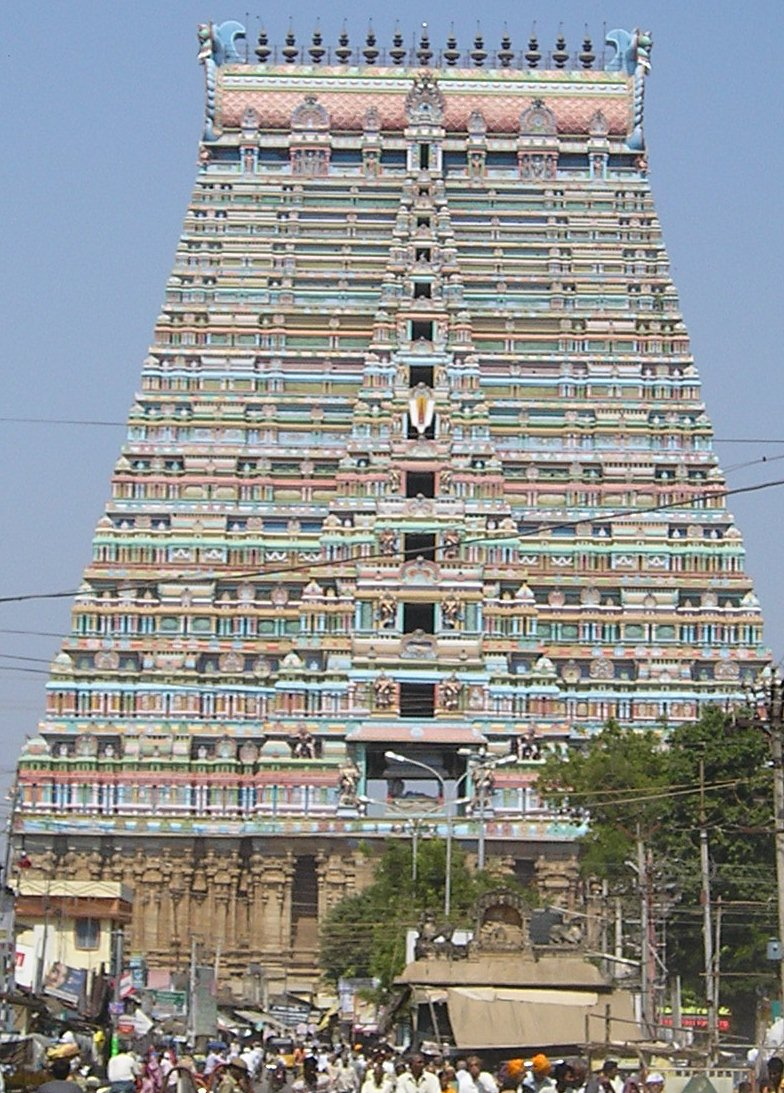
Srirangam Temple

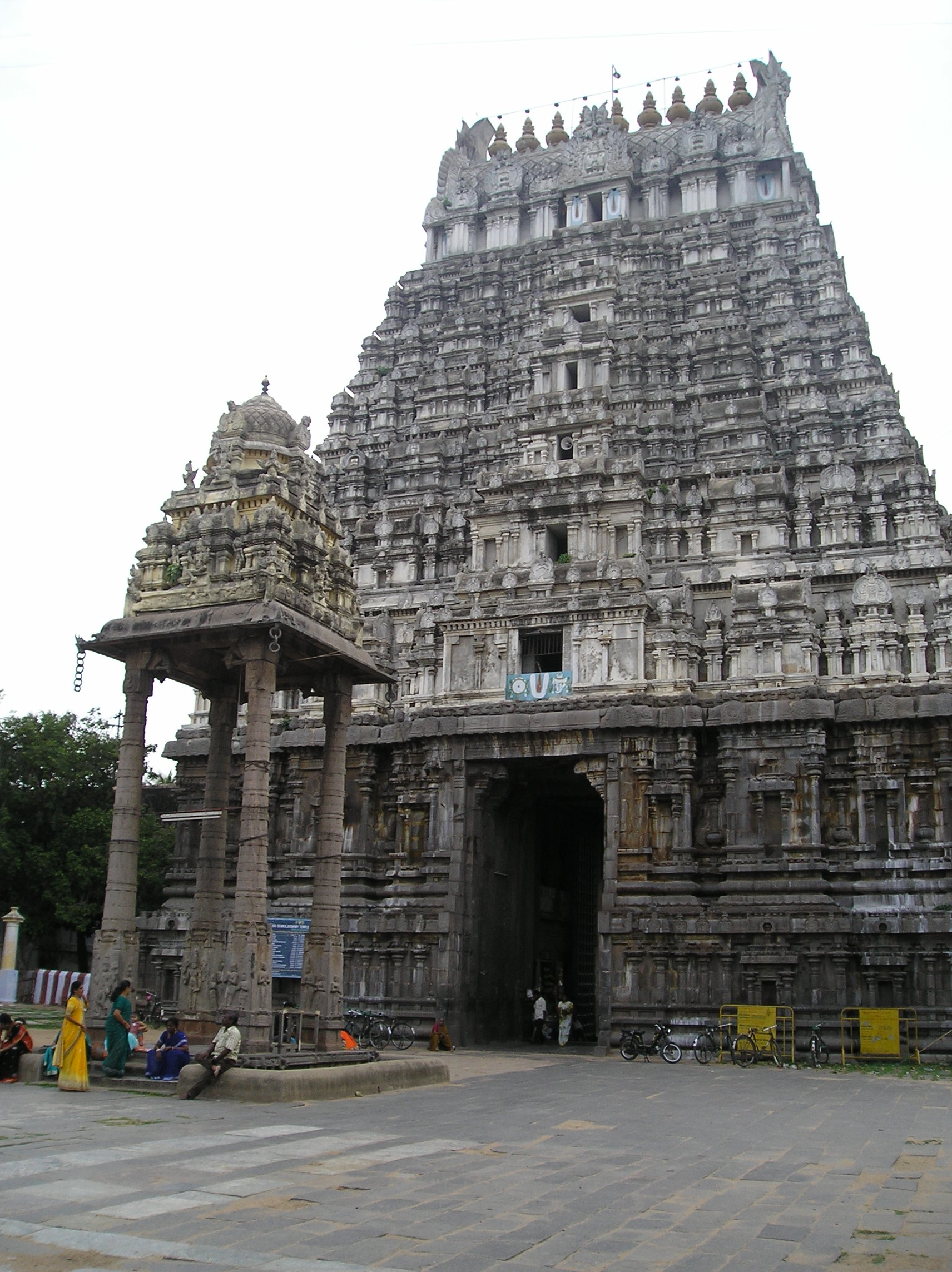
Varadaraja Perumal Temple

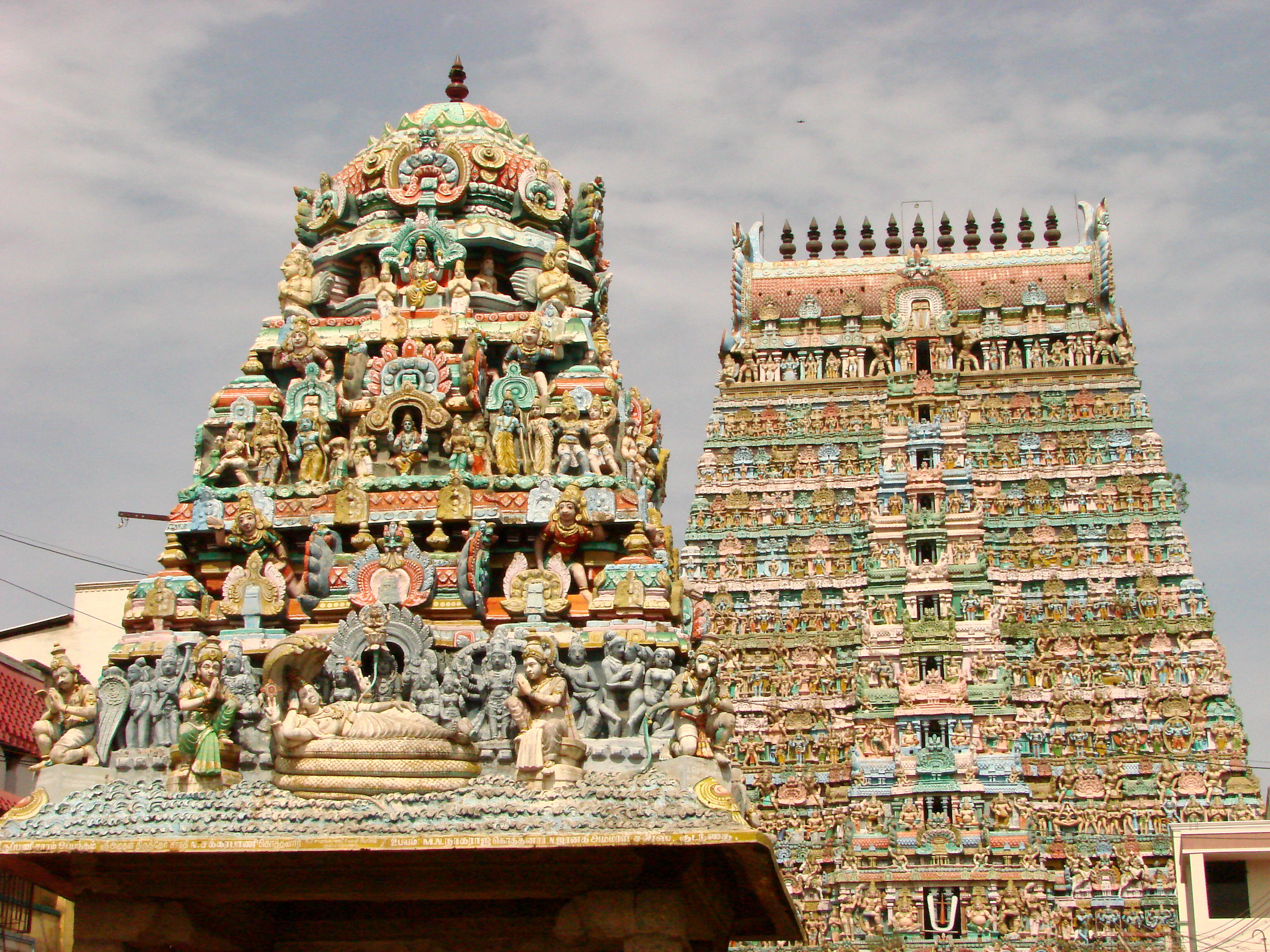
Sarangapani Temple

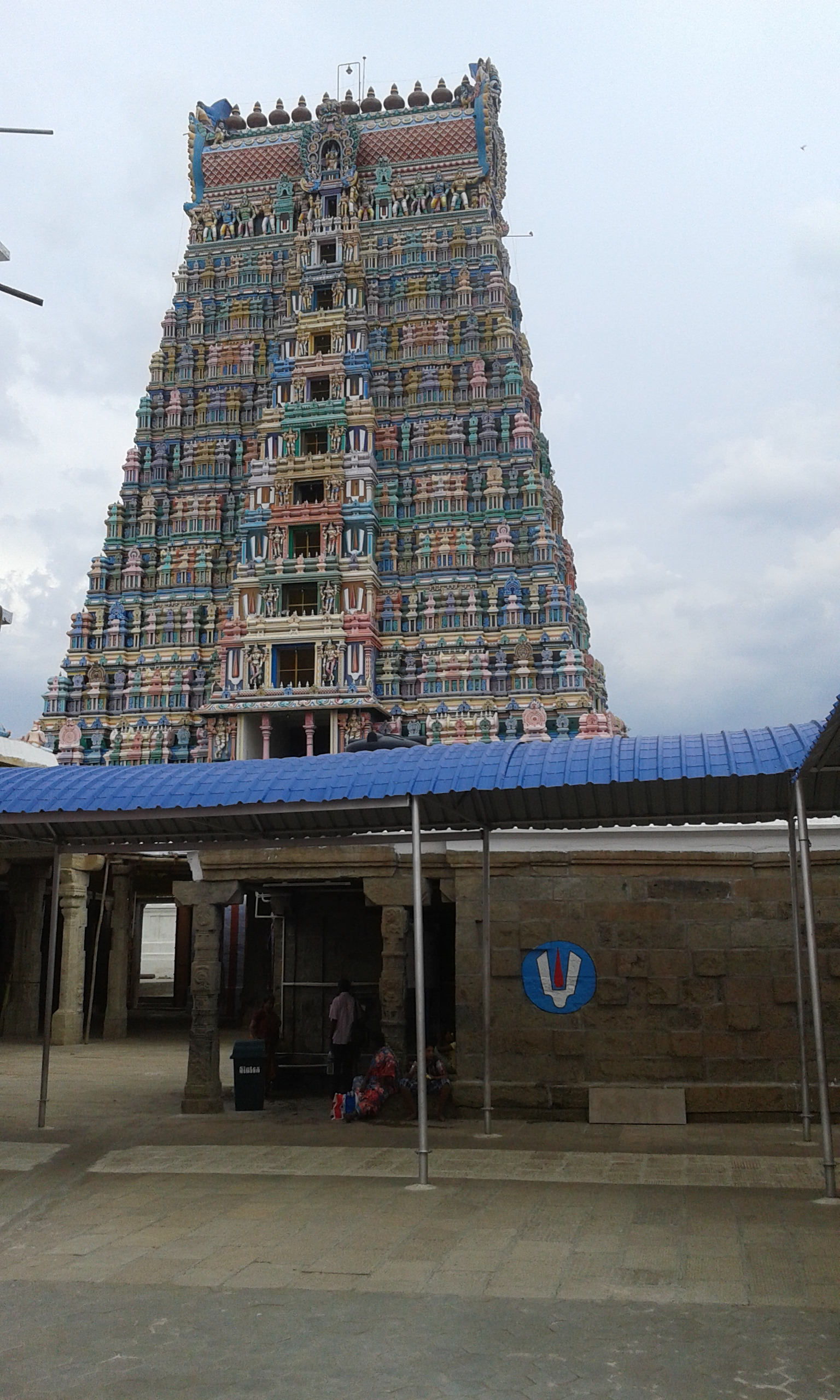
Srivilliputhur Temple

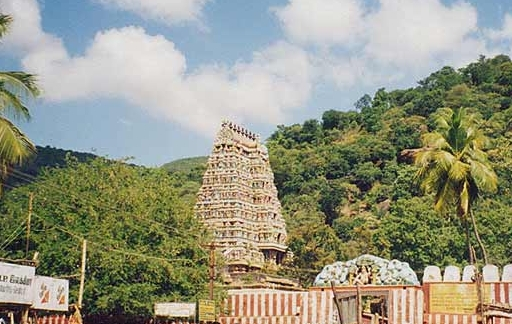
Azhagar Kovil

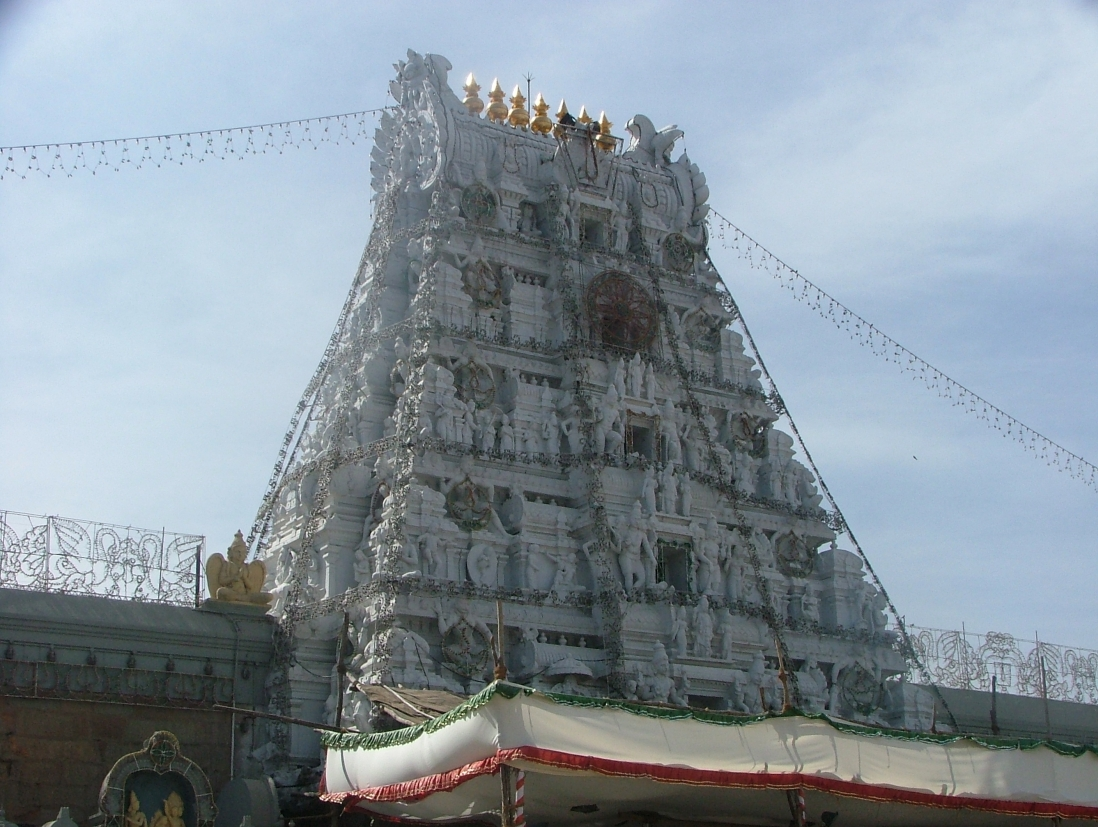
Tirupathi Venkateshwara Temple

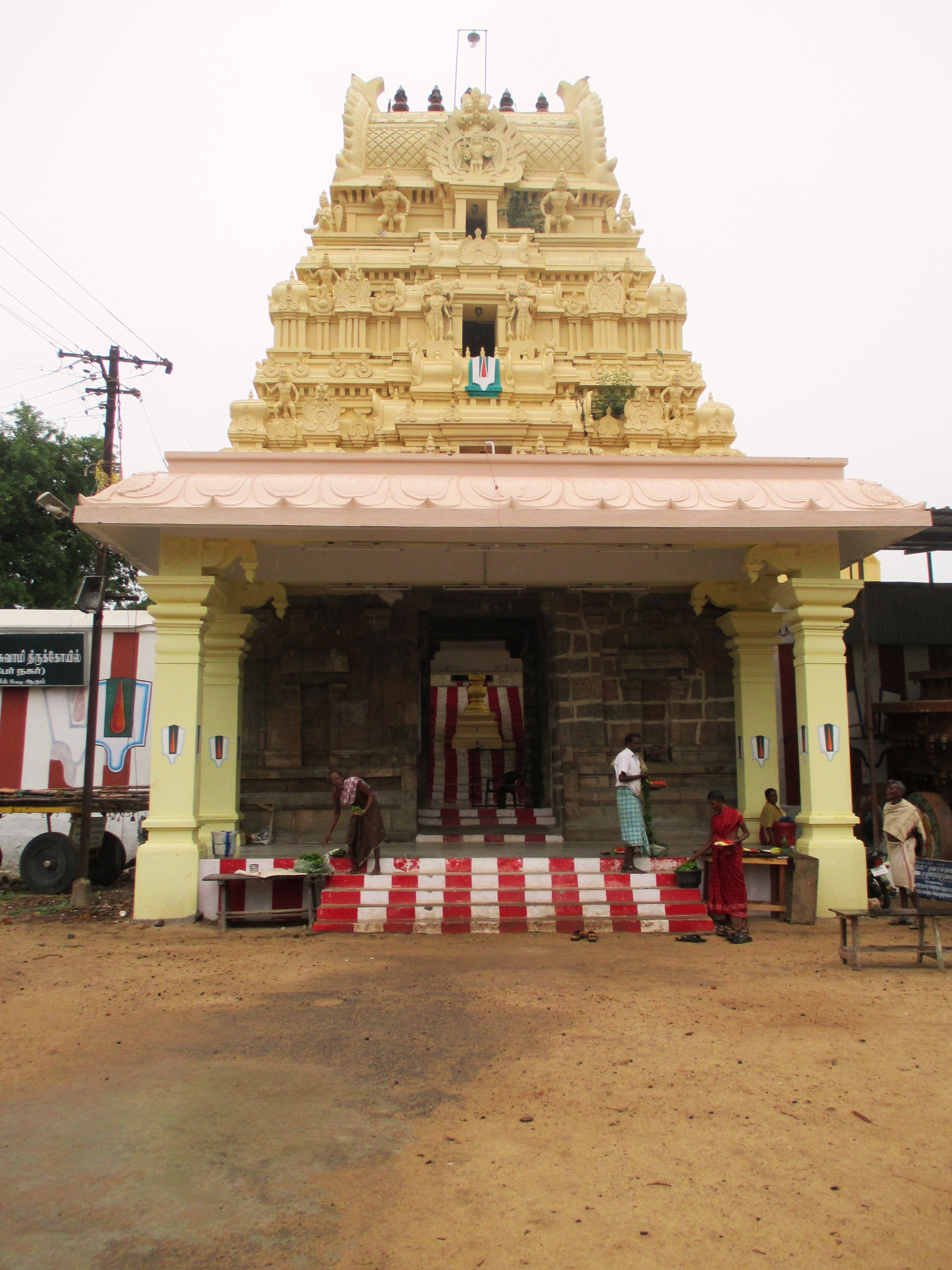
Appakkudathaan Perumal Temple

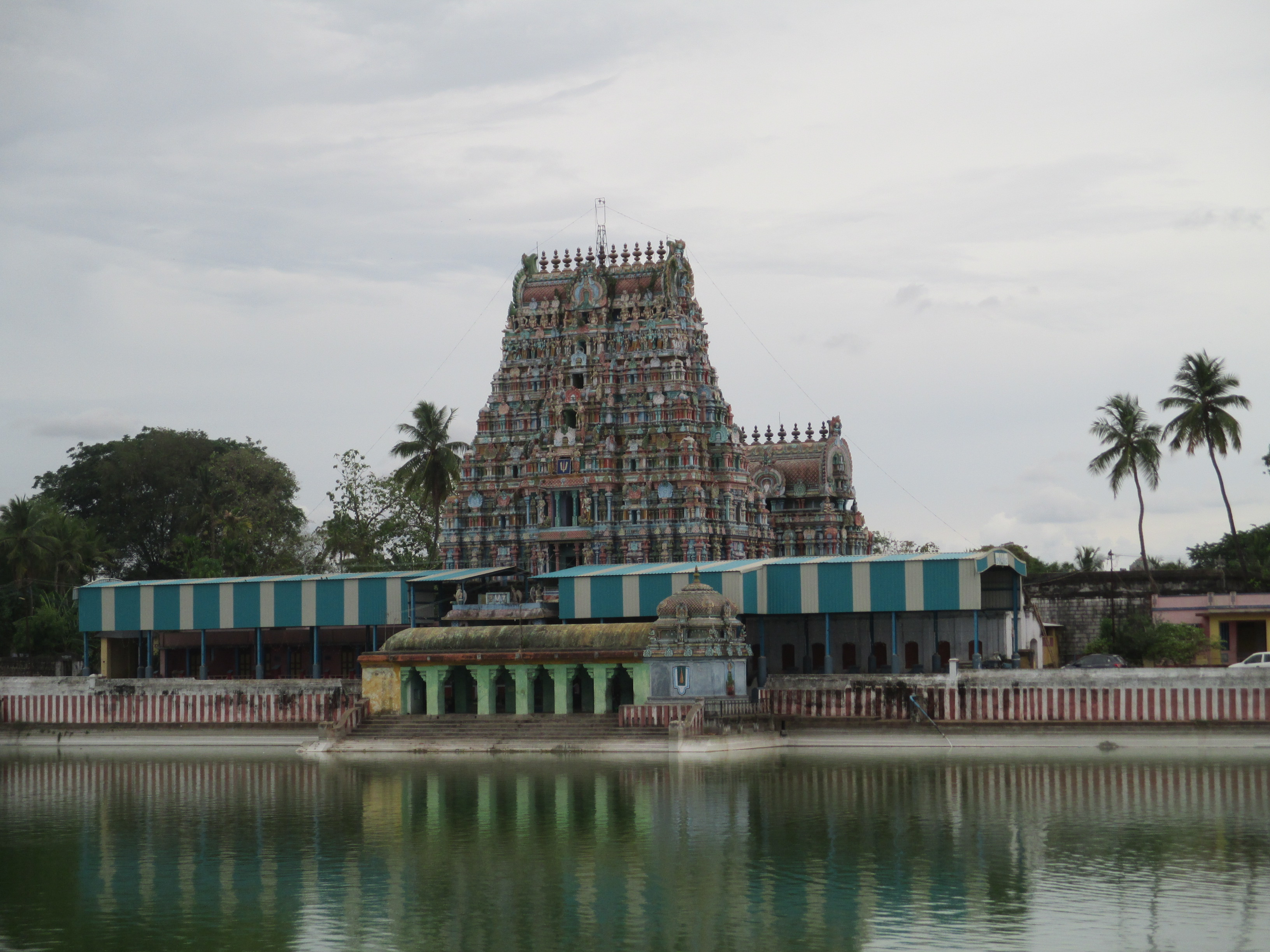
Neelamegha Perumal Temple
