= Thirumandangudi =

Village in Thanjavur, India

- Village
- Country: India
- State: Tamil Nadu
- District: Thanjavur
- Taluk: Papanasam

Population (2001)
  - Total: 697

Languages
  - Official: Tamil
- Time zone: UTC+5:30 (IST)

Thirumandangudi is a village temple dedicated to Sri Ranganathaswamy and is considered the birthplace of Thondaradippodi Alvar, one of the 12 Alvars saints of the 6th-9th century CE. The village is located in the Papanasam taluk of Thanjavur district, Tamil Nadu, India.

== Demographics ==
At the 2001 census, Thirumandangudi had a population of 697 with 354 males and 343 females. The sex ratio was 969. The literacy rate was 76.4%.

== Temples ==
Sri Ranganathaswamy Temple, Thirumandangudi is the birthplace of Thondaradippodi Alvar. There is also Srinivasa Perumal next to Thondaradipodi Alvar statue. Since Thondaradippodi Alvar wanted Ranganatha to get up from reclining posture and hence composed Tirupalliyelluchi. That wish was granted to Alvar at this place which is also his birthplace.
