= Thondaradippodi Alvar =

Poet-saint of the Tamil Vaishnava tradition

Thondaradippodi Alwar
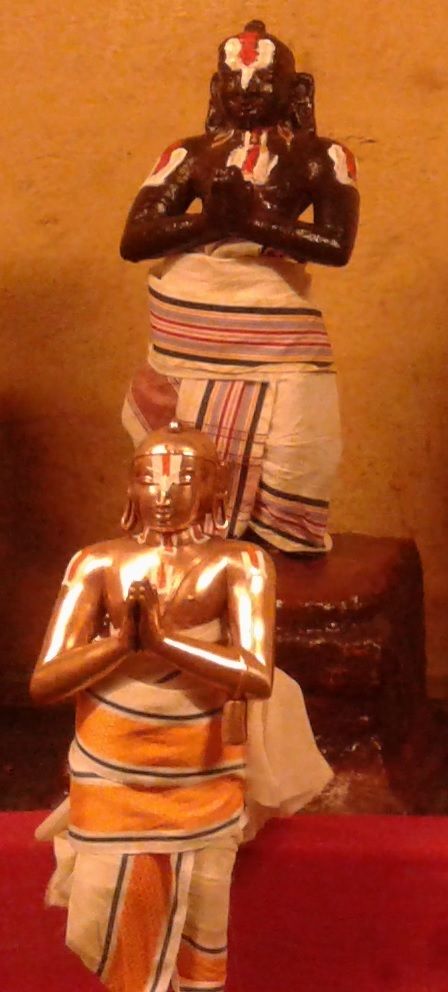
- Image of the granite and festival image of Thondaradipodi in Alwarthirunagari Temple

Personal life
- Born: 8th Century AD Mandangudi
- Notable work(s): Tirumālai and Tirupalliyeḻuchi
- Honors: Alwar saint

Religious life
- Religion: Hinduism
- Philosophy: Vaishnava Bhakti

Thondaradippodi Alwar or Vipra Narayana was one of the twelve Alwar saints of South India, who are known for their affiliation to Vaishnava tradition of Hinduism. The verses of Alwars are compiled as Naalayira Divya Prabandham and the 108 temples revered are classified as Divya desam. Thondaripodi is considered the tenth in the line of the twelve Alwars.

As per Hindu legend, he was born as Vipra Narayana and got devoted to Ranganatha of the Srirangam Ranganathaswamy temple. Since he worshipped even the dust from the devotees of Ranganatha, he attained the name Thondaradipodi.

His works are the Tiruppallieluchi having ten verses, and Tirumālai having forty verses, both of which are counted among the 4000 stanzas in the Naalayira Divya Prabandam. The works of Thondaradipodi and other Alwars contributed to the philosophical and theological ideas of Vaishnavism. Along with the three Saiva nayanmars, they influenced the ruling Pallava kings of the South Indian region, resulting in changing the religious geography from Buddhism and Jainism to the two sects of Hinduism.

In South-Indian Vishnu temples, Thondaradipodi Alwar has images and festivals associated with him. The Vasantha Utsavam festival is celebrated in Srirangam and for nine days in the garden believed to have been maintained by him. The verses of Thondaripodi and other Alwars are recited as a part of daily prayers and during festive occasions in most Vishnu temples in South India.

== Alwars ==
The word Alwar means the one who dives deep into the ocean of the countless attributes of God. Alwars are considered the twelve supreme devotees of Vishnu, who were instrumental in popularising Vaishnavism during the 5th to 8th centuries CE. The religious works of these saints in Tamil, songs of love and devotion, are compiled as Nalayira Divya Prabandham containing 4000 verses and the 108 temples revered in their songs are classified as Divya desam. The saints had different origins and belonged to different castes. As per tradition, the first three Alvars, Poigai, Bhutha and Pei were born miraculously. Bhaktisara was the son of a sage, Thondaradi, Mathurakavi, Vishuchitta and Andal were from the Brahmin community, Kulasekhara from Kshatriya community, Nammalvar was from a Vellalar family, Tirupanar from the musical Panar community and Tirumangaialvar from kalvar community of warriors. Divya Suri Carita by Garuda-Vahana Pandita (11th century CE), Guruparamparaprabavam by Pinbaragiya Perumal Jiyar, Periya tiru mudi adaivu by Kovil Kandadai Appan, Yatindra Pranava Prabavam by Pillai Lokam Jeeyar, commentaries on Divya Prabandam, Guru Parampara (lineage of Gurus) texts, temple records and inscriptions give a detailed account of the Alvars and their works. According to these texts, the saints were considered incarnations of some form of Vishnu. Poigai is considered an incarnation of Panchajanya (Krishna's conch), Bhootham of Kaumodakee (Vishnu's Mace/Club), Pey of Nandaka (Vishnu's sword), Bhaktisara of Sudarshana (Vishnu's discus), Nammalvar of Vishvaksena (Vishnu's commander), Madhurakavi of Vainatheya (Vishnu's eagle, Garuda), Kulasekhara of Kaustubha (Vishnu's necklace), Periy of Garuda (Vishnu's eagle), Andal of Bhudevi (Vishnu's wife, Lakshmi, in her form as Bhudevi), Thondaradippodi of Vanamaalai (Vishnu's garland), Thiruppaanaazhvar of Srivatsa (An auspicious mark on Vishnu's chest) and Thirumangai of Saranga (Rama's bow). The songs of Prabandam are regularly sung in all the Vishnu temples of South India daily and also during festivals.

According to traditional account by Manavala Mamunigal, the first three Alvars namely Poigai, Bhoothath and Pey belong to Dvapara Yuga (before 4200 BC). It is widely accepted by tradition and historians that the trio are the earliest among the twelve Alvars. Along with the three Saiva nayanmars, they influenced the ruling Pallava kings, creating a Bhakti movement that resulted in changing the religious geography from Buddhism and Jainism to these two sects of Hinduism in the region. The Alvars were also instrumental in promoting the Bhagavatha cult and the two epics of India, namely, Ramayana and Mahabaratha. The Alvars were instrumental in spreading Vaishnavism throughout the region. The verses of the various Alvars were compiled by Nathamuni (824-924 CE), a 10th-century Vaishnavite theologian, who called it the "Tamil Veda".

== Birth and early life ==
Thondaradippodi Alvar was born in a small village by name Thirumandangudi Chola region in Prabhava year, Margazhi month, Krishna chaturthi, Tuesday in Kettai (Jyestha) Nakshatram (star). His father ‘Veda Visaradhar’ belonged to "Kudumi Soliyap Brahmanar" community also called as "Vipra" people, whose routine work is to praise about Sri Vishnu. On the 12th day after his birth, he was named as "Vipra Narayanan". From an early age, bhakti towards Sri Vishnu was taught to him. He grew up with a well rounded personality. It is said that in spite of being good and beautiful and dedicated to Sri Vishnu bhakti, he had no conceit and treated all the aged persons and persons who are younger to him in the same way and gave proper respect to them.

As per Hindu legend, he was under the influence of a prostitute, whose mother stole all the money of Vipra Narayanan..When he was need of money, Vishnu came to his rescue and showered gold on him. He became a staunch devotee of Ranganatha of Sriranganathaswamy temple. He constructed a big Nandhavanam (flower park) in Srirangam, where various beautiful and fragrance flower plants are grown. He worshipped all the bhaktas of Sri Vishnu and sang songs in praise of Sri Ranganathar. From then, he was called as "Thondaradipodi Alwar".

== Literary works ==
He composed Tirumalai, comprising 45 verses and Tirupalliyeḻuchi comprising 10 verses. The verses of Tirupallieluchi are sung for waking up Rangantha, with the verses beginning with "votary bearing the dust of the god's feet". All his verses are in praise of Ranganatha, the presiding deity of the Srirangam Ranganathaswamy temple. Thondaradipodi vehemently opposes the caste system prevalent during his times and mentions that the ultimate way to reach Vishnu is through service to him and his devotees. He believed that Ranganatha is none other than Krishna himself and he has captured his soul. He uses the phrase "Prospering indolents" in his 38th verse meaning the devotees of Vishnu who left their corporal body in earth, but merged their soul to god. His verse starting with "Pachaimamalai pol meni" is the most popular verse and commonly chanted in all Vishnu temples during day-to-day worship and during festivals. The verses of Tirupalliyeḻuchi was first sung in the Srirangam temple and the Alvar gives Ranganatha a wake-up call describing how the inmates of earth come here to watch Ranganatha rise at dawn.

== Culture ==
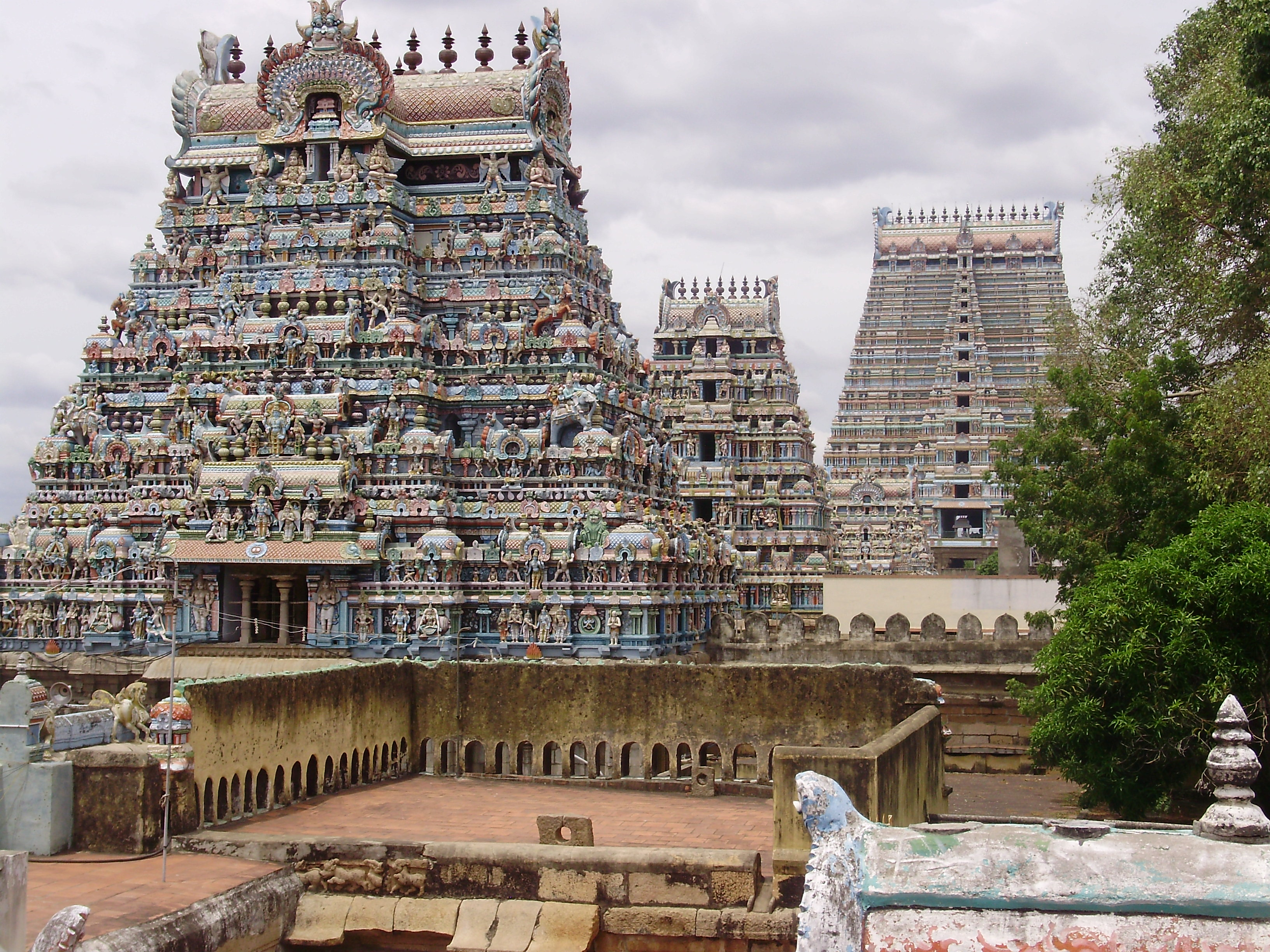
Image of Srirangam Ranganathaswamy temple in Srirangam

The birthday of the Alvar is celebrated twice in a year in the Srirangam temple during the birth star in the Tamil month of Margazhi. The Vasantha utsavam is a nine-day festival celebrated during the Tamil month of Vaikasi (May–June) when Ranganatha, the presiding deity of the temple enjoys the ambience of the garden created by the Alvar. As per a Hindu legend, Thirumangai Alvar, who built the surrounding walls of the Srirangam temple, left the garden untouched, though it blocked the path of the wall. Spring signifies a period that brings cool breeze in the evenings and new flowers blossom. As per Hindu legend, when Jothista Homam, a penance, when done during the period, helps devotees attain moksha. It is believed that one devotees are liberated from his curse if they drink the sacred water of Vishnu during the festival. During the mid of 15th century during the Vijayanagara rule, the Vasantha Mandapam was built inside the garden for the festive image to spend the evenings during the festival. Every evening during the festival, the festival image of Ranganatha is brought to the garden. In earlier centuries, the Devadasi Community in Srirangam, offered dance performance in front of the festive images of the temple in the Vasantha Mandapam during the festival. The practise is discontinued in the temple, but a practise is still continued at the Puri Jagannath temple. Vasanthotsavam is one of the three festivals of the temple when Ranganathar goes back to his sanctum led by the a set of men singing Divya Prabhandam and also makes a pass by through the Ranganayagi shrine. During the festival, the festival image of Ranganatha is taken in a procession on a horse mount around the four Chitirai streets of Srirangam. A special ablution performed for the festive image at the Vasantha Mandapam concludes the festival.

== Mangalasasanam ==
There are 58 of his paasurams in the 4000 Divya Prabhandham. He has sung in praise of six temples.

| S.No. | Name of the temple | Location | Photo | Number of Pasurams | Presiding deity | Notes/Beliefs |
|---|---|---|---|---|---|---|
| 1 | Srirangam. | Srirangam, Trichy district Tamil Nadu; 10.8625°N 78.689722°E | | 55 | Ranganayagi; Ranganathar (Periya Perumal) | Srirangam temple is often listed as the largest functioning Hindu temple in the world, the still larger Angkor Wat being the largest existing temple. The temple occupies an area of 156 acres (631,000 m^{2}) with a perimeter of 4,116m (10,710 feet) making it the largest temple in India and one of the largest religious complexes in the world. The annual 21-day festival conducted during the Tamil month of Margazhi (December–January) attracts 1 million visitors. |
| 2 | Thiruparkadal | Heavenly | Kurma | 1 | Lakshmi; Vishnu | In Hindu cosmology, Thiruparkadal (Ocean of milk) is the fifth from the center of the seven oceans. It surrounds the continent known as Krauncha. According to Hindu mythology, the devas (gods) and asuras (demons) worked together for a millennium to churn the ocean and release Amrita the nectar of immortal life. It is spoken of in the Samudra manthana chapter of the Puranas, a body of ancient Hindu legends. It is also the place where Vishnu reclines over Shesha Naga, along with his consort Lakshmi. |
| 3 | Ram Janmabhoomi | 26.7956°N 82.1943°E | | 1 | Seetha; Ram | Ram Janmabhoomi is the site in Ayodhya, Uttar Pradesh, held across the Hindu tradition to be the birthplace of Rama, seventh avatar of Vishnu. The Valmiki Ramayana (Bala Kanda, Sarga 5) locates this birthplace in Ayodhya on the banks of the Sarayu — a belief that has sustained continuous pilgrimage to the city for centuries. The Babri Masjid, built in 1528 CE by Mir Baqi under Babur, stood at this site until its demolition in 1992. Hindu veneration of the spot predates common assumptions: British merchant William Finch documented pilgrimages to "Ramchandra's castle" in Ayodhya as early as 1608–11, and the Mughal chronicle Ain-i-Akbari (c. 1590) already described the city's sacred character in relation to Rama. Court-ordered excavations by the Archaeological Survey of India in 2003 found beneath the mosque's foundations the structural remains of a large pre-existing Hindu temple, including fifty pillar bases and temple-specific architectural elements.In 2019, a unanimous five-judge bench of the Supreme Court of India held that Hindu faith in the site "has continued over centuries," confirmed the ASI's finding of a pre-existing non-Islamic structure, and awarded the land for temple construction. |
| 4 | Govardana | 27.504748°N 77.669754°E | Kurma | 1 | Radha; Krishna | The temple in Mathura, is among the most sacred of Hindu sites, and is revered as the birthplace of Krishna. Kehsav Dev (Krishna) is the deity of this temple. According to traditions, the original deity was installed by Bajranabh, who was great-grandson of Krishna. |
