= Amalanatipiran =

Work of Tamil Hindu literature

- ← Tirupalliyeḻuchi Kanninun Cirutampu →
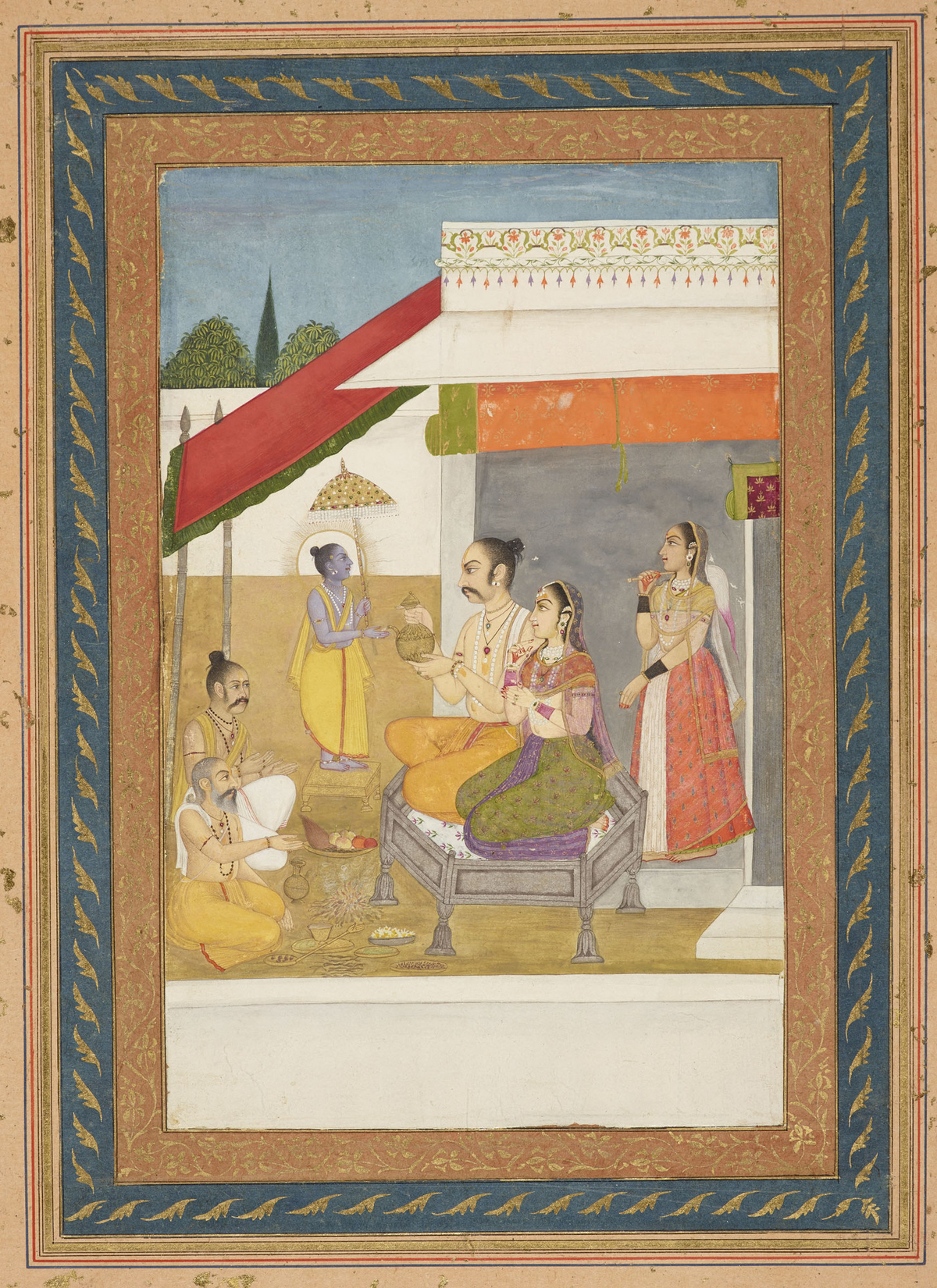
- 18th century painting of Vamana, Royal Collection (UK).

Information
- Religion: Hinduism
- Author: Tiruppan Alvar
- Language: Tamil
- Period: 9th–10th century CE
- Verses: 10

The Amalanatipiran (Tamil: அமலனாதிபிரான், romanized: Amalaṉātipirāṉ, lit. 'the unblemished first lord') is a work of Tamil Hindu literature written by Tiruppan Alvar, comprising ten hymns called pasurams. The title of this work is a reference to the unblemished and flawless nature of Vishnu. The work is part of the compendium of the hymns of the Alvars, known as the Nalayira Divya Prabandham.

== Legend ==
According to Sri Vaishnava tradition, Tiruppan Alvar was once singing the praises of Vishnu along the ghats of the river Kaveri, in front of the Ranganathaswamy temple in Srirangam. He was immersed in his chants of ecstasy to such an extent that he fell unconscious, alongside his veena. A temple-priest named Lokasaranga came across the poet-saint, returning to the temple with some water in a vessel, for the service of his temple's deity, Ranganatha. Finding the unconscious and presumably a man of a lower varna blocking his path, Lokasaranga called out to him thrice or four times, but the former did not stir. Losing his patience, the priest hurled a stone at him from a distance. Roused, Tiruppan Alvar realised that he had been obstructing the path of an attendant of Ranganatha, and ran away after begging the latter's forgiveness. When Lokasaranga reached the temple-gates, he found them barred from within. He observed that all the priests of the temple had assembled outside the gates, and found them as bewildered as he was. The customary period of the abhishekam ceremony of the temple's deity came and went, and the priests helplessly waited outside with wonder. Moved to tears, Lokasaranga prayed for a while, begging his deity to tell him what offence he had committed to be unable to serve him. A voice emerged from within the temple, proclaiming that the priest was unwelcome to the temple, as he had struck him with a stone. Puzzled, Lokasaranga enquired when he had performed such an act. The voice told him that the unconscious man he had struck was one of his embodiments; the priest would only be allowed into the temple if he circumambulated the temple, carrying the man upon his shoulders while doing so. Lokasaranga rushed to locate Tiruppan Alvar, but the latter begged him to leave him be, citing his low birth. Thus, the priest forcibly carried the Alvar upon his shoulders and circumambulated the temple. Tiruppan Alvar was later shown the murti of Ranganatha in the temple sanctum, and the sight filled him with such awe that he composed and sang the ten hymns of the Amalanatipiran.

== Hymns ==
Topics in Tamil literature
Sangam Literature
Five Great Epics
Silappatikaram	Manimekalai
Civaka Cintamani	Valayapathi
Kundalakesi
Five Minor Epics
Neelakesi	Culamani
Naga Kumara Kaviyam	Udayana Kumara Kaviyam
Yashodhara Kaviyam
Bhakti Literature
Naalayira Divya Prabandham	Kamba Ramayanam
Tevaram	Tirumurai
Tamil people
Sangam	Sangam landscape
Tamil history from Sangam literature	Ancient Tamil music

The first hymn of this work, which begins by explaining the title of this work, is as follows:

The perfect-first-lord is the radiant king of the celestials and resident of Venkatam surrounded by fragrant groves. His golden rule is just and unblemished. He made me a slave of his devotees. He is the lord of Arangam surrounded by lofty walls. O, his auspicious lotus feet have come to stay in my eyes!

— Amalanatipiran, Hymn 1

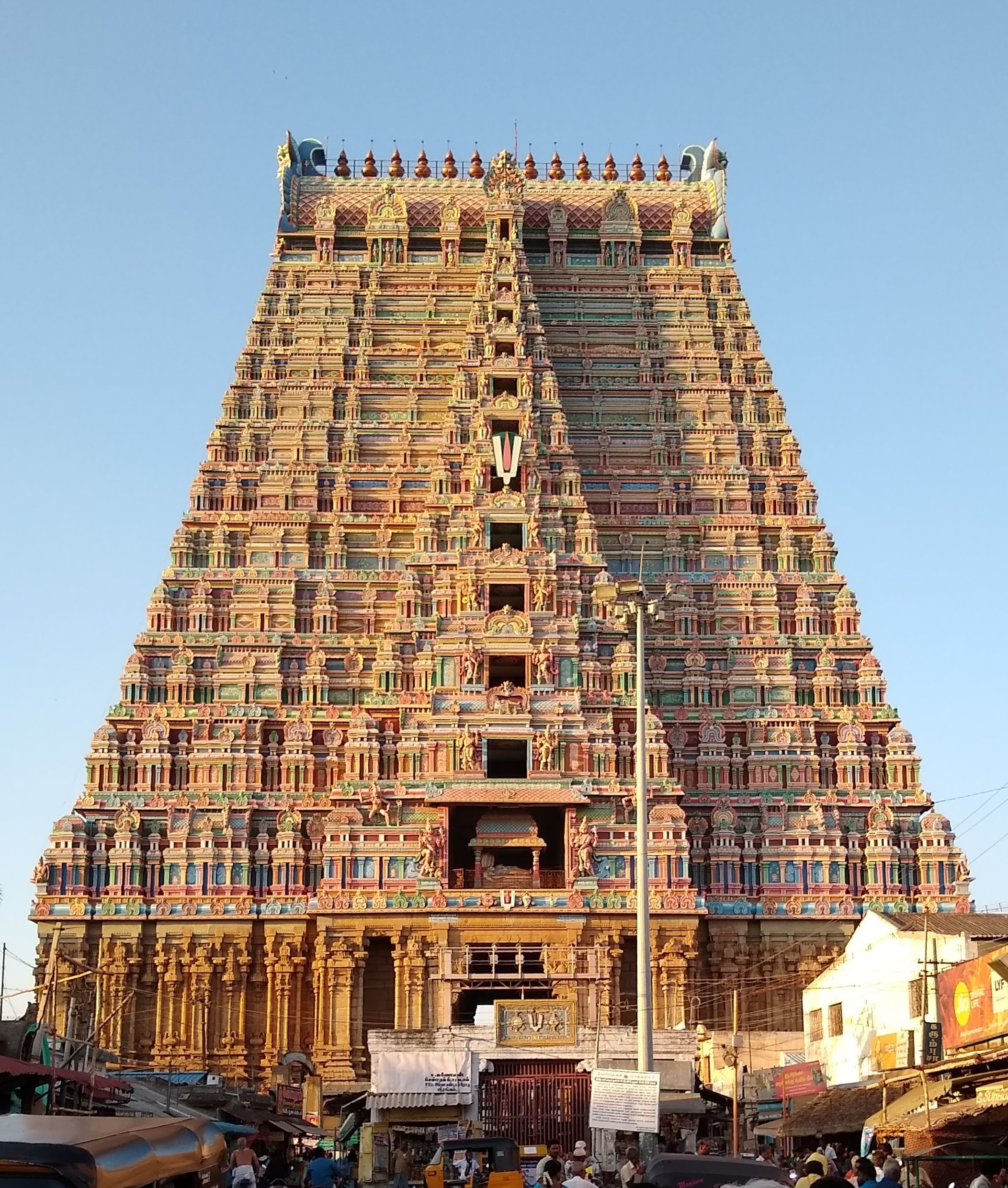
Ranganathaswamy Temple, Srirangam, the temple described in the first hymn

The second hymn references the deity's avataras (incarnations) of Vamana and Rama:

With glee in his heart, he measured the Earth, his crown touched the roof of the Universe. He is the Kakuthstha lord Rama, who rained arrows and killed the Rakshasa clan. He is the lord of Arangam surrounded by fragrant groves. My mind hovers over the red vestures on his dark frame!

— Amalanatipiran, Hymn 2

== See also ==
- Tirumālai
- Perumal Tirumoli
- Tirupalliyeḻuchi
