= Azhagiya Manavala Perumal Temple =

Perumal temple in Tiruchirappalli district, Tamil Nadu, India

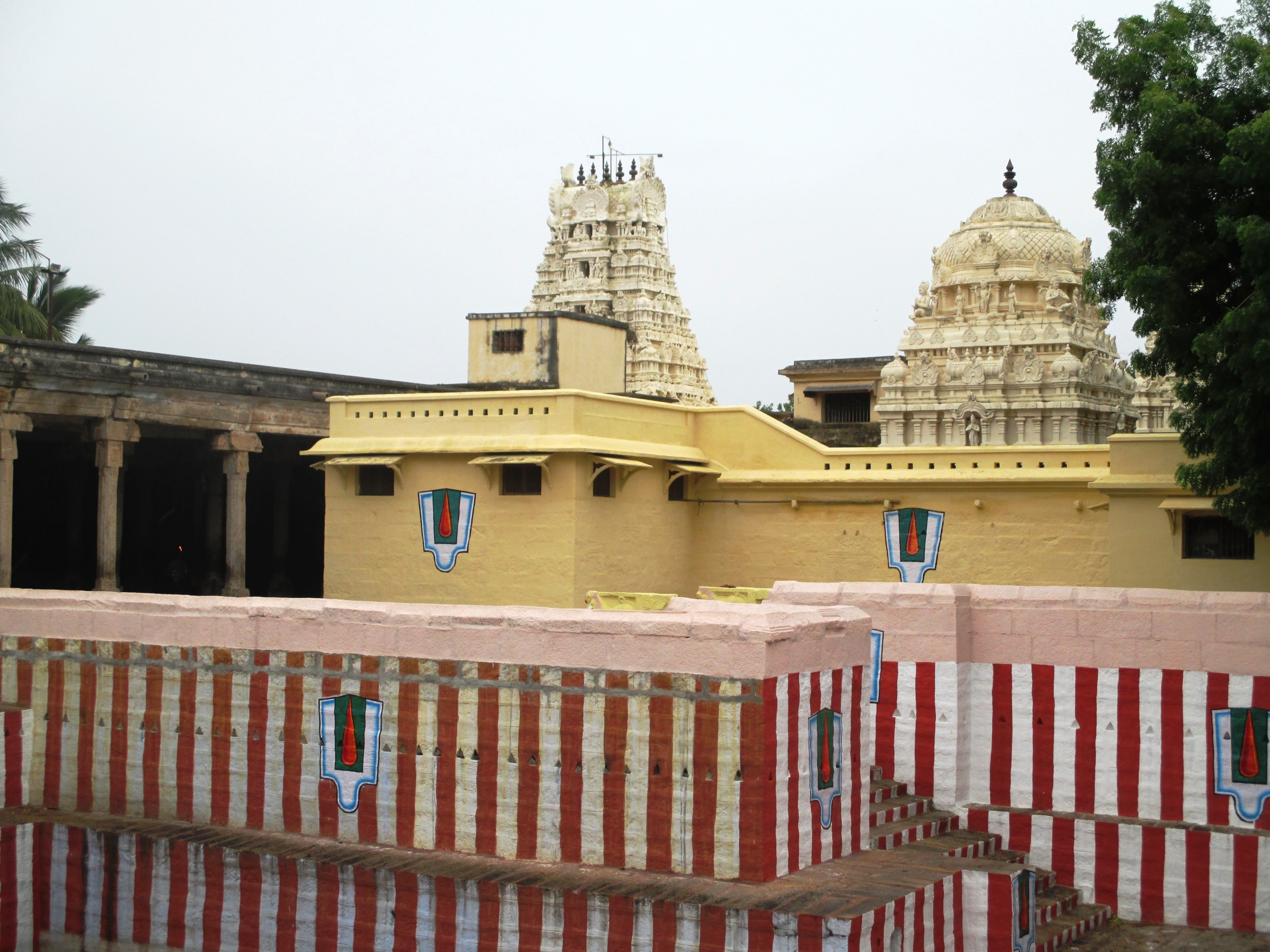

- Location in Tamil Nadu

Religion
- Affiliation: Hinduism
- District: Tiruchirapalli
- Deity: Azhagiya Manavala Perumal (Vishnu); Kamalavalli Nachiyar (Lakshmi)

Location
- Location: Uraiyur
- State: Tamil Nadu
- Country: India
- Coordinates: 10.8269°N 78.6734°E

Architecture
- Type: Dravidian architecture
- Creator: Cholas

Azhagiya Manavalan Perumal Temple (also called Thirukozhi or Nachiyar Koil) in Uraiyur, a suburb Tiruchirappalli in the south Indian state of Tamil Nadu, is dedicated to the Hindu God Azhagiya Manavalan (Vishnu) and Goddess Kamalavalli (Lakshmi). Constructed in the Dravidian style of architecture, the temple is glorified in the Divya Prabandha, the early medieval Tamil canon of the Alvar saints from the 6th–9th centuries CE. It is one of the 108 Divyadesam dedicated to Lakshmi Narayana.

The temple is believed to have been built by the Medieval Cholas of the late 8th century CE, with later contributions from later Pandyas, Vijayanagar kings and Madurai Nayaks. As per Hindu legend, Azhagiya Manavalan appeared to Kamalavalli, the daughter of Chola king Nanda Cholan, in this place to marry her.

A granite wall surrounds the temple, enclosing all its shrines and bodies of water. The temple has a five-tiered rajagopuram, the temple's gateway tower. Six daily rituals and three yearly festivals are held at the temple, of which the chariot festival, celebrated during the Tamil month of Chittirai (March–April), is the most prominent. The temple is maintained and administered by the Hindu Religious and Endowment Board of the Government of Tamil Nadu.

== Legend ==
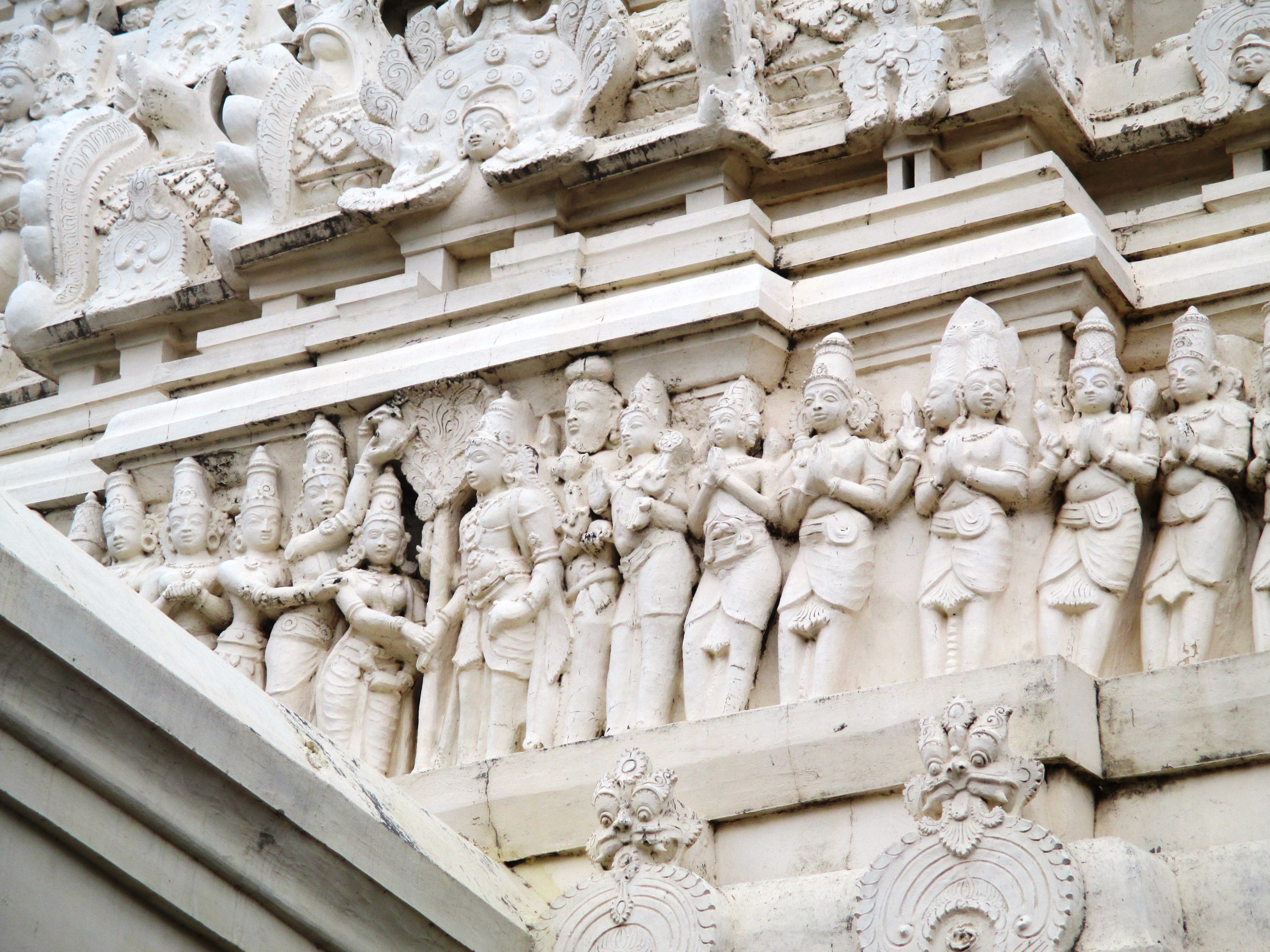
Legend of Nachiyar's marriage to Azhagiya Manavalar

As per Hindu legend, the god Vishnu was pleased by the worship of the childless Chola king Nanda Chola. He blessed the king with a child that was an incarnate of Lakshmi, his consort. The king found the child in a 1000 petal lotus tank while hunting in a forest. Since the child was born out of lotus, she was named Kamalavalli by the king. Time came when Kamalavalli fell in love with Vishnu in the form of Ranganatha, the presiding deity of Srirangam Ranganathaswamy temple. The Chola king readily got her married to Ranganatha, who appeared here as the groom. Since Vishnu appeared as Azhagiya Manavalan, meaning a beautiful groom, the temple built here is called Azhagiya Manavalan Temple. The event is celebrated as Serthi Sevai festival every year.

As per another legend, a fowl (called kozhi in Tamil) and an elephant fought at this place, with the fowl victorious. Since the fowl won, the place came to be known as Kozhiyur. It has another name Nichulapuri. The temple is also believed to be the place where King Ravivarmaraja worshiped the presiding deity.

== History ==
The temple is believed to be in existence much before the 7th century. The temple is maintained and administered by the Hindu Religious and Endowment Board of the Government of Tamil Nadu. An Executive officer appointed by the Board manages the temple along with Srirangam Ranganathaswamy temple, Pundarikakshan Perumal Temple at Thiruvellarai, Sri Vadivazhagiya Nambi Perumal Temple and Mariamman Temple at Anbil. Annadhanam scheme, which provides free food to devotees, is implemented in the temple by the Board. Under the scheme, free food is offered to hundred devotees every day in the temple and the expenditure is fully funded by the contributions from devotees.

== Architecture ==
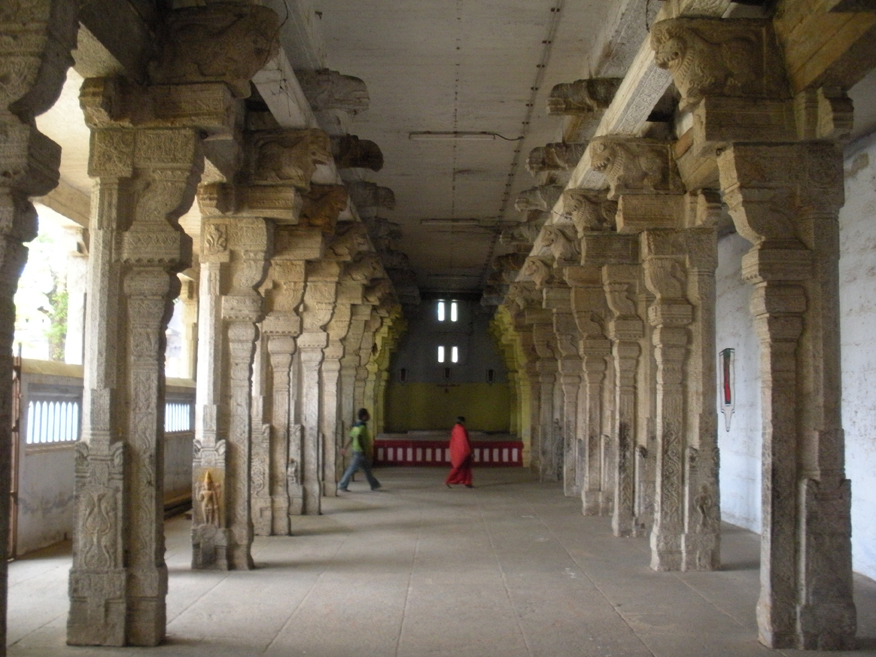
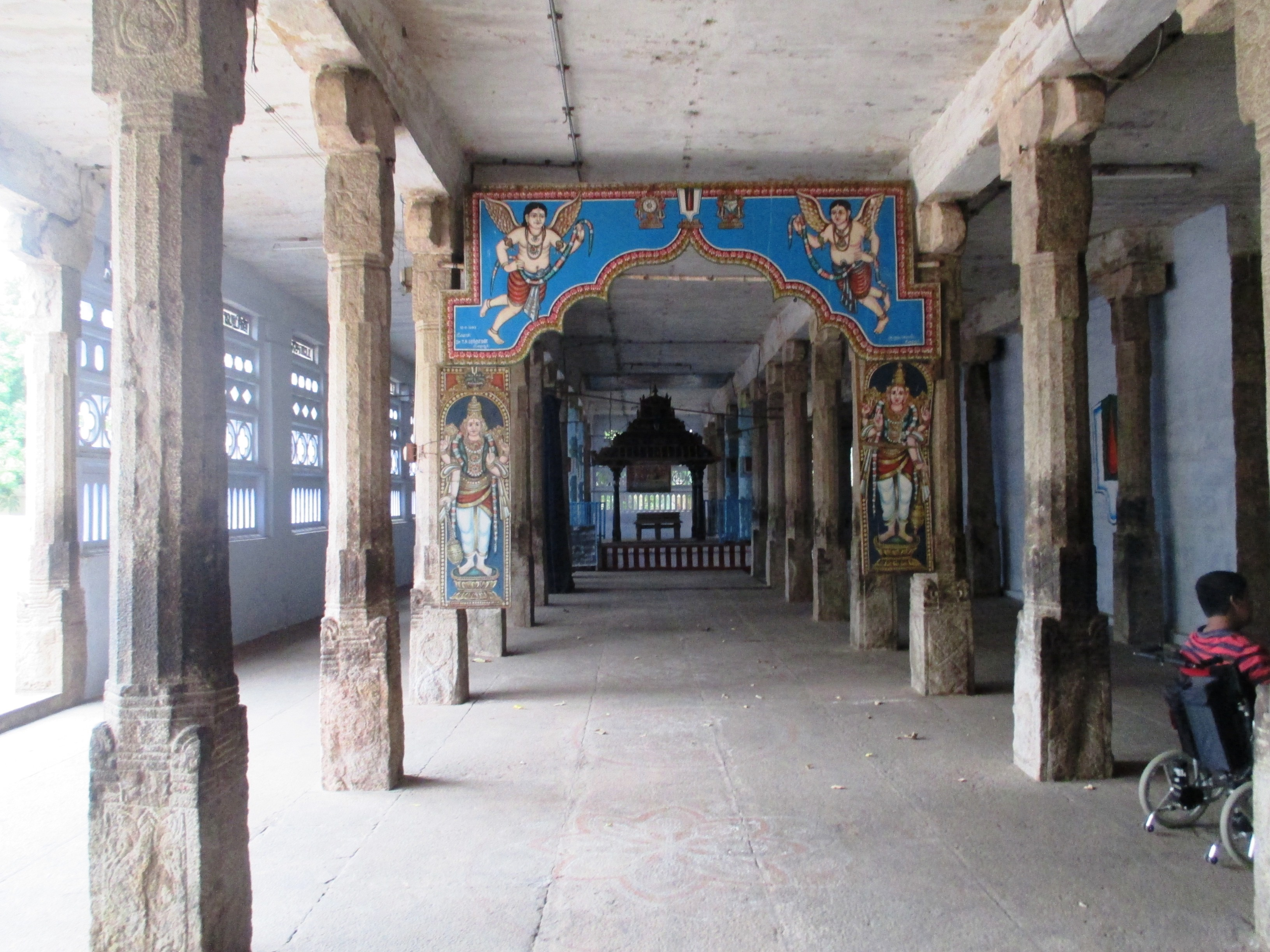
Pillared halls in the temple

The temple has a five-tiered rajagopuram (gateway tower). The vimana, is called Kamala Vimanam. The central shrine has the image of Vishnu as Azhagiya Perumal in sitting posture. The shrine of the goddess Kamalavalli Nachiyar faces North and it is the only divyadesam where the presiding goddess has a north-facing shrine. There are separate shrines for the saints Ramanuja and Nammalvar. There are paintings on the inner walls of the shrine of the Alvar saint Nammalvar. The temples were painted during the early 1800s and has images of Matsya and Narasimha avatars of Vishnu, Vaishnava Acharyas, Alvars, Vaishnavite mythology, the law of justice and dharma as enunciated by Ambarisha.

== Festivals and religious practices ==
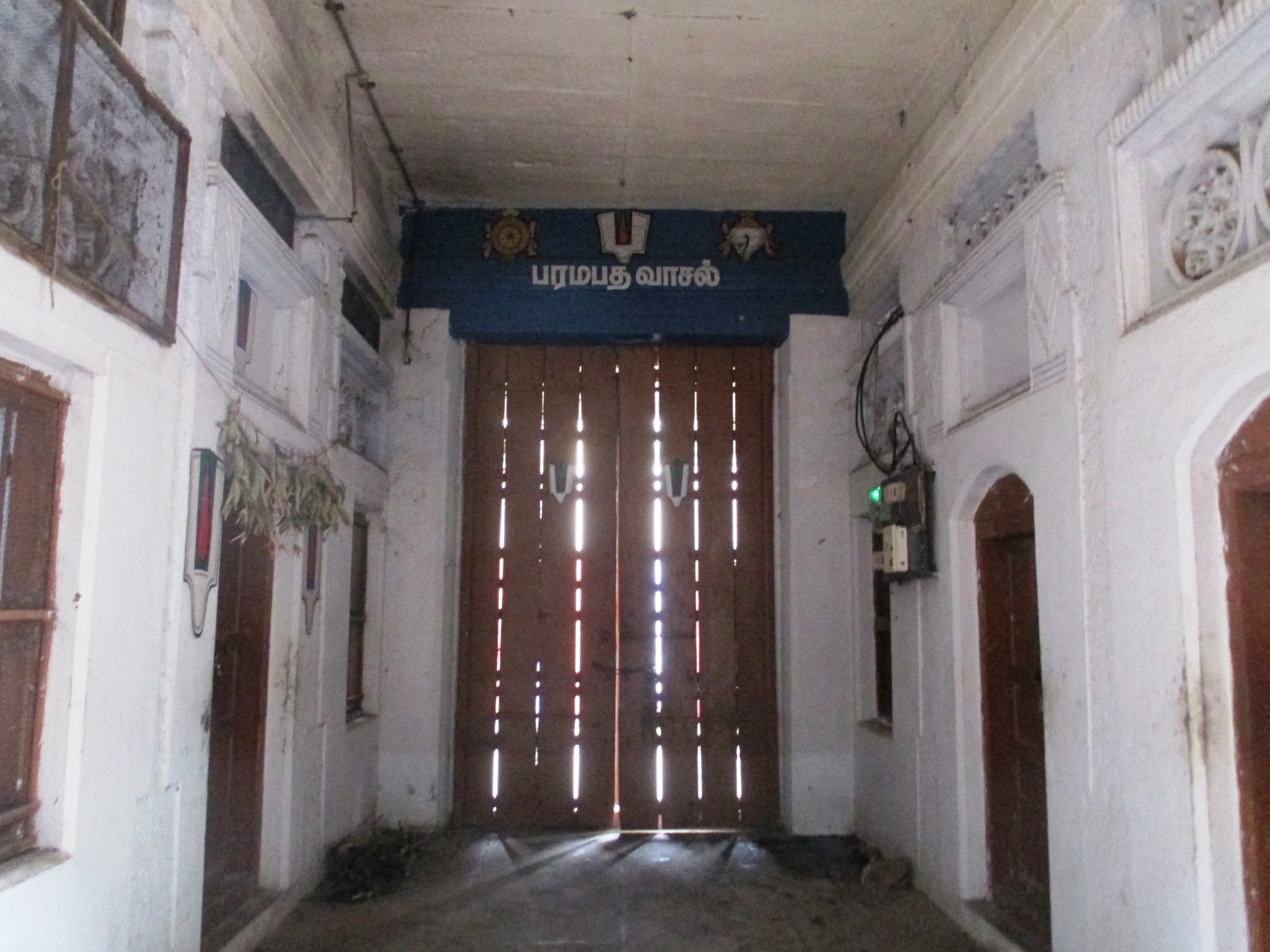
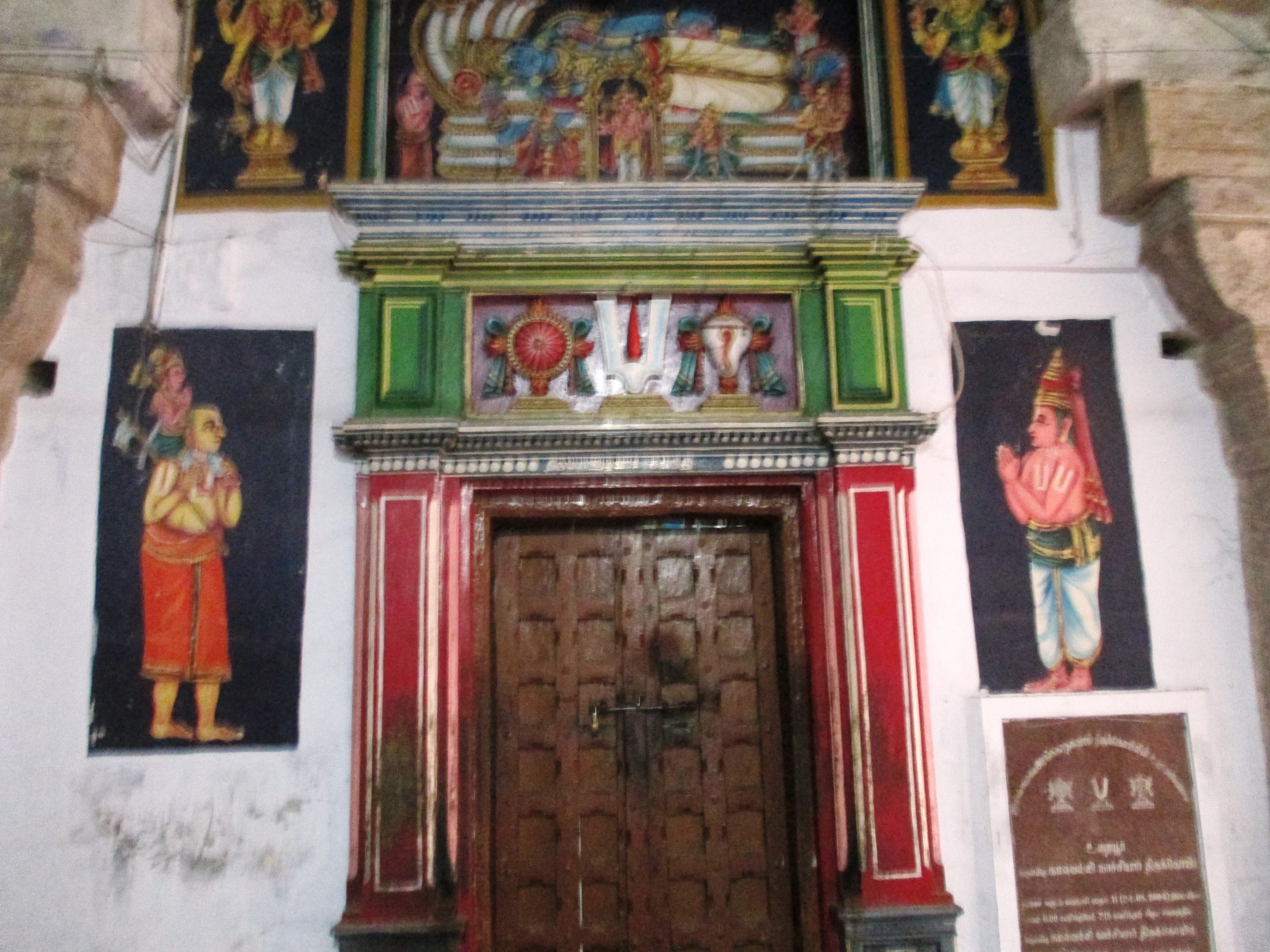
Paramapada Vasal and entrance of Tirupanazhwar shrine

The temple priests perform the pooja (rituals) during festivals and on a daily basis. As at other Vishnu temples of Tamil Nadu, the priests belong to the Vaishnavaite community, a Brahmin sub-caste. The temple rituals are performed six times a day: Ushathkalam at 7 a.m., Kalasanthi at 8:00 a.m., Uchikalam at 12:00 p.m., Sayarakshai at 6:00 p.m., Irandamkalam at 7:00 p.m. and Ardha Jamam at 8:00 p.m. Each ritual has three steps: alangaram (decoration), neivethanam (food offering) and deepa aradanai (waving of lamps) for both Azhagiya Manavalan and Kamalavalli. During the last step of worship, nagaswaram (pipe instrument) and tavil (percussion instrument) are played, religious instructions in the Vedas (sacred text) are recited by priests, and worshippers prostrate themselves in front of the temple mast. There are weekly, monthly and fortnightly rituals performed in the temple.

Serthi Sevai, the annual home coming festival is celebrated in the temple annually during the Ayilyam star in the Tamil month of Panguni. The festival is a part of the Panguni Uthiram festival of Srirangam Ranganathaswamy temple, when the festival idol of Srirangam temple, Namperumal, is brought to the Nachiyar temple and the images of Nachiyar and Namperumal are adorned in the Serthi hall of the temple. Special rituals are performed during the occasion. The other major festivals celebrated in the temple are Dolostava, Vasanthothsava (spring festival) and Navaratri.

The temple is believed to be the birthplace of Thiruppaan Alvar, one of the Alvar saints belonging to the 6th-8th centuries. In Srirangam Ranganthaswamy temple, a yearly birth festival of Thiruppaan is celebrated with Viswaroopa darshan of Ranganatha at the sanctum on the occasion of his birthday. The festive idol of Thiruppaan is taken from the temple to Srirangam. Thiruppaan is accorded with grand honours called "Keezha Padi Honours". A Parivattam (silk turban) is tied on the Alvar's head, adorned with a garland, a shawl is wrapped around his shoulders and sacred sandal paste is handed to him, all of which are believed to bring a smile on the face of the Alvar. An hour later, the image of the Alvar is taken to Nammalvar shrine and then to the goddess shrine, with the chanting of Nalayira Divya Prabandham with the verses of the Alvar's work Amalanaathipiraan. In the Azhagiya Manavala Perumal temple, a 10-day festival is celebrated in parallel that includes Araiyar sevai, Veda Paaraayanam (reciting of Vedas), special thirumanjanam (ablution) and procession inside the temple.

== Religious significance ==
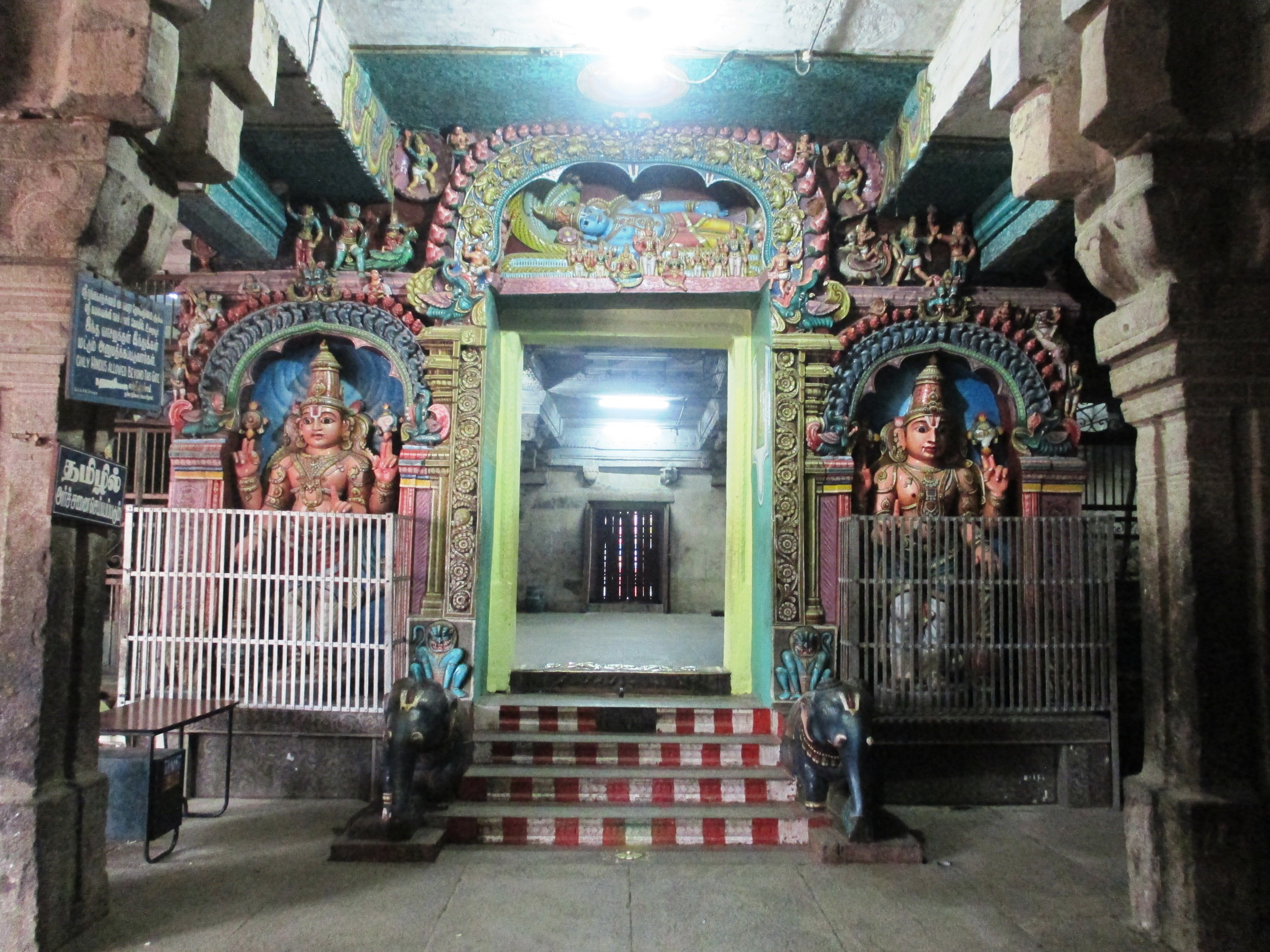
Entrance of the sanctum

The temple is revered in Nalayira Divya Prabandham, the 7th–9th century Vaishnava canon, by Kulasekara alvar in eleven hymns and Thirumangai Alvar in thirteen hymns. The temple is classified as a divyadesam, one of the 108 Vishnu temples that are mentioned in the book. The temple is counted as the second in the line of divyadesams after Srirangam Ranganathaswamy temple. The temple is one of the few divyadesams where the goddess has prominence over Vishnu. Some of the other temples where such female dominance is observed are Andal Temple at Srivilliputhur, Nachiyar Koil and Pundarikakshan Perumal Temple in Thiruvellarai. During all festive occasions, the first rights are reserved for Nachiyar, who moves ahead, while the god follows her. The food served to Nachiyar is prepared with pepper instead of chillies.
