= Tirupalliyeḻuchi =

Tamil Hindu work of literature

- ← Tirumālai Amalanatipiran →
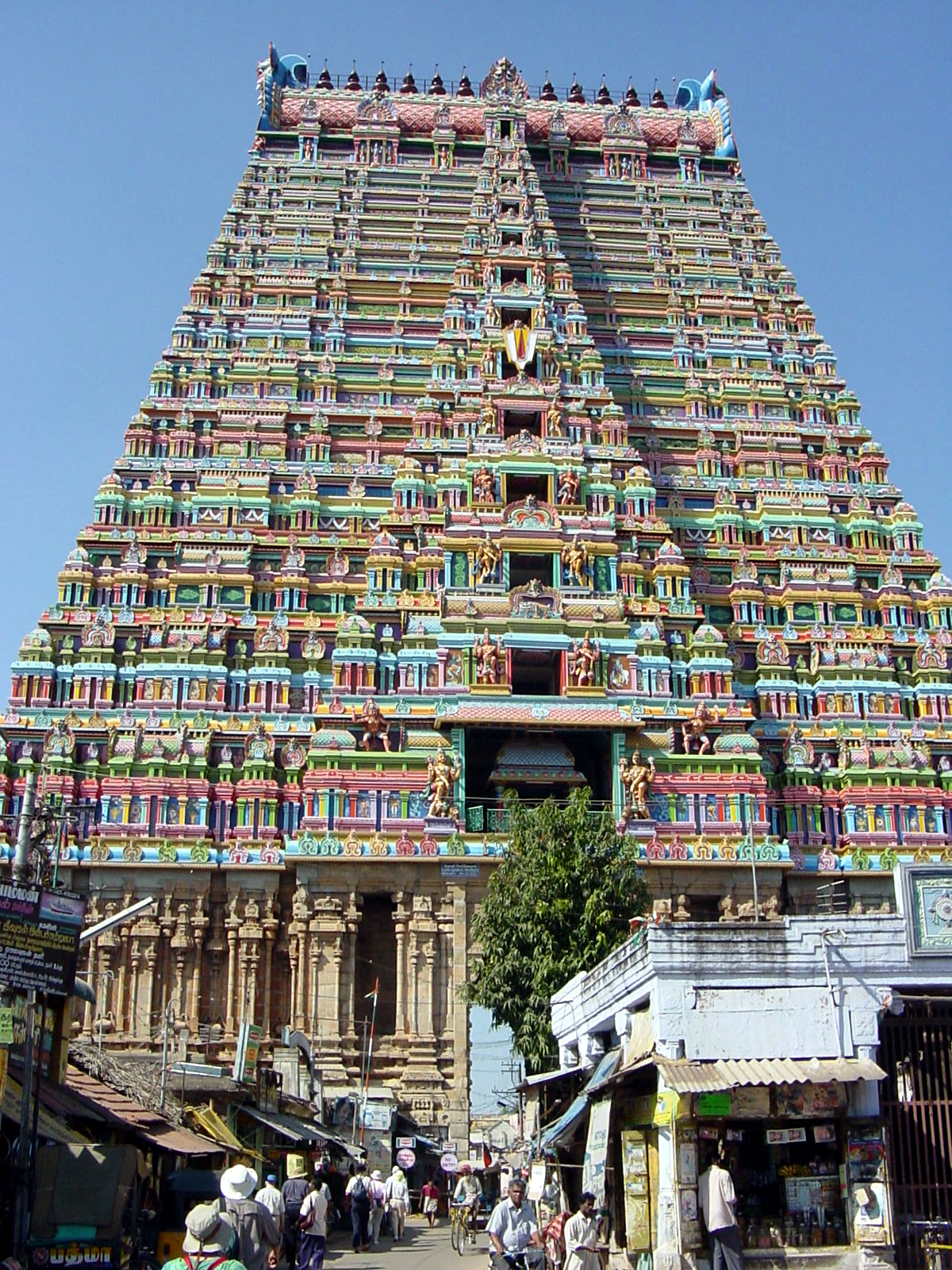
- Gopuram of the Ranganathaswamy Temple, Srirangam.

Information
- Religion: Hinduism
- Author: Tondaradippodi Alvar
- Language: Tamil
- Period: 9th–10th century CE
- Verses: 10

The Tirupalliyeḻuchi (Tamil: திருப்பள்ளியெழுச்சி, romanized: Tirupaḷḷiyeḻucci, lit. 'the rousing of the sacred temple'), also rendered Tirupalli Eluchi, is a work of Tamil Hindu literature written by Tondaradippodi Alvar, comprising ten hymns. The title of this work is a reference to the act of Suprabhatam, a Sri Vaishnava ritual, the prayer at dawn that is believed to rouse Vishnu from his sleep and protect the world. The work is part of the compendium of the hymns of the Alvars, known as the Nalayira Divya Prabandham.

Tirupalliyeḻuchi, as a ritual, is performed prominently throughout the month of Margaḻi in the Vishnu temples of South India.

== Hymns ==
The first hymn of this work begins as follows:

The sun has risen over the Eastern horizon destroying the darkness. Flowers have blossomed in great numbers. Found rushing towards Your sanctum are Kings and devatas (gods). The elephants on whose back they arrived, and kettledrums are making thundering sounds resembling roar of the sea. Please do wake up, O Lord of Arangam!

— Tirupalliyeḻuchi, Hymn 1

The fourth hymn makes references to the avataras of Rama and Krishna:

The sounds of the cowherd's flute and the bells of the cattle blend and spread everywhere. In the fields the bumble bees are swarming. O Lord of celestials who destroyed the Lanka clan with a bow and stood guard over the seers’ sacrifice! O Lord, Ayodhya’s coronated king! O Lord of Arangam, my Liege, pray wake up.

— Tirupalliyeḻuchi, Hymn 4

== See also ==
Topics in Tamil literature
Sangam Literature
Five Great Epics
Silappatikaram	Manimekalai
Civaka Cintamani	Valayapathi
Kundalakesi
Five Minor Epics
Neelakesi	Culamani
Naga Kumara Kaviyam	Udayana Kumara Kaviyam
Yashodhara Kaviyam
Bhakti Literature
Naalayira Divya Prabandham	Kamba Ramayanam
Tevaram	Tirumurai
Tamil people
Sangam	Sangam landscape
Tamil history from Sangam literature	Ancient Tamil music

- Tirupallantu
- Tiruvaymoli
- Amalanatipiran
