= Tirumālai =

Tamil Hindu work of literature

- ← Tiruchanda Viruttam Tirupalliyeḻuchi →
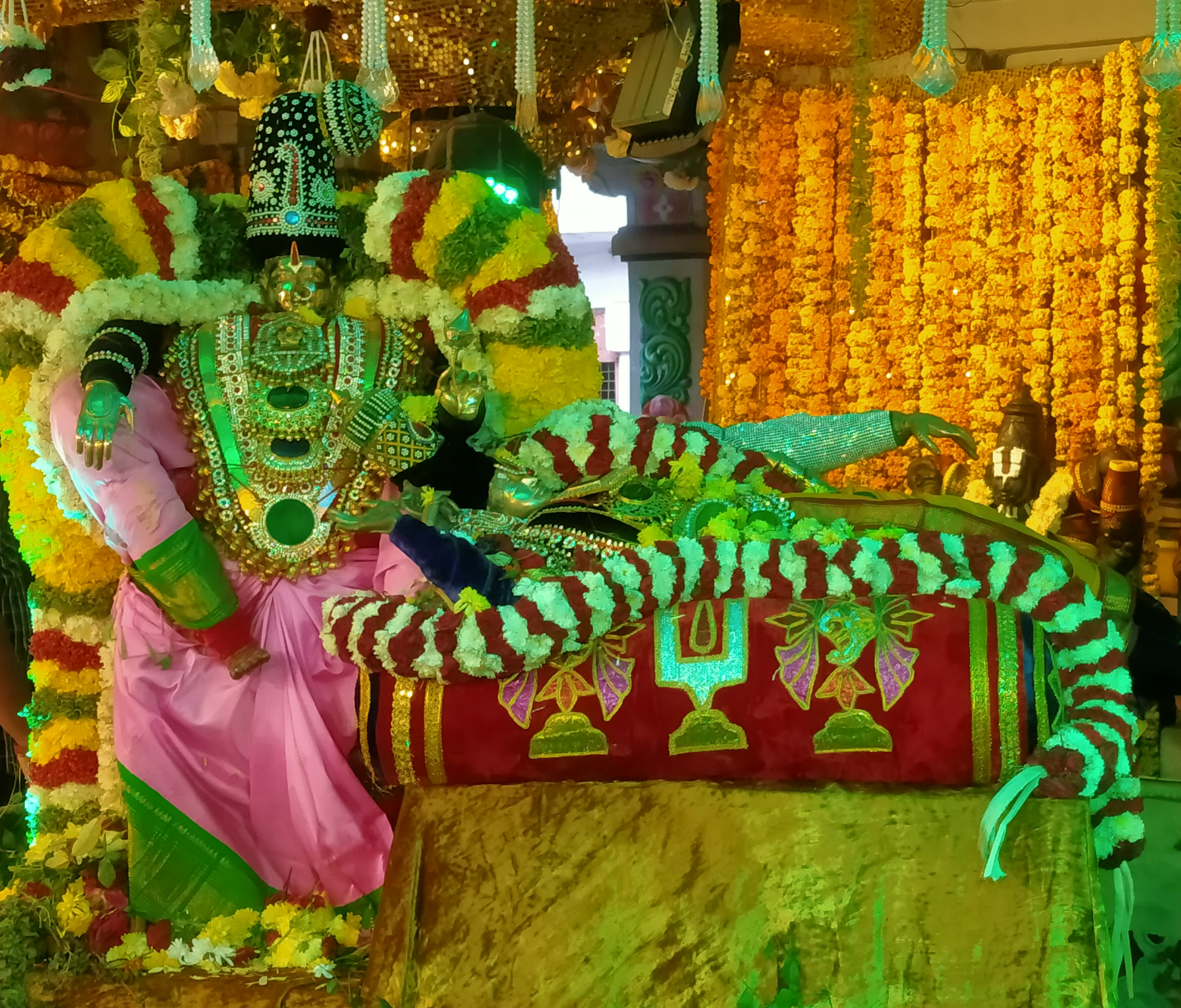
- Murti of Ranganatha adorned with garlands.

Information
- Religion: Hinduism
- Author: Tondaradippodi Alvar
- Language: Tamil
- Period: 9th–10th century CE
- Verses: 45

The Tirumālai (Tamil: திருமாலை, lit. 'sacred garland') is a work of Tamil Hindu literature written by Tondaradippodi Alvar, comprising 45 verses. Each of these verses is regarded in popular tradition to be a flower, woven together to produce a garland for Ranganatha, a form of the deity Vishnu. It is part of the compendium of the hymns of the Alvars, the Nalayira Divya Prabandham. The verses of this work are often existential and indicative of regret, reflecting the sorrow of the author for not having spent more of time in the veneration of his deity, wondering if salvation lies ahead of him.

== Hymns ==
The first two hymns of this work extol the deity and his abode of Srirangam:

You, the very cause of this world who creates and swallows the Universe, the Lord of Srirangam. We have overcome the sins from beginningless time and heralding the same, we walk freely on the heads of Yama's henchmen.

— Tirumālai, Hymn 1

O Lord of Srirangam resembling a massive green mountain, with coral lips, red eyes - if I were to be given in exchange of praising you thus the kingdom of Indra, I shall not take it.

— Tirumālai, Hymn 2

== See also ==
Topics in Tamil literature
Sangam Literature
Five Great Epics
Silappatikaram	Manimekalai
Civaka Cintamani	Valayapathi
Kundalakesi
Five Minor Epics
Neelakesi	Culamani
Naga Kumara Kaviyam	Udayana Kumara Kaviyam
Yashodhara Kaviyam
Bhakti Literature
Naalayira Divya Prabandham	Kamba Ramayanam
Tevaram	Tirumurai
Tamil people
Sangam	Sangam landscape
Tamil history from Sangam literature	Ancient Tamil music

- Tiruvaciriyam
- Tiruppavai
- Ramanuja Nutrantati
