= Tiruppan Alvar =

Poet-saint of Tamil Hindu tradition

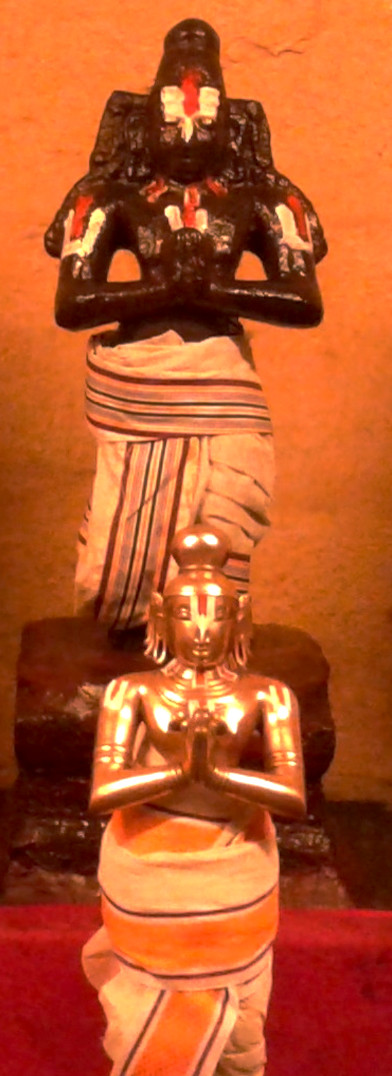
- Image of the granite and festival image of Tiruppan in Alwarthirunagari Temple

Personal life
- Born: November 20–21, 2760 BCE Uraiyur
- Notable work: Amalanatipiran

Religious life
- Religion: Hinduism
- Philosophy: Vaishnavism

Tiruppan Alvar (Tamil: திருப்பாணாழ்வார், romanized: Tiruppāṇ Āḻvār) was one of the twelve Alvars of South India, who were poet-saints known for their affiliation to the Sri Vaishnava tradition of Hinduism. The verses of the Alvars are compiled as the Naalayira Divya Prabandham and the 108 temples revered in the text are classified as Divya Desams. Tiruppan Alvar is considered the eleventh in the line of the twelve Alvars.

As per local traditions, he was born to a couple from the Panar community. Tiruppan Alvar is known for his affiliation to Ranganatha of the Srirangam Ranganathaswamy temple and is traditionally believed to have merged with the deity upon his demise.

The ten verses of Tiruppan Alvar are called the Amalanatipiran, and his contributions amount to ten verses among the 4000 stanzas in the Naalayira Divya Prabandam. The works of Tiruppan Alvar contributed to the philosophical and theological ideas of Vaishnavism.

In South Indian Vishnu temples, Tiruppan Alvar has images and festivals associated with him. The Tiruppan Alvar Avathara Utsavam is celebrated in Srirangam and for ten days in Alagiya Manavala Perumal Temple in Woraiyur/ The verses of Tiruppan Alvar and the other twelve Alvars are recited as a part of daily prayers and during festive occasions in several Vishnu temples in South India.

== Alvars ==
Though the word Alvar has traditionally been etymologized as from Tamil. 'Āḻ' (ஆழ்), 'to immerse oneself' as one who dives deep into the ocean of the countless attributes of god, a seminal research by the Indologist S. Palaniappan has established that this word is actually a corruption of the original inscriptionally attested pre-11th century 'Alvar' 'one who rules' or 'a great person' which should be compared with the epithet 'Āṇḍãḷ' (ஆண்டாள்) for the female canonized Vaishnava saint Kōtai (கோதை). Alvars are considered the twelve supreme devotees of Vishnu, who were instrumental in popularising Vaishnavism during the 5th to 8th centuries CE. The religious works of these saints in Tamil, songs of love and devotion, are compiled as Naalayira Divya Prabandham containing 4000 verses and the 108 temples revered in their songs are classified as Divya desam. The saints had different origins and belonged to different castes. As per tradition, the first three Alvars, Poigai, Bhutha and Pei were born miraculously. Tirumialisai was the son of a sage, Thondaradi, Mathurakavi, Peria and Andal were from the Brahmin community, Kulasekhara from Kshatriya community, Namm was from a cultivator family, Tiruppan from the ancient musical pāṇar community and Tirumangai from kaḷvar community. Divya Suri Saritra by Garuda-Vahana Pandita (11th century CE), Guruparamparaprabavam by Pinbaragiya Perumal Jiyar, Periya tiru mudi adaivu by Anbillai Kandadiappan, Yatindra Pranava Prabavam by Pillai Lokacharya, commentaries on Divya Prabandam, Guru Parampara (lineage of Gurus) texts, temple records and inscriptions give a detailed account of the Alvars and their works. According to these texts, the saints were considered incarnations of some form of Vishnu. Poigai is considered an incarnation of Panchajanya (Krishna's conch), Bhoothath of Kaumodakee (Vishnu's Mace/Club), Pey of Nandaka (Vishnu's sword), Thirumalisai of Sudarshanam (Vishnu's discus), Namm of Vishvaksena (Vishnu's commander), Madhurakavi of Vainatheya (Vishnu's eagle, Garuda), Kulasekhara of Kaustubha (Vishnu's necklace), Periy of Garuda (Vishnu's eagle), Andal of Bhudevi (Vishnu's wife, Lakshmi, in her form as Bhudevi), Thondaradippodi of Vanamaalai (Vishnu's garland), Tiruppan of Srivatsa (An auspicious mark on Vishnu's chest) and Thirumangai of Saranga (Rama's bow). The songs of Prabandam are regularly sung in all the Vishnu temples of South India daily and also during festivals.

According to traditional account by Manavala Mamunigal, the first three Alvars namely Poigai, Bhoothath and Pey belong to Dvapara Yuga (before 4200 BC). It is widely accepted by tradition and historians that the trio are the earliest among the twelve Alvars. Along with the three Saiva nayanmars, they influenced the ruling Pallava kings, creating a Bhakti movement that resulted in changing the religious geography from Buddhism and Jainism to these two sects of Hinduism in the region. The Alvars were also instrumental in promoting the Bhagavata cult and the two epics of India, namely, Ramayana and Mahabharatha. The Alvars were instrumental in spreading Vaishnavism throughout the region. The verses of the various Alvars were compiled by Nathamuni (824-924 CE), a 10th-century Vaishnavite theologian, who called it the "Tamil Veda".

== Early life ==
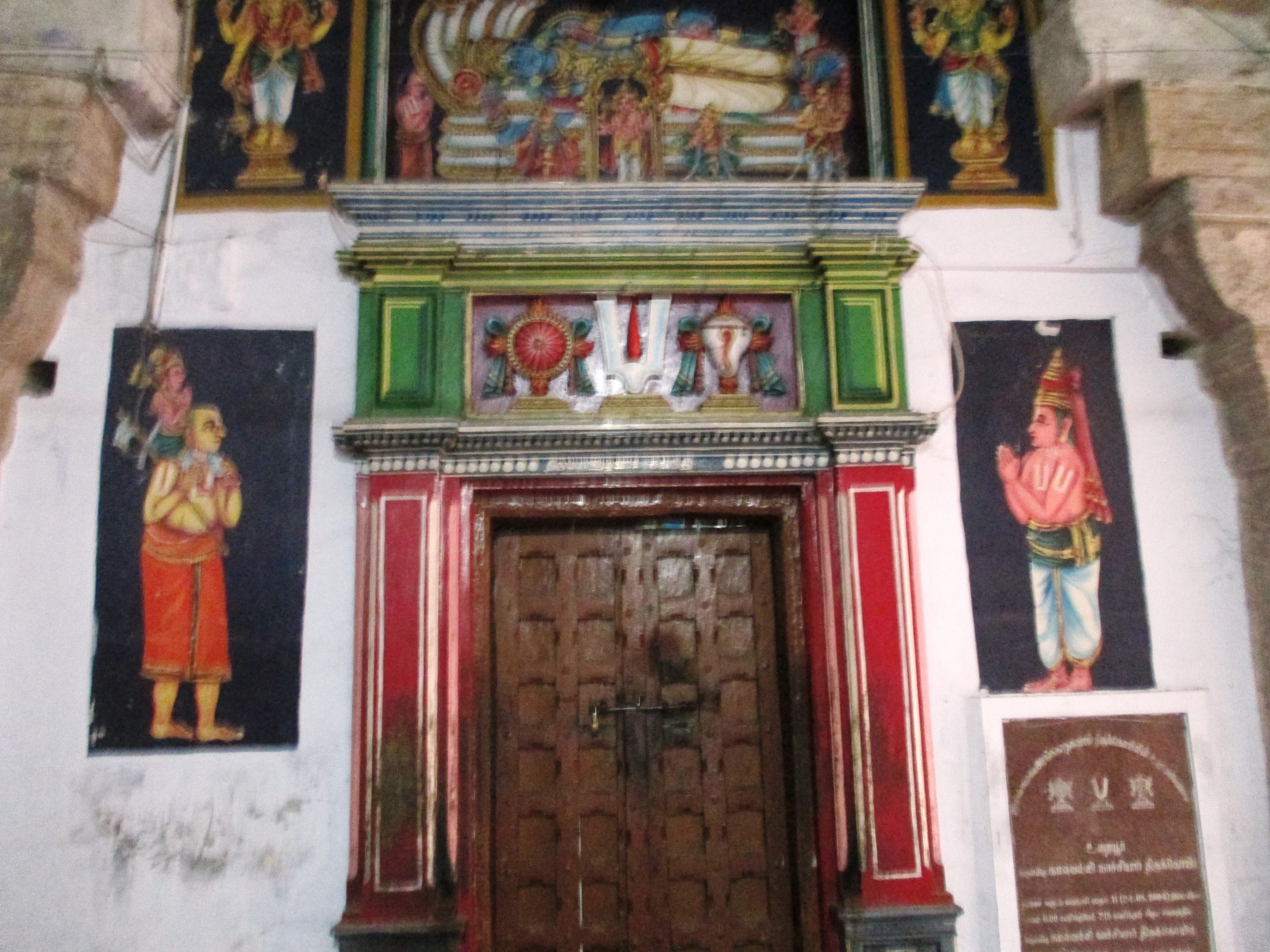
Shrine of Tiruppan Alvar in Sri Azhagiya Manavala Perumal Temple, believed to be his birthplace.

Tiruppan Alvar was born in Purthurmadhi year, Kaarthigai (Nov-Dec) month, on a Wednesday in the Rohini Nakshatra (star) in a small village of Alagapuri near Srirangam in the 8th or 9th century CE. Paanars are a community of musicians and traditional song makers who are capable of moving their audiences to states of ecstasy and bliss. While later traditional legends treat the Tamil Tiruppan community as outcastes historically they have never been outcastes or untouchables as established by Palaniappan. The community has traditionally been treated as untouchables by the Tamil hagiographical literature. In reality they have never been untouchable till today. In fact medieval inscriptions present evidence for their performing Sanskrit drama and for singing and training temple dancers in temples. As Palaniappan states therein: "What is interesting about the traditional views regarding the social status of the Pāṇars is that they were not informed by any real data on the Paṇars actually living in Tamil Nadu during medieval times. Such real data are indeed available to us from Tamil inscriptions, which present a drastically different picture of the social status of the Pāṇars".

It is believed that he is the amsam (form) of the small mark on Vishnu's chest (legend has it that all Alvars are avatars of some part of Vishnu), called the Srivatsam on the chest of Narayana.

Being a divine child, his instincts were heavenly and he grew as a man leaving all glamour of the world. Having a veena (string instrument) in his hand, he was always to be seen singing the glories of Vishnu. He was soon famous in and around these Tamil lands of Southern India. His skills as a bhakti (divine) musician and his abilities to express and invoke bhakti amongst his listeners, drew audiences from afar. He was soon to be known as "Tiruppan perumal". One of the strictures on outcastes was that they were not allowed to use some shores of Cauvery river, considered sacred and pure by the people of the region. Following this stricture, Paan Perumal did not come near the Kaveri river, but mostly stood alongside its banks facing the Srirangam temple and sang his praises to Ranganatha, the presiding deity of the temple. He believed that the conventions and spiritual sense specified by sastras lies in moral conduct.

== Legend of Amalanatipiran ==
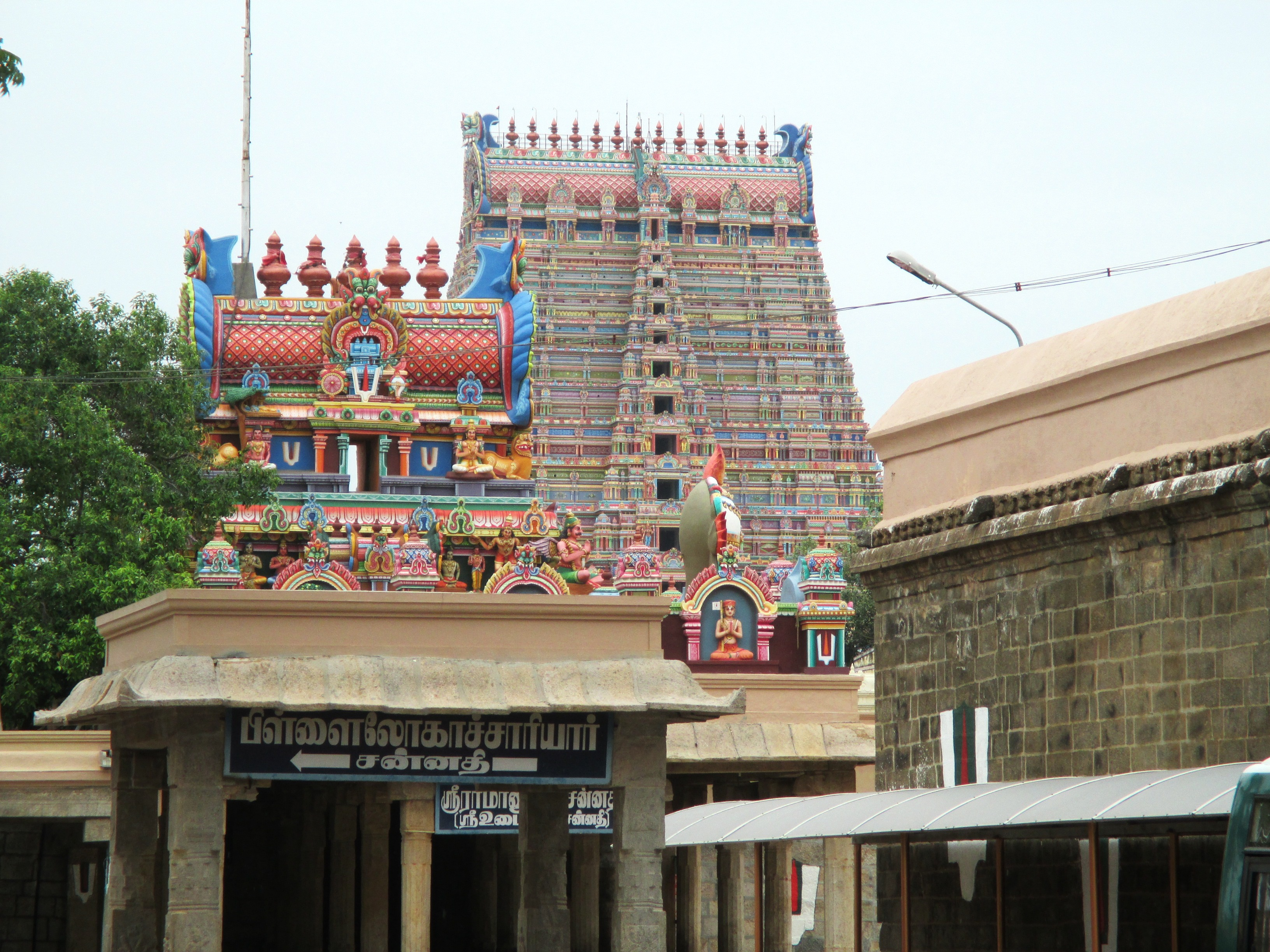
Srirangam Ranganathaswamy temple

According to regional legend, a sage by the name Loka Saranga came to the river Kaveri for drawing water for the temple. Tiruppan was in deep devotion and was unaware of his surroundings that he missed the voice of Saranga asking him to leave way. The sage threw a small stone in his direction to wake him, but the stone accidentally hit the forehead of Tiruppan and he started to bleed. Tiruppan realised what had happened and quietly retired. Unaware of the injury caused to Tiruppan, the sage returned to the temple. He was taken aback on seeing blood oozing out from the forehead of the image of Ranganatha. That very night, Vishnu appeared in the dream of Loka Saranga and commanded him to fetch Tiruppan to the temple the next morning in his shoulders. Accordingly, Loka Saranga requested Tiruppan to come to the temple. But, Tiruppan, referring to his lowly birth, declined to enter the holy place. When he was told of Vishnu's commandment, Tiruppan was beside himself and was lost in a deep trance. Loka Saranga said that if that were his objection, he could carry him on his shoulders to the temple. When they reached the sanctum, Tiruppan experienced the bliss of Ranganatha and composed the Amalanadhipiraan, a poem describing the beauty from the divine feet to the face of the Lord of Srirangam in ten verses, and ultimately laid his life at the feet of the deity. Thus, it also portrays how a devotee should pray at any temple starting to first look at the divine feet and be immersed in the Lord's presence. The poem is considered to be sweeter than even the sound of music of the veena.

== Works ==
The first pasuram (hymn) sung by this Alvar describes Arangan's feet. On seeing the thiruvadi (lotus feet) of Ranganatha, he sang:

Neel madhil Arangathamman thrukkamalpadham vandhu en Kanninullana okkinrathe.

He then started to see the whole thirumeni (body) of Ranganatha, and he sang a total of ten pasurams (hymns) which explain the beauty of Sri Ranganathar from his thiruvadi (foot) to thirumudi (head). He explains in his ten pasurams (hymns) about the clean saffron cloth which is worn on the body of Ranganathar, his jewels the thiru vayiru (stomach) from where Lord Brahma originated, the broad chest, the red lips and finally on explaining the beauty of the two broad eyes, he fell down. After some time, Tiruppan Alvar was not found and he went in to the body of Thiruvaranganathan. Like Andal, whose thoughts were always on Aranganathan, and was enraptured by the love of the Perumal, Tiruppan Alwar was also captured by this love and he became a part of the Lord along with his mortal sheath. He composed a total of ten pasurams, where he explains how a humans should lead their life. His principal purport in them is : "Perumal is the principal supreme entity and our aims and aspirations should be to attain Him through total surrender to him signified by our placing all of ourselves at his lotus feet".

One of the verses reads

Transliteration

Kondal vannanaik kovalanay venney
Unda vayan en ullam kavarndhanai
Andar kon ani arangan en amudhinaik
Kanda kangal marronarinaik kanave

Meaning

I have seen the One whose color is like dark rainclouds
He is the one with the mouth that swallowed the butter of cowherds,
He is the Lord of the devas,
He is Lord Ranganatha,
He is my nectar, my life!
My eyes have seen my Lord and will not see anything else!

== Commentary and interpretations ==
Tiruppan Alvar's ten verses Amalanatipiran and the Alvar's Bhagavad Anubhavam (experiences of the divine) moved many Vaishnava Acharyas (gurus). The ten verses are compiled in the sixth Prabhandam of the Mudalayiram of Divya Prabandha. Vedanta Desikan was moved by the composition of the Alvar, and wrote a commentary called Munivahana Bhogam in Sanskritized Tamil - Manipravalam. He also composed four verses in Tamil in his Prabhanda Saaram to elaborate on the significance of the contribution of the saint. He went on to compose a stotram (divine text) in Sanskrit known as Sri Bhagavad Dhyana Sobhanam. Vedanta Desikan was so moved by the ten verses of Amalanatipiran that he paid multiple tributes to the saint. Desikan was so overwhelmed by the profundity of the saint's Bhagavad Anubhavam that he declared the ten verse compendium to be the essence of countless Vedic texts.

== Significance ==
The devotees of the Sri Vaishnava sect of Hinduism accord veneration to the Alvars along with their worship of Vishnu. The verses of the Alvars are recited as a part of daily prayers and during festive occasions in several Vishnu temples in South India. There are shrines dedicated to the Alvars in several of the Vishnu temples in South India. In Srirangam's Ranganthaswamy temple, a yearly birth festival of Tiruppan Alvar is celebrated with the Vishvarupa darshana of Ranganatha at the sanctum on his birthday. The festive idol of Tiruppan Alvar is brought from his birthplace in Sri Alagiya Manavala Perumal Temple at modern day Woraiyur to Srirangam. Tiruppan is accorded with grand honours called "Keela Padi Honours". A Parivattam (silk turban) is tied on the Alvar's head, adorned with garland, shawl is wrapped around his shoulders and sacred sandal paste is handed to him, all of which are believed to bring a smile on the face of the Alvar. An hour later, the image of the Alvar is taken to Nammalvar shrine and then Thayar shrine, with the chanting of Naalayira Divya Prabandham with the verses of the Alvar's work, Amalanatipiran. In the Alagiya Manaval Perumal temple, a 10-day festival is celebrated that included Araiyar sevai, Veda Paaraayanam (reciting of Vedas), special thirumanjanam (ablution) and procession inside the temple.

== Venerated shrines ==
There are 13 of his pasurams in the 4000 Divya Prabhandham. He has sung in praise of three temples.

S.No.	Name of the temple	Location	Photo	Number of Pasurams	Presiding deity	Notes/Beliefs
1	Srirangam.	Srirangam, Trichy district Tamil Nadu; 10.8625°N 78.689722°E		10	Ranganayagi; Ranganathar (Periya Perumal)	Srirangam temple is often listed as the largest functioning Hindu temple in the world, the still larger Angkor Wat being the largest existing temple. The temple occupies an area of 156 acres (631,000 m^{2}) with a perimeter of 4,116m (10,710 feet) making it the largest temple in India and one of the largest religious complexes in the world. The annual 21-day festival conducted during the Tamil month of Margazhi (December–January) attracts 1 million visitors.
2	Paramapadam	Heavenly		1	Lakshmi; Vishnu	Vaikuntha is the celestial abode of Vishnu who is one of the principal deities of Hinduism and the supreme being in its Vaishnavism tradition. Vaikuntha is an abode exclusive to him, his consort the goddess Lakshmi and other liberated souls that have gained moksha. They are blessed with pure bliss and happiness in the company of the supreme being for all eternity.
3	Tirupati	13.143°N 79.907°E		2	Alamelumanga; Venkateswara	Venkateswara Temple is a landmark Vaishnavite temple situated in the hill town of Tirumala at Tirupati in Chittoor district of Andhra Pradesh, India. The Temple is dedicated to Lord Sri Venkateswara, an incarnation of Vishnu, who is believed to have appeared here to save mankind from trials and troubles of Kali Yuga. Hence the place has also got the name Kali Yuga Vaikuntham and Lord here is referred to as Kali Yuga Prathyaksha Daivam. The temple is also known by other names like Tirumala Temple, Tirupati Temple, Tirupati Balaji Temple. Lord Venkateswara is known by many other names: Balaji, Govinda, and Srinivasa. Tirumala Hills are part of Seshachalam Hills range. The hills are 853 metres (2,799 ft) above sea level. The Temple is constructed in Dravidian architecture and is believed to be constructed over a period of time starting from 300 CE. The Garbagriha (Sanctum Sanctorum) is called AnandaNilayam. It is the richest temple in the world in terms of donations received and wealth. The temple is visited by about 50,000 to 100,000 pilgrims daily (30 to 40 million people annually on average), while on special occasions and festivals, like the annual Brahmotsavam, the number of pilgrims shoots up to 500,000, making it the most-visited holy place in the world.
