= Navagraha temples =

Hindu temples in India

Navagraha (Pron: nævəˈgrɑ:ə) temples is a designation for a specific kind of temples, and subsequent pilgrimage, found among Hindu traditions, devoted to the Navagraha—the nine (nava) major celestial bodies (Graha) of Hindu astronomy. It invokes the visit of temples dedicated to these celestial bodies, which are Surya (Sun), Chandra (Moon), Mangala (Mars), Budha (Mercury), Brihaspati (Jupiter), Shukra (Venus), Shani (Saturn), Rahu (North Lunar Node) and Ketu (South Lunar Node). While many Hindu temples, especially in Southern India, contain a shrine dedicated to the Navagrahas, the planetary deities are also individually associated by traditions to some sanctuaries consecrated to them.

== Navagraha temple in Nepal ==
Nepals First Navagraha temple is Nabagraha Temple Syangja in Arjunchaupari-1, Syangja District of Nepal. The temple is built differently in an open roof concept.

== Navagraha temples in Kerala ==
In Kerala, Navagraha temples are rare, like other states. Unlike other Navagraha temples,Kilimarathukavu navagraha temple is elliptical in structure, much like the galaxy.

== Navagraha temples in Tamil Nadu ==
The Navagraha temples in Tamil Nadu generally refer to a set of sanctuaries situated in the vicinities of Mayiladuthurai and Kumbakonam, constructed during the Chola dynasty. The state is also home to other series of such places of worship, lesser in popularity, such as the Nava Tirupati and the Nava Kailasam in Southern Tamil Nadu, and the Kundrathur and Vellore Navagraha temples in Northern Tamil Nadu.

=== Tanjore ===
The Navagraha temples set of the Tanjore region is perhaps the most important one in Southeastern India and beyond, where practice of pilgrimage is the far developed.

As per Hindu legend, Sage Kalava was suffering from serious ailments along with leprosy. He prayed to the Navagrahas, the nine planet deities. The planets were pleased by his devotion and offered cure to the sage. Brahma, the Hindu god of creation, was angered, as he felt that the planets had no powers to give boons to humans. He cursed the nine planets to suffer from leprosy and sent them down to earth in Vellerukku Vanam, the white wild flower jungle – the modern Suryanar Kovil. The planets prayed to Shiva to relieve them of the curse. Shiva appeared to them and said that the place belonged to them and they would have to grace the devotees worshipping them from the place. Each temple is located in a different village, and is considered an abode of one of the Navagrahas.

The Surya temple is the only one dedicated to the Graham, or the celestial corps to which it is consecrated. Suryanar Koil is entirely dedicated to the worship of the Sun God, as the principal deity, and the other navagrahas, as attendant deities. It was built around the 11th or 12th century. The other temples were built earlier, ranging back to 7th-9th century, and are in fact Shivalayas, or Shaivite places of worship, where the planetary deities had been enshrined in dedicated chapels.

- Surya Navagrahastalam — Suryanar Kovil (Thanjavur District)
- Chandra Navagrahastalam — Thingalur (Thanjavur District)
- Angaraka Navagrahastalam — Vaitheeswaran Kovil (Mayiladuthurai District)
- Budha Navagrahastalam — Thiruvenkadu (Mayiladuthurai district)
- Guru Navagrahastalam — Alangudi (Thiruvarur District)
- Sukra Navagrahastalam — Kanjanur (Thanjavur District)
- Shani Navagrahastalam — Thirunallar (Karaikal District, Union Territory of Puducherry)
- Rahu Navagrahastalam — Thirunageswaram (Thanjavur District)
- Ketu Navagrahastalam — Keezhperumpallam (Mayiladuthurai District)

=== Tirunelveli ===
The Tirunelveli region, once known as the Thenpandi or Thenpandi Seemai (Southern Pandya Country or Pandya's Southern realm), houses two distinct series of Navagraha temples. The first set is a serie of temples dedicated to Vishnu, known as the Nava Tirupathi, and located in the Tamraparni lower valley, between Tiruchendur and Tirunelveli. The second set is a serie of temples dedicated to Shiva, known as the Nava Kailasam, and located along the Thamirabarani river, from its uplands to its delta, between Ambasamudram and Tiruchendur.

Both share the peculiarity of not being consecrated nor hosting explicitly the planetary deities. Rather, their presiding deities, either Vishnu or Shiva, are considered to be associated with the said graha, and solicited to intercede in specific astrological issues.

==== Nava Tirupati ====
These sanctuaries follow the Sri Vaishnava obedience, and are estimated sites in that faith, considered as Divya Desam (Holy Land). Vaishnavite cult is hence prominent in these temples. They are all located in the Tuticorin district (Thoothukudi District).

- Srivaikuntanathan Perumal Temple, Srivaikuntam — Suryan
- Vijayasana Perumal Temple, Srivaikuntam — Chandran
- Vaithamanidhi Perumal Temple, Thirukkolur — Sevvai
- Thirupuliyangudi Perumal Temple, Thirupuliyangudi — Budhan
- Adinatha Perumal Temple, Alwarthirunagari — Gurubhagawan
- Makara Nedunkuzhai Kannan Temple, Thenthiruperai — Sukran
- Srinivasa Perumal Temple, Perungulam — Shaniswaran
- Aravindalochanar Temple, Irattai Thirupathi — Raghu
- Devapiran Temple, Irattai Thirupathi — Kedhu

==== Nava Kailasam ====
These sanctuaries follow the Shaiva Siddhanta obedience, and are locally estimated sites, chiefly dedicated to Kailashanatha. Shaivite cult is hence prominent in these temples. They are spread between the districts of Thoothukudi and Tirunelveli.

- Papanasanathar Temple, Papanasam — Suryan
- Kailasanathar Temple, Cheranmadevi — Chandran
- Kailasanathar Temple, Kodaganallur — Sevvai
- Kailasanathar Temple, Thenthiruperai — Budhan
- Kailasanathar Temple, Murappanadu — Gurubhagawan
- Kailasanathar Temple, Sernthamangalam — Sukran
- Kailasanathar Temple, Srivaikuntam — Shaniswaran
- Kailasanathar Temple, Kunnathur — Raghu
- Kailasanathar Temple, Rajapathi — Kedhu

=== Kundrathur ===
There is a similar cluster of Navagraha temples in the erstwhile Thondai Nadu or Thondaimandalam, in and around the town of Kundrathur, nowadays a suburb of the Chennai metropolis. As in Tanjore and in the Nava Kailasam of Tirunelveli, these temples are Sivalayam. Like in the later, these places of worship don't contain a chapel or shrine dedicated to the respective Graha, baring the customary Navagraha altar. The presiding deity provides for astrological issues, and rituals for said planetary deity are conducted depending on the place.

This cluster of Navagraha worship temples has been founded by Thiyagaraja Gurukkal and Bhuvaneshwari, and their family spread it to public awareness, through publishing small sized book of Navagraha stalam puranam in Chennai.

The Nageshvara temple of Kundrathur is a peculiar temple in this set, due to connection with the Naganathasvami temple of Thirunagesvaram, near Kumbakonam. The Kundrathur temple was established in the 12th century by the Saiva Siddhantin saint and scholar Sekkilhar, inspired from the mentioned Shivalaya he visited on his travel to the Tanjore country, where it is the Rahu Sthala.

- Agatheeswarar Temple - Suryan - Kolapakkam
- Somanaadheeswarar Temple - Chandran - Somangalam
- Vaidheeswaran Temple - Angaragan - Poovirundhavalli (Poonamallee)
- Sundareswarar Temple - Budhan - Kovur
- Ramanaadheeswarar Temple - Guru - Porur
- Velleeswarar Temple - Sukran - Mangadu
- Agatheeswarar Temple - Shaneeswaran - Pozhichalur (Polichalur)
- Neelakandeswarar Temple - Kethu - Gerugambakkam
- Nageshwarar Temple - Rahu - Kundrathur

=== Vellore ===
Navagraha temples The Navagraha temples listed contain separate shrines for these gods or temple deity worshipped as that god.

- Surya Navagrahastalam - Karupulleshwarar temple, Vellore, Gudiyatham
- Chandra Navagrahastalam - Sri Linganatha Swamy temple
- Angaarakan Navagrahastalam - Sri Mahadevar temple
- Budha Navagrahastalam - Sri Semmalai temple
- Guru Navagrahastalam - Sri Gurubhagavan temple, Perumbadi.
- Sukra Navagrahastalam - Sri Kaalabhairavar temple, Pogalur
- Shani Navagrahastalam - Sri Baalasarthuleshwarar temple, Gudiyatham north
- Raahu Navagrahastalam - Sri Naganathaswamy temple, near Gudiyatham
- Ketu Navagrahastalam - Sri Naganathaswamy temple, near Gudiyatham

== Navagraha temple in Assam ==
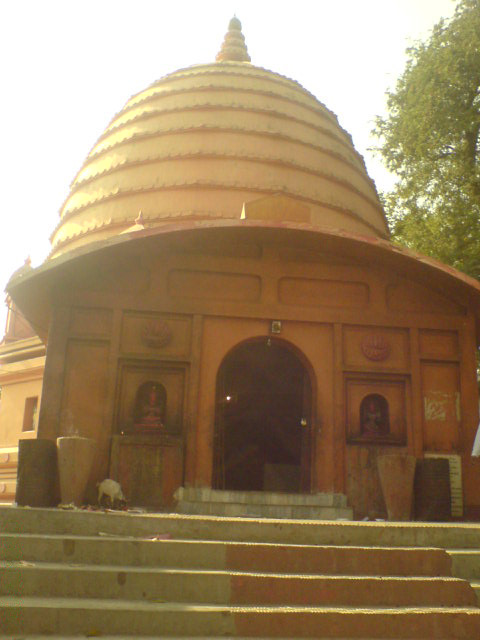
Navagraha temple in Guwahati

The Navagraha Temple is on the top of Chitrasal Hill (or Navagraha Hill), in Guwahati city, Assam. The existing brick temple on Chitrasal hill was built by Ahom king Swargadeo Rajeswar Singha during his reign from 1751 to 1769. Enshrined in this temple are nine Shivalingams, representing the nine celestial bodies, each covered with a coloured garment symbolic of each of the celestial bodies, with a Shivaligam in the centre symbolising the Sun. Connected to this Navagraha temple a nine-cornered (Na-kunia) tank was dug down in the valley south of it. This tank is known as Silpukuri.

== Navagraha temples in Nashik Maharashtra ==
Shri Anna Ganapati Navgraha Siddhapeetham, Nasik, which is 1.5 km from Nasik Road railway station. All Navgraha are residing in nine temple (gabhara/garbhagudi) with their wives. It is the only navgraha Siddhapeetham in Maharashtra. Peth (central Pune), there is a major Navagraha temple behind Shaniwar Wada, which is also specifically devoted to Shani. The temple complex is at a distance of 1.5 km from Kherdi junction. It is owned by Shri Sainath Maharaj Trust, Dombivli (E), Thane. The main temple belongs to Sai Baba and there are surrounding temples of Ganesha, Shiva, Navagraha temple and Sri Dattatreya temple.

== Navgraha temple in Madhya Pradesh ==
A long-established Navagraha temple is inside the Bada Ganpati Temple just behind Makaleshwar Temple towards the Harsidhhi temple in the city of Ujjain in Madhya Pradesh.

Devotees worship all nine planets here and they offer mustard oil and flowers to Shani at the temple during their prayers.

Devotees pray while doing parikrama of Navagraha stones and present flowers and bel leaves while performing pooja.

== Navagraha temple in Uttar Pradesh ==
=== Navagraha temple – Prayagraj ===
The Navagraha temple at Prayagraj in Uttar Pradesh was built by the Shri Patharchatti Ram Lila Committee in Prayagraj. It was opened to the public in 2012. It is located in the Rambagh area of Prayagraj. It can be reached within two minutes from the City Railway Station at Rambagh.

There are other temples as well:

- Shri Khatu Shyam Temple
- Shri Ram Temple

A jhaanki of Ganga Avataran is under construction and was expected to be complete by November 2012.

=== Navagrah temple – Karari Kaushambi ===
Navagrah temple at Karari Kaushambi in Uttar Pradesh was built by Shri Somnath Verma. It was opened to the public in 2017, in Ashok Nager in Karari Kaushambi. It can be reached within 15 minutes from the Bharwari railway station at Ashok Nagar.

There are other gods in it as well:

- Rama
- Radha Krishna
- Shiva
- Durga
- Ganesha
- Hanuman

== See also ==
- Navagraha Jain Temple
- Jyotisha
- Nakshatra
- Navagraha
- Saptarishi
- List of Hindu deities
- List of Hindu pilgrimage sites
- List of Natchathara temples
- List of Hindu temples
