= Sundararaja Perumal Temple (disambiguation) =

Sundararaja Perumal Temple may refer to several places:

== India ==
- Somangalam Sundararaja Perumal Temple, located at Somangalam, Kanchipuram district, Tamil Nadu.
- Peravallur Sundararaja Perumal Temple, situated at Peravallur, Chennai district, Tamil Nadu.
- Sundararaja Perumal temple, Tiruchirapalli, located at Anbil, Tiruchirappalli district, Tamil Nadu.
- Sundararaja Perumal Temple, Salem situated at Salem district, Tamil Nadu.

== Malaysia ==
- Sri Sundararaja Perumal Temple, located at Klang in Selangor, in Malaysia.
