= Maa Jhanjiri Mangala Temple =

Temple in India

Location
- Location: Cuttack, Orissa, India
- Interactive map of Maa Jhanjiri Mangala Temple
- Coordinates: 20.45964°N 85.87666°E

The Maa Jhanjiri Mangala Temple, or Jhanjiri Mangala Mandir is an ancient Hindu mandir (temple) dedicated to Mangala (Maa Mangala ), the presiding deity of the Cuttack City in Odisha, India. One of numerous temples in Cuttack, it is located at the area of Jhanjiri Mangala and is known also as Mangala Temple at Jhanjirimangala Square. During the annual festival of Durga Puja, the temple and its surroundings are extensively adorned with different types of lights, bamboo/ply gates, paper triangles, and other decorations.

== Mythological origin ==
According to legend, the land where the temple is located was previously forested. A priest who lived in the forest had a vision of the goddess "Mangala" who appeared in a dream and asked him to make a small temple for her.

The present temple was built by villagers of the Jhanjiri Mangala area. One of the oldest temple in Cuttack city.

== Theft ==
On 27 December 2015, the temple was broken into by thieves who made off with valuables (gold and silver ornaments) worth 4 or 5 lakh rupees. A number of small ancient temples throughout Cuttack had been targeted by a gang of thieves over the preceding months. In January 2016 those accused of being responsible were arrested.
