= Thirupuliyangudi Perumal Temple =

Perumal temple in Thoothukudi district, Tamil Nadu, India

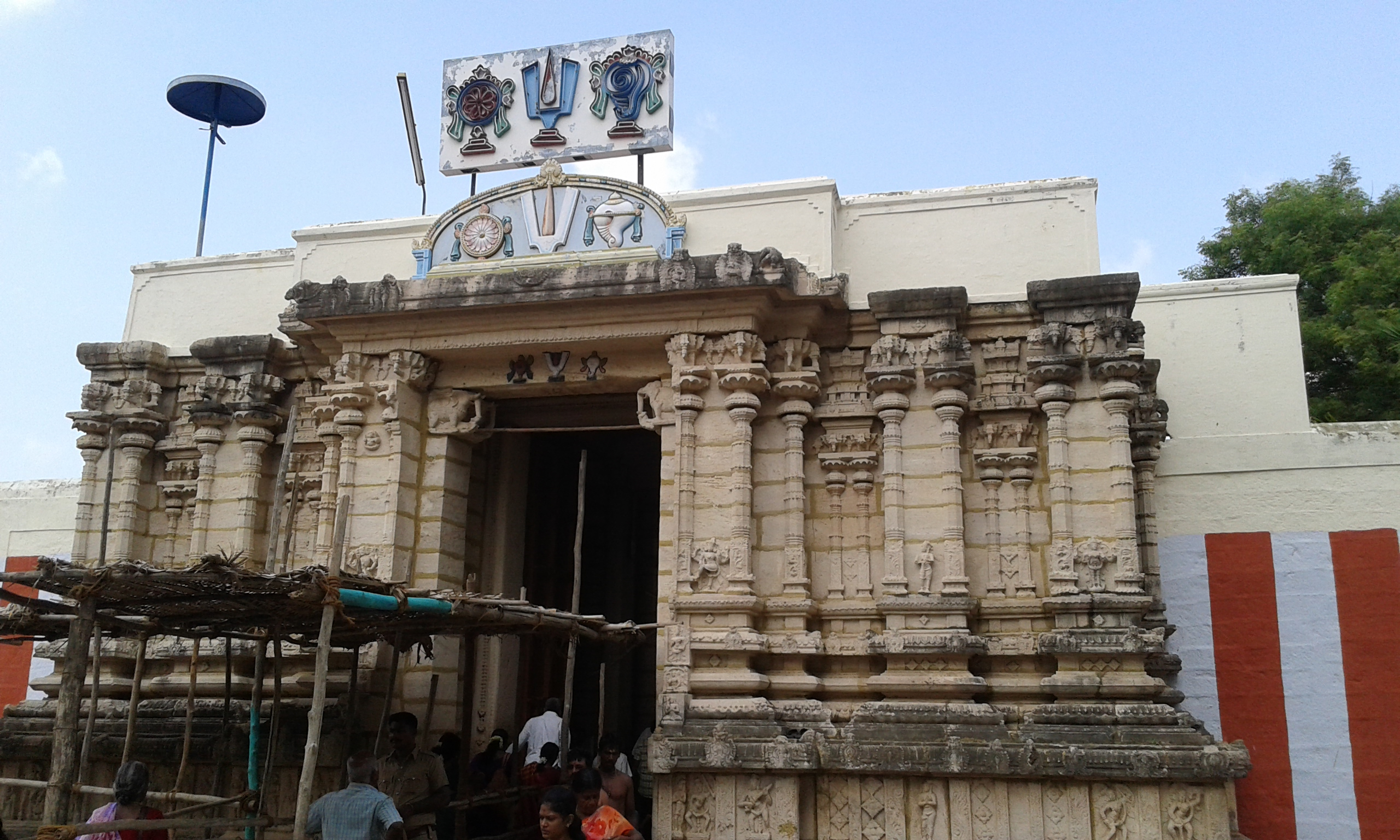

- Location in Tamil Nadu

Religion
- Affiliation: Hinduism
- District: Thoothukudi
- Deity: Bhumipalar (Vishnu); Pulingudivalli (Lakshmi)
- Features: Tower: Veda saara; Temple tank: Varuna

Location
- Location: Thirupuliangudi
- State: Tamil Nadu
- Country: India
- Coordinates: 8°38′23.1″N 77°55′58.0″E

Architecture
- Type: Dravidian architecture
- Elevation: 41 m (135 ft)

The Thirupuliyangudi Perumal Temple is one of the Nava Tirupati, the nine Hindu temples dedicated to Vishnu located in Tiruchendur-Tirunelveli route, Tamil Nadu, India in the banks of Thamiraparani river, in the South Indian state of Tamil Nadu. It is dedicated to the Hindu god Vishnu who is worshipped as Bhumipalar and Lakshmi as Pulingudivalli. It is located 22 km from Tirunelveli. Constructed in the Dravidian style of architecture, the temple is glorified in the Nalayira Divya Prabandham, the early medieval Tamil canon of the Alvar saints from the 6th–9th centuries CE. It is one of the 108 Divya Desams dedicated to Vishnu. The temple is also classified as a Nava Tirupati, the nine temples revered by Nammalvar located in the banks of Tamiraparani river. The temple is one of the Navagraha temples in the region, associated with Budha.

A granite wall surrounds the temple, enclosing all its shrines. The rajagopuram, the temple's gateway tower, is flat in structure. The temple follows Tenkalai tradition of worship. Six daily rituals and three yearly festivals are held at the temple, of which the ten-day annual Vaikuntha Ekadashi during the Tamil month of Margali (December - January) and the Nammalvar birth celebrations with Garudasevai with all nine temple of Nava Tirupati, being the most prominent. The temple is maintained and administered by the Hindu Religious and Endowment Board of the Government of Tamil Nadu.

== Legend ==
According to the temple's regional legend, Vishnu resided at this place when he once visiting the earth. Bhudevi, the earth goddess, and one of his consorts, grew upset with him because he did not meet her despite the fact that he was on the earth, choosing to spend his time with Sridevi. In her fury, she withdrew her presence from the land, moving to the netherworld. On account of her departure, all life on earth started to decay. The devas were worried and worshipped Vishnu to relieve the earth of this disaster. Vishnu went to the netherworld along with Sridevi to meet Bhudevi. Pacified, Bhudevi was convinced to return to the earth, restoring life to the planet. Since Vishnu had saved the world and rescued the living, he was called Bhumipalar, the guardian of the earth.

== Architecture ==
The temple is located in Tiruchendur-Tirunelveli route, Tamil Nadu, India in the banks of Thamiraparani river, in the South Indian state of Tamil Nadu. The temple is constructed in Dravidian style of architecture. All the shrines of the temple are located in a rectangular granite structure. The temple has an imposing image of Vishnu, a lotus stalk from the navel of the image emanates the image of Brahma. The feet of the deity can be viewed through the passage. The temple has two prakarams (closed precincts of a temple). The images of Bhudevi and Sridevi along with the festival images are located inside the sanctum.

== Festival ==
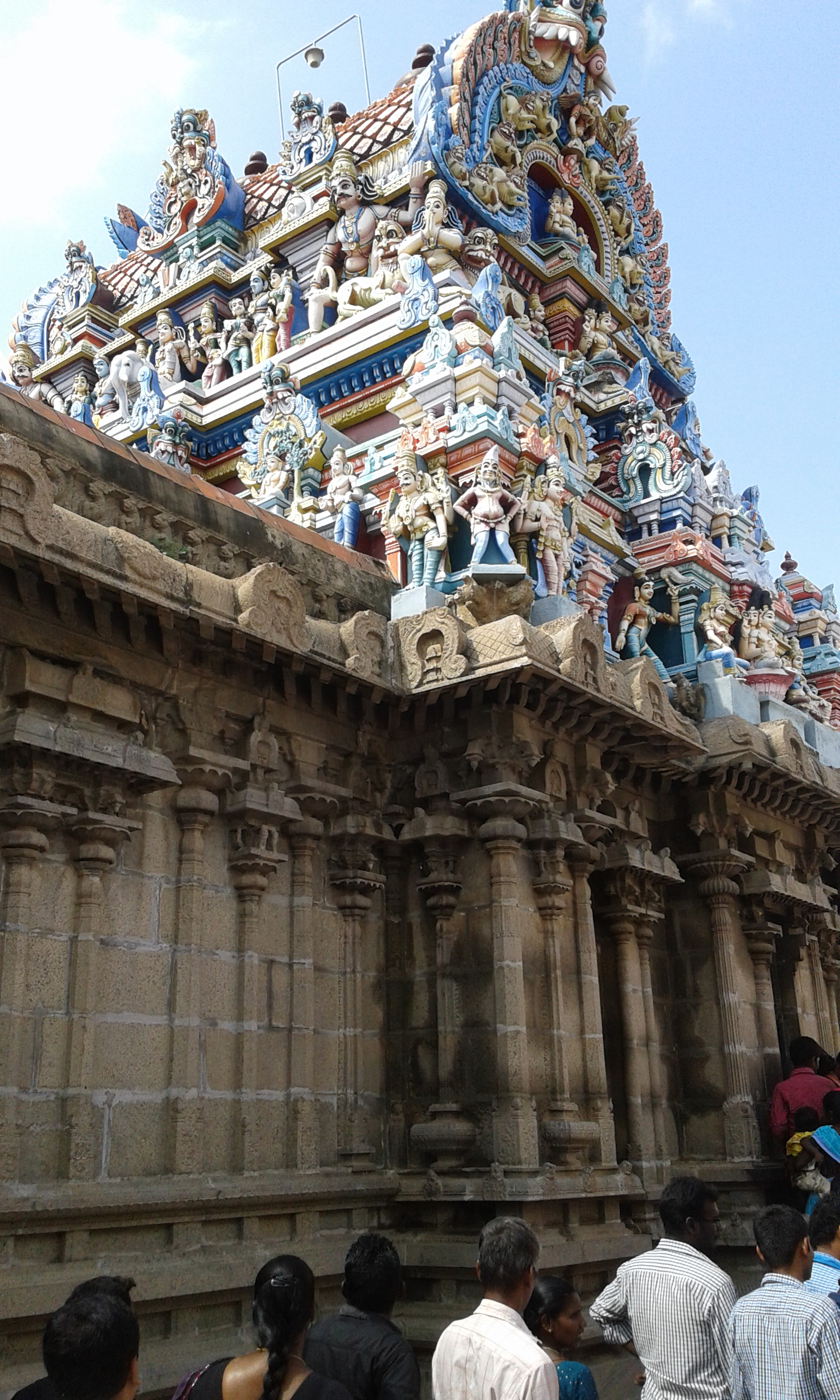
Image of the sanctum and view of foot of Ranganathar

The Garuda Sevai utsavam (festival) in the month of Vaikasi (May-Jun) witnesses nine Garudasevai, a spectacular event in which festival image idols from the Nava Tirupatis shrines in the area are brought on Garuda vahana (sacred vehicle). An idol of Nammalvar is also brought here on a Anna Vahanam (palanquin) and his paasurams (verses) dedicated to each of these nine temples are recited. The utsavar (festival deity) of Nammalvar is taken in a palanquin to each of the nine temples, through the paddy fields in the area. The pasurams (poems) dedicated to each of the nine Divya Desams are chanted in the respective shrines. This is the most important of the festivals in this area, and it draws thousands of visitors.

== Religious significance ==
Brahmanda Purana one of the eighteen sacred texts of Hinduism, written by Veda Vyasa contains a chapter called Navathirupathi Mahatmeeyam. The first part of the chapter refers to Srivaikuntam. Vaikunta Mahatmeeyam is another work in Sanskrit that mentions the temple and is a part of Tamraparani Sthalapurana available only in palm manuscripts. Nammalvar makes a reference about the temple in his work named Tirvuvaymoli. During the 18th and 19th centuries, the temple finds mention in several works like 108 Tirupati Antati by Divya Kavi Pillai Perumal Aiyangar. The temple also forms a series of Navagraha temples where each of the nine planetary deities of one of the temples of Nava Tirupati. The temple is associated with the planet Budha (Mercury).
