= Srivaikuntanathan Perumal temple =

Hindu temple of the god Vishnu in Srivaikuntam, India

Srivaikuntanathan Perumal Temple
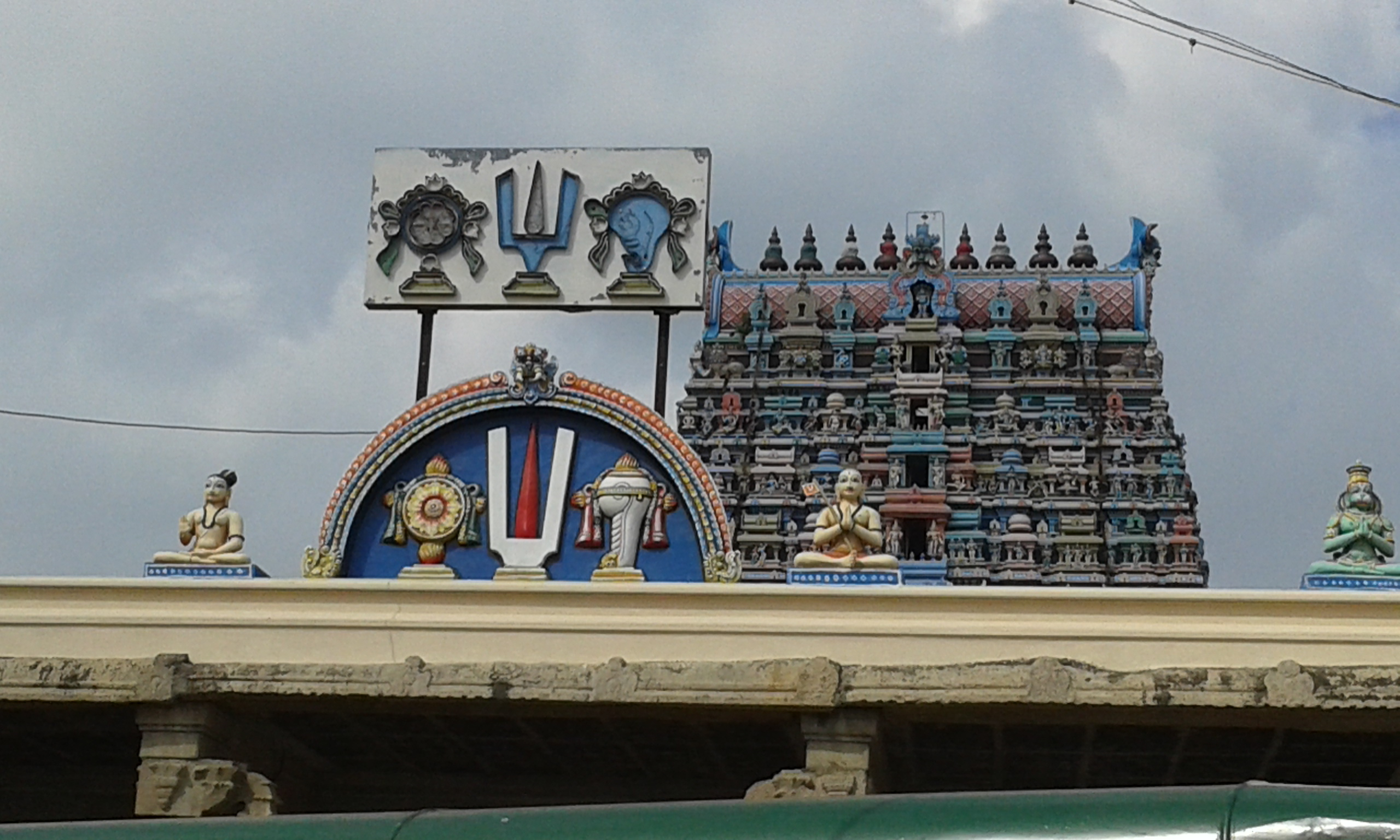

- Location in Tamil Nadu

Religion
- Affiliation: Hinduism
- District: Thoothukudi
- Deity: Vaikunthanathan (Vishnu) Vaikunthavalli (Lakshmi) Kallapiran (Vishnu)
- Features: Tower: Chandra; Temple tank: Brighu

Location
- Location: Srivaikuntam
- State: Tamil Nadu
- Country: India
- Interactive map of Srivaikuntanathan Perumal Temple
- Coordinates: 8°37′52.2″N 77°54′34.6″E

Architecture
- Type: Dravidian architecture
- Elevation: 41 m (135 ft)

Website
- navathirupathitemples.tnhrce.in/kallapiran.html

Srivaikuntanathan Perumal Temple (also called Srivaikuntam temple and Kallapiran temple) in Srivaikuntam, a town in Thoothukudi district in the South Indian state of Tamil Nadu, is dedicated to the Hindu god Vishnu. It is located 22 km from Tirunelveli. Constructed in the Tamil style of architecture, the temple is glorified in the Nalayira Divya Prabandham, the early medieval Tamil canon of the Alvar saints from the 6th–9th centuries CE. It is one of the 108 Divya Desams dedicated to Vishnu, who is worshipped as Vaikunthanathar and his consort Lakshmi as Vaikunthavalli. The temple is also classified as a Nava Tirupati, the nine temples revered by Nammalvar located in the banks of Tamiraparani river. The temple is next only to Alwarthirunagari Temple in terms of importance among the nine Navatirupathi temple. The temple is one of the Navagraha temples in Vaishnavism, associated with Surya, the sun god.

A granite wall surrounds the temple, enclosing all its shrines and two of its three bodies of water. The rajagopuram, the temple's gateway tower, is 110 ft (34 m) tall. Thiruvengadamudayan hall houses rare life size sculptures commissioned during the 16th century.

Srivaikuntanathar is believed to have appeared to slay Somukasura, who abducted the four Vedas. The presiding deity is called Pal Pandian as a cow performed ablution daily to the submerged deity during the Pandyan era and Kallapiran as he helped a thief who prayed to Vishnu while he was in trouble. The temple follows Tenkalai tradition of worship. Six daily rituals and three yearly festivals are held at the temple, of which the ten-day annual Brahmotsavam during the Tamil month of Chittirai (April - May) and the Nammalvar birth celebrations with Garudasevai with all nine temple of Nava Tirupati, being the most prominent. The temple is maintained and administered by the Hindu Religious and Endowment Board of the Government of Tamil Nadu.

== Legend ==
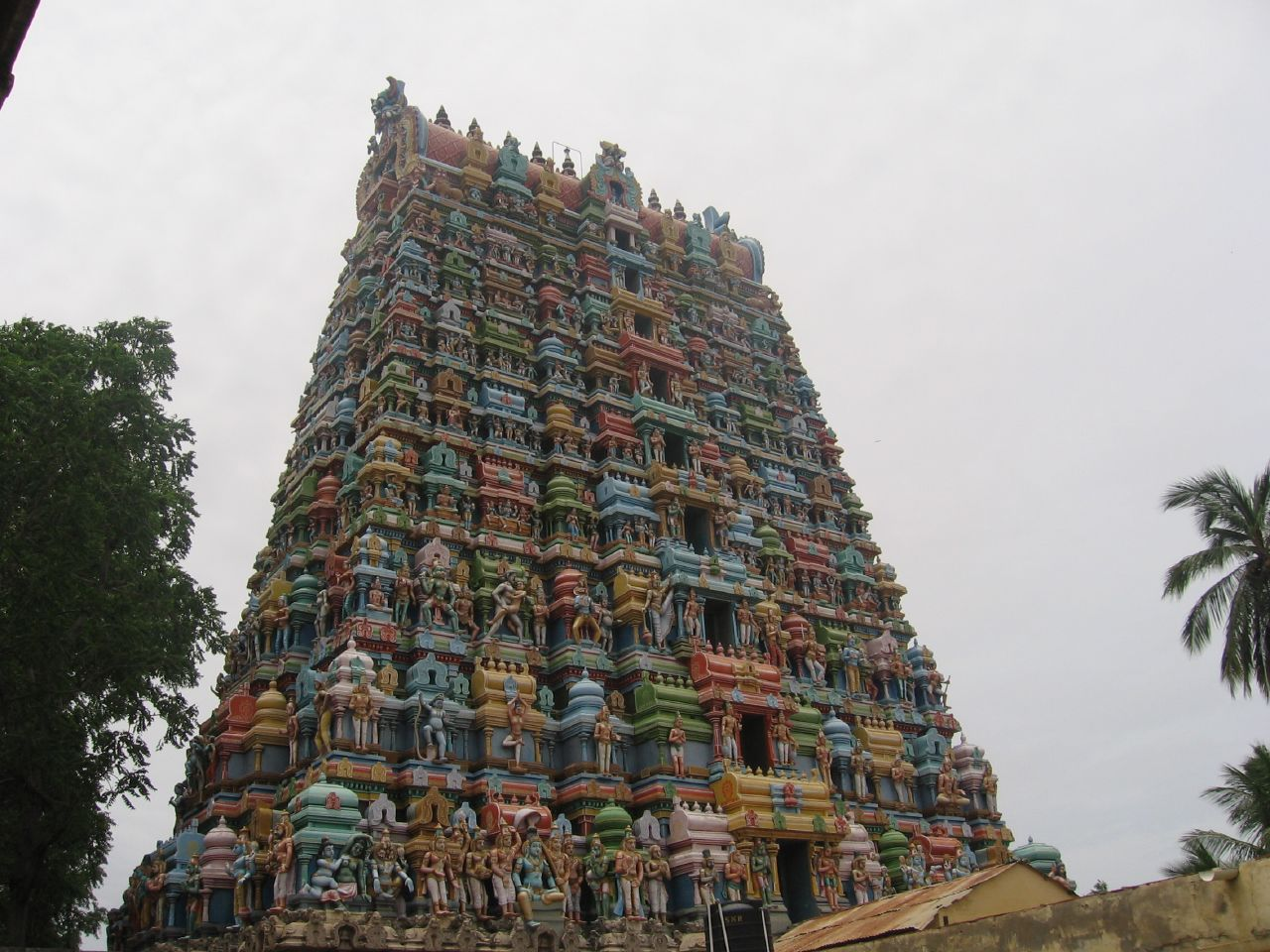
Image of the main entrance

According to the temple's regional legend, Somukasura, an asura, defeated Brahma, the Hindu god of creation and stole the four Vedas (sacred texts) from him. Brahma was helpless, and he did severe penance in the banks of Tamiraparani river, seeking favour from Vishnu in the form of Vaikuntanathan. Pleased by the penance, Vishnu appeared to Brahma and promised to retrieve the Vedas. Taking form of a divine fish called the Matsya avataram, Vishnu killed the Somukasura and restored the Vedas to Brahma. He also wished to set his abode as Srivakuntam and resided there as Vaikunthanatha.

As per another legend, the image of Vaikunthanatha, over the period of several ages, had no patrons and was left submerged under the earth. A cow from a herd of the king, which used to graze at the place, did ablution at the place with its where Vaikunthanatha lay buried. The king was displeased to see that a particular cow alone was not yielding milk and thought it might have been the trick of the herdsman. He deployed his men to monitor the cow, who reported the events to the king. The king realised that the cow would lead him to divinity and he dug up the region around the place. He reinstated the image of Vaikunthanathar and expanded the temple. Since Vaikunthanathar was revealed by the cow, the presiding deity got the name Pal Pandian (pal in Tamil indicates milk).

Kaladushana was a head of robbers in the region. The ruling Pandya king wanted to arrest him, but his attempts were futile. During one of the encounters, he could arrest everyone except Kaladushana. Kaladushana prayed to Srivaikuntanathar to save him and his troop from the king. Vaikunthanathar appeared as Kaldushana and surrendered before the king. Later, he appeared in the dreams of the king to narrate the events and also informed him that he wanted the king and the people to learn that large accumulation of ill-gotten wealth would be stolen and would reach the right hands. The king was enlightened and he released Kaladushana and his troop. Since Vaikunthanathar appeared for thieves (called kalla in Tamil), he came to be known as Kallapiran.

== History ==
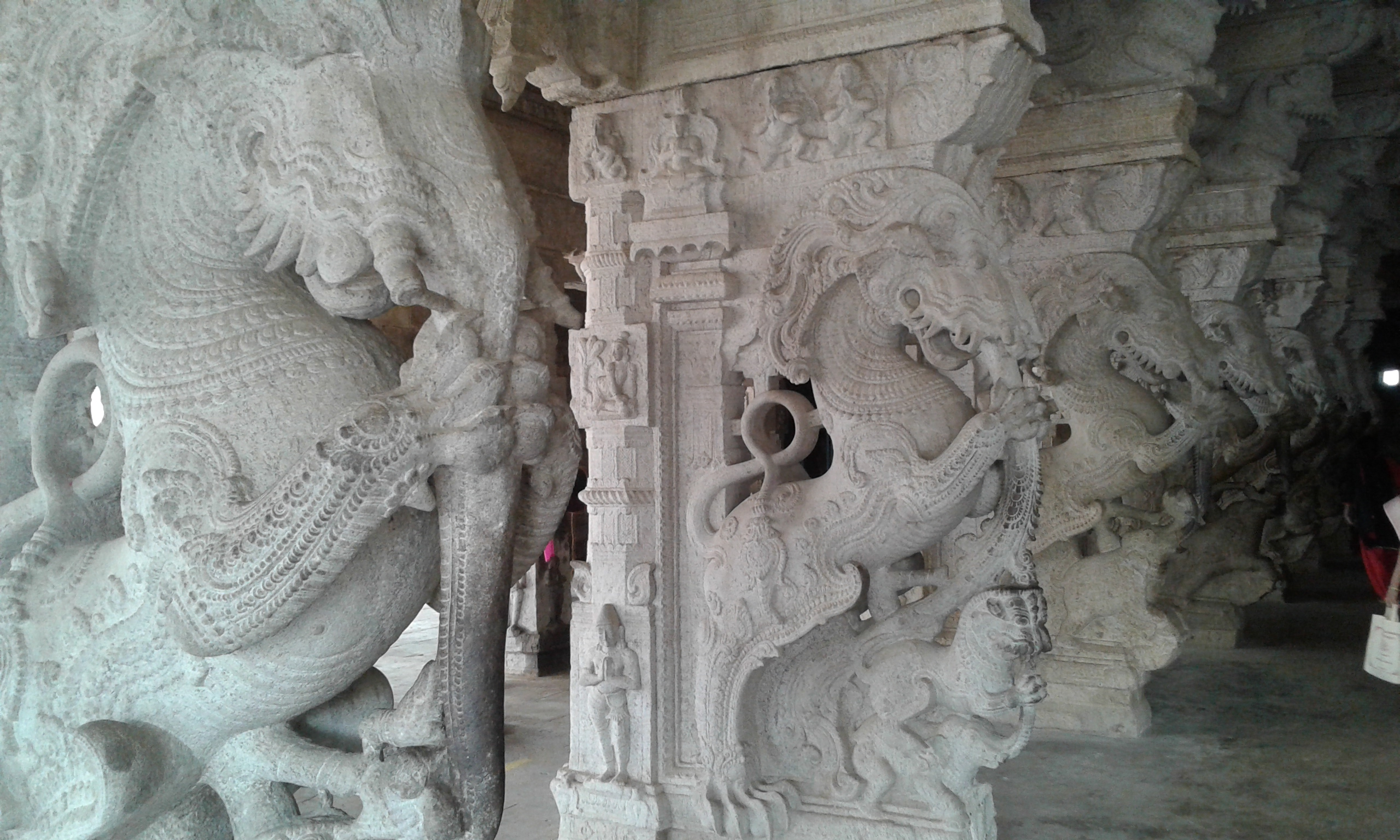
Pillared hall with yalis, the symbol of pandyas

There are six inscriptions in the temple deciphered by the Archaeological Department. The inscription from a ruler named Konerimaikondan records a gift of five velis of land as a tax free gift to the temple. The temple also obtained grant for building and maintenance of a garden from a ruler who defeated the Cheras. The Pandya ruler Jatavarman Kulasekaran I (1190–1216 CE) also offered a similar grant to the temple. Maravarman Sundara Pandyan (1216–1238) made offerings to perpetual lighting of the temple. An inscription from his reign also indicates the installation of the shrine of Vaikunthavalli. Vira Pandyan IV (1309–1345) offered land to the temple to perform special poojas in the temple during his birthday in the Tamil month of Vaikasi. During 1801, the temple acted as a fort for the British against the forces of Veerapandiya Kattabomman (1790–99). It is believed that the marks of war and destruction of Pandiyan history by the later nayakkar were visible in the temple during modern times.

== Architecture ==
The temple occupies an area of 5 acres (2.0 ha) and is surrounded by a granite wall 580 ft (180 m) long and 396 ft (121 m) broad. The rajagopuram, the temple's gateway tower, is 110 ft (34 m) tall. The granite wall surrounds the temple, enclosing all its shrines and two of its three bodies of water. The sanctum houses the image of Vishnu as Srivaikunanatha in standing posture with a club in his hand. Adishesha, the serpent-mount of Vishnu, is seen holding a parasol over his head. The image is made of shaligrama stone and ablution is usually done with milk. The hall preceding the sanctum, the Artha Mandapam houses the festival image of Vishnu made of panchaloha with the images of his consorts Sridevi (Lakshmi) and Bhudevi on either of his sides. It is believed that the sculptor caressed the cheeks of the image with his hand as he got enchanted by the image and it is seen in the image. The Ardha mandapa is guarded by two dvarapalas on either sides. This is the only temple where Adishesha the serpent, guards Vishnu in standing posture unlike the other places where it covers in sitting posture.

There are two shrines for the two consorts of Vishnu, Caikunta Nayaki and Chorantha Nayaki, both facing each other. There are separate shrines for Vishvaksena (Senai Mudaliyar), Garuda, Krishna as Venugopala, Manavala Mamunigal and Yoga Narasimha. The festival image of Yoga Narasimha and Lakshmi Narasimha, is also housed in the same shrine. There is another shrine that houses the images of the ten avatars of Vishnu. The temple has five precincts. The Mahamandapa and the Swarga Madapa are believed to be later additions.

The Vijayanagar and Nayak kings commissioned paintings on the walls of the shrine of temple, some of which are still present. Thiruvengadamudayan hall, located to the right of the gopuram, houses rare life size sculptures commissioned during the 16th century. It was built by Vadamalayappa Pillai, an official in the Madurai Nayak kingdom. There are numerous images of yalis, elephants and deities in the hall, some of which are even 5 ft (1.5 m) wide. The major images seen in the temple are that of Bhikshatana, Venugopala, Krishna as Madanagopala, Krishna as Govardhanagiri, Nammalvar, Kamadeva (Manmatha) and Rati. Depiction of Hanuman in various poses can be seen in the temple. There are life size images of Agora Virabhadra and warriors. Rama is seen hugging the monkey king Sugreeva with his right hand and holding his bow in the left and on his left stands Sita, while in another pillar he is seen hugging Hanuman with his right hand and Angada seen standing in anjali. A host of monkey warriors standing at the bottom of both the sculptures. The composite columns of Virabhadra holding sword and horn are found be additions of the Vijayanayagara kings during the early 1500s.

The dhvajastambha mandapam has pillars with refined architectural features. The Tirumoli mandapam has sculptures of monkeys, squirrels and parrots. It also houses images of monkeys performing various activities. The corridor inside the temple has paintings having the details about the 108 Divya Desam shrines of Vishnu. There are also paintings detailing the coronation of Rama. There are two temple tanks namely Brighu Theertha and Kalasa theertha near the temple. A huge temple tank near the Tamiraparani river is also associated with the temple. It is in this tank that the float festival is celebrated yearly.

Lions, Yalis and elephants are carved in the pillars of the mandapam. The temple served as a fort during the patriotic war of Kattabomman with the British. The temple has a nine-tier rajagopuram amidst lush vegetation around the temple.

== Religious significance ==
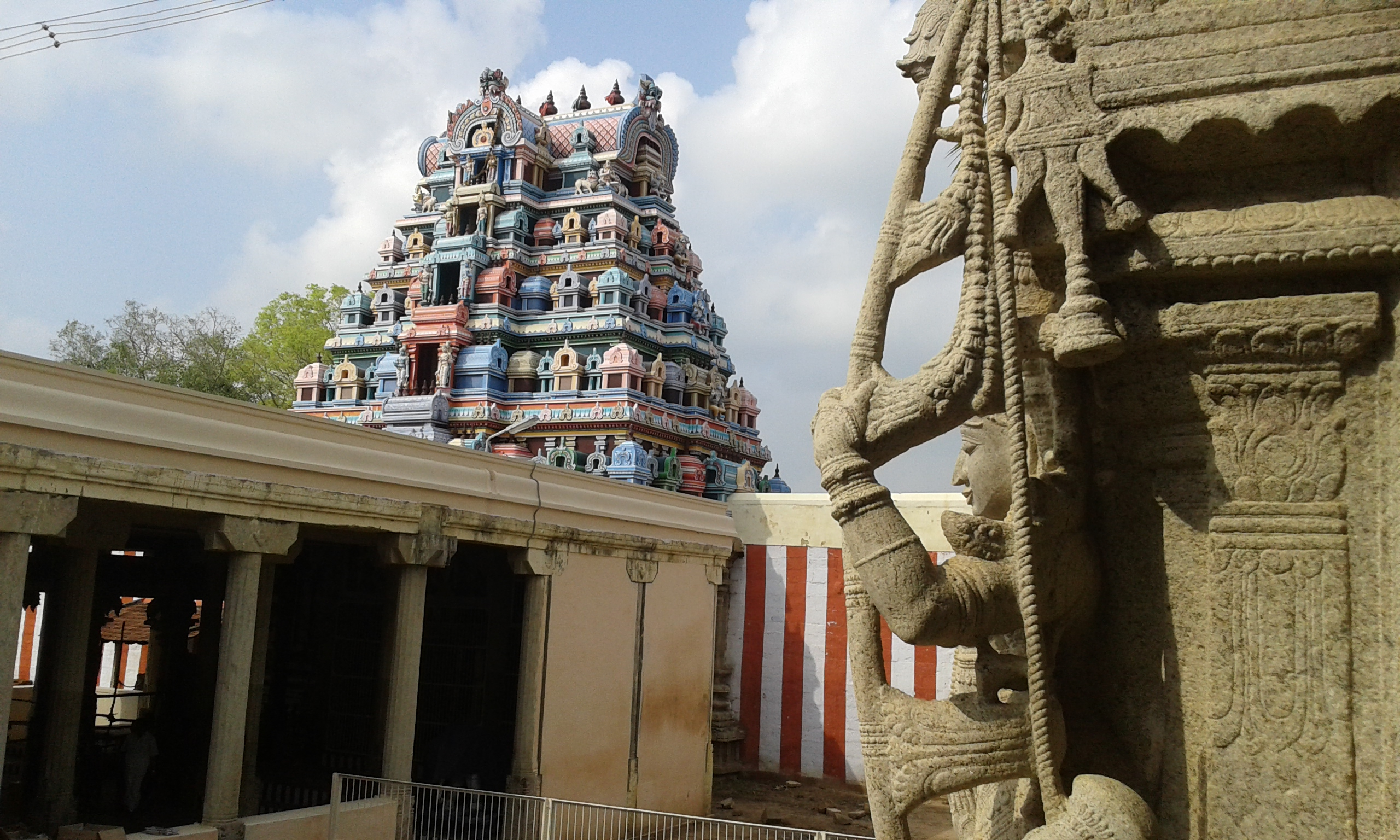
Image of the second gateway tower

Brahmanda Purana one of the eighteen sacred texts of Hinduism and written by Veda Vyasa contains a chapter called Navathirupathi Mahatmeeyam. The first part of the chapter refers to Srivaikuntam. Vaikunta Mahatmeeyam is another work in Sanskrit that glorifies the temple and is a part of Tamraparani Sthalapurana available only in palm manuscripts. The temple is revered in Nalayira Divya Prabandham, the 7th–9th century Vaishnava canon, by Nammalvar. The temple is classified as a Divya Desam, one of the 108 Vishnu temples that are mentioned in the book. The temple is also classified as a Navatirupathi, the nine temples revered by Nammalvar located in the banks of Tamiraparani river. The temple is next only to Alwarthirunagari Temple in terms of importance among the nine Navatirupathi temple. Nammalvar makes a reference about the temple in his works in Tiruvaymoli. During the 18th and 19th centuries, the temple finds mention in several works like 108 Tirupathi Anthathi by Divya Kavi Pillai Perumal Aiyangar, Vaikuntha Pillai Tamil, Vaikuntanatha Thalattu, Vaikuntanatha Tiruppanimalai and Srivakiuntam Ammanai. The roof over the sanctum is called Chandra vimana, where a stupa of gold is installed on the top. The temple also forms a series of Navagraha temples where each of the nine planetary deities of one of the temples of Navatirupathi. The temple is associated with the planet Surya, the Sun god.

== Festival ==
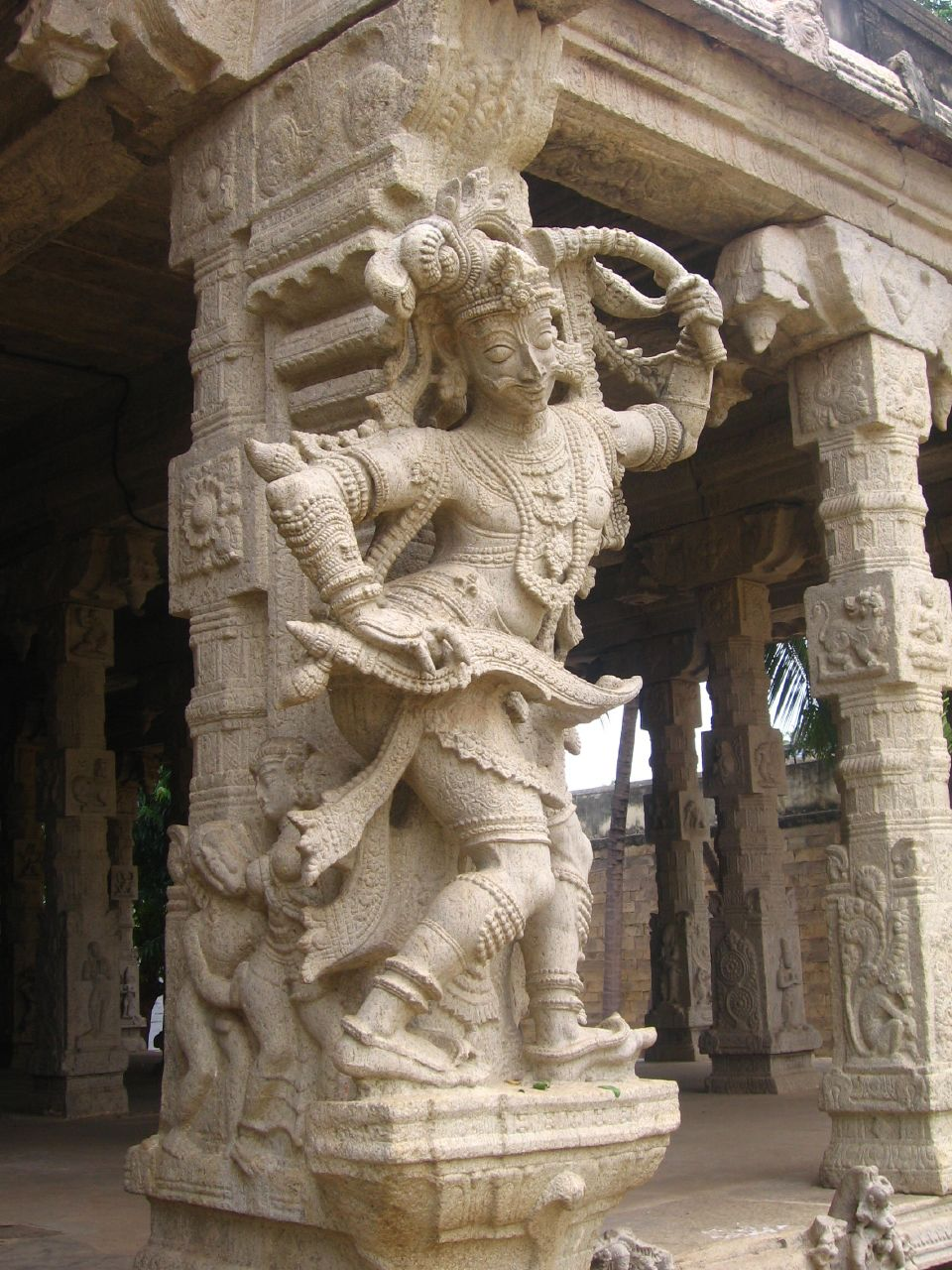
Image of warrior

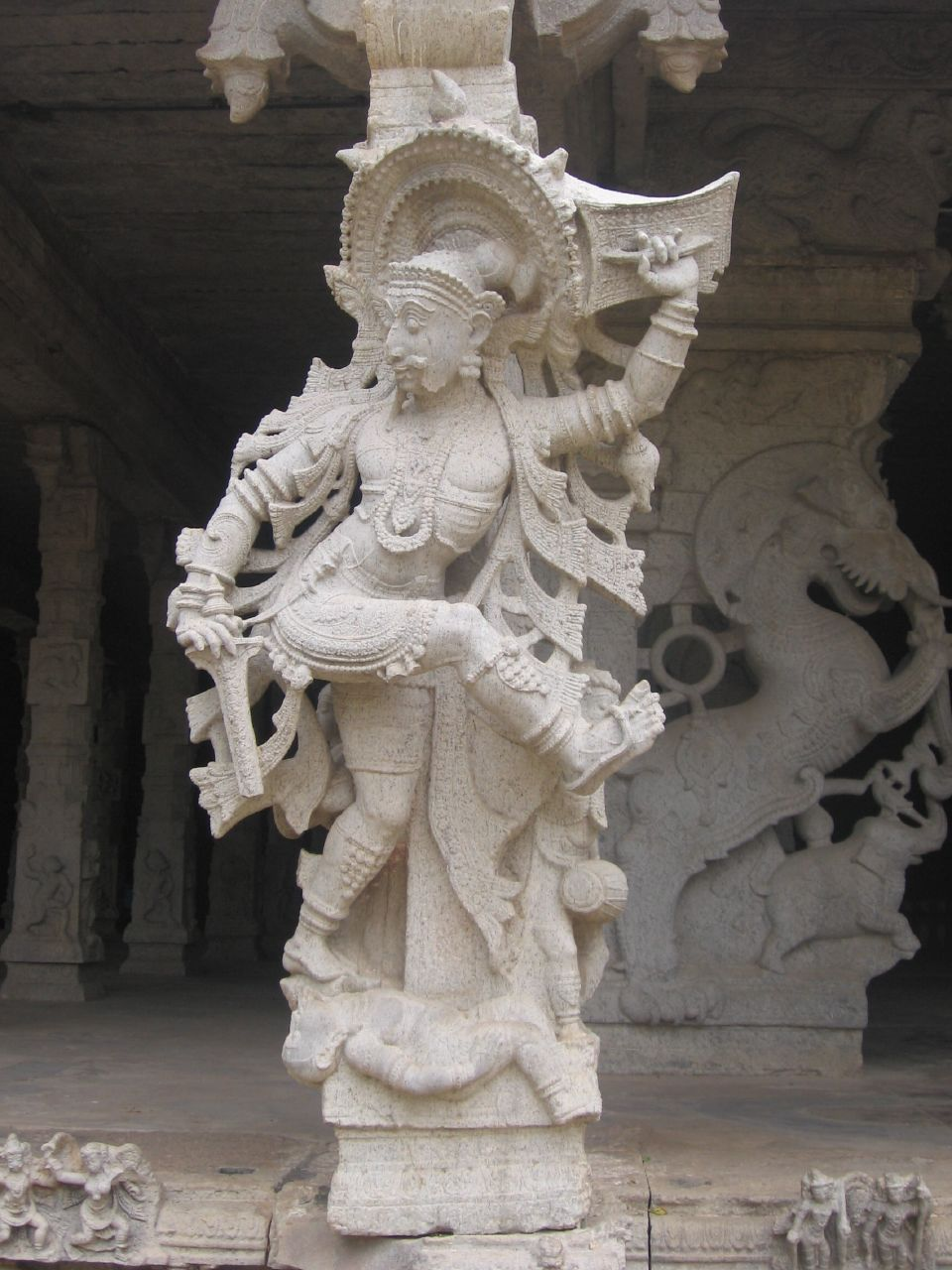
Image of Veerabadra

The Garuda Sevai utsavam (festival) in the month of Vaikasi (May-Jun) witnesses 9 Garudasevai, a spectacular event in which festival image idols from the Navatirupathi shrines in the area are brought on Garuda vahana (sacred vehicle). An idol of Nammalvar is also brought here on an Anna Vahanam (palanquin) and his pasurams (verses) dedicated to each of these 9 temples are recited. The utsavar (festival deity) of Nammalvar is taken in a palanquin to each of the 9 temples, through the paddy fields in the area. The pasurams (poems) dedicated to each of the nine Divya Desams are chanted in the respective shrines. This is the most important of the festivals in this area, and it draws thousands of visitors.

The temple follows the traditions of the Tenkalai sect of Vaishnavite tradition and follows Pancharathra aagama. The temple priests perform the pooja (rituals) during festivals and on a daily basis. As at other Vishnu temples of Tamil Nadu, the priests belong to the Vaishnavaite community, from the Brahmin class. The temple rituals are performed four times a day: Kalasanthi at 8:00 a.m., Uchikalam at 12:00 p.m., Sayarakshai at 6:00 p.m., and Ardha Jamam at 8:00 p.m. Each ritual has three steps: alangaram (decoration), neivethanam (food offering) and deepa aradanai (waving of lamps) for both Vaikunthanathar and Vaikunthavalli. During the last step of worship, nadasvaram (pipe instrument) and tavil (percussion instrument) are played, religious instructions in the Vedas (sacred text) are recited by priests, and worshippers prostrate themselves in front of the temple mast. There are weekly, monthly and fortnightly rituals performed in the temple.
