= Irattai Thiruppathy =

Pair of Hindu temples in Thoothukudi, Tamil Nadu

Irattai Thiruppathy Temples
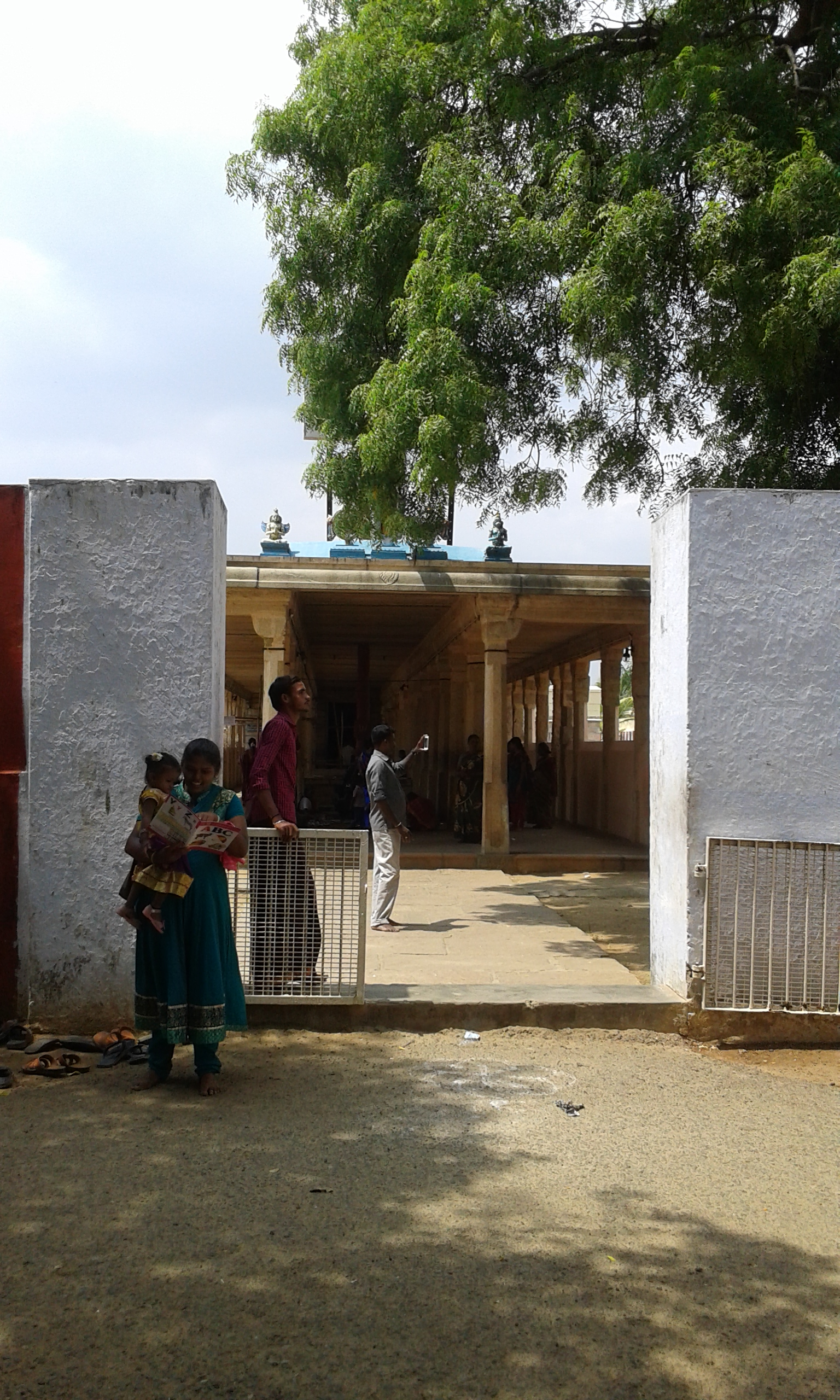
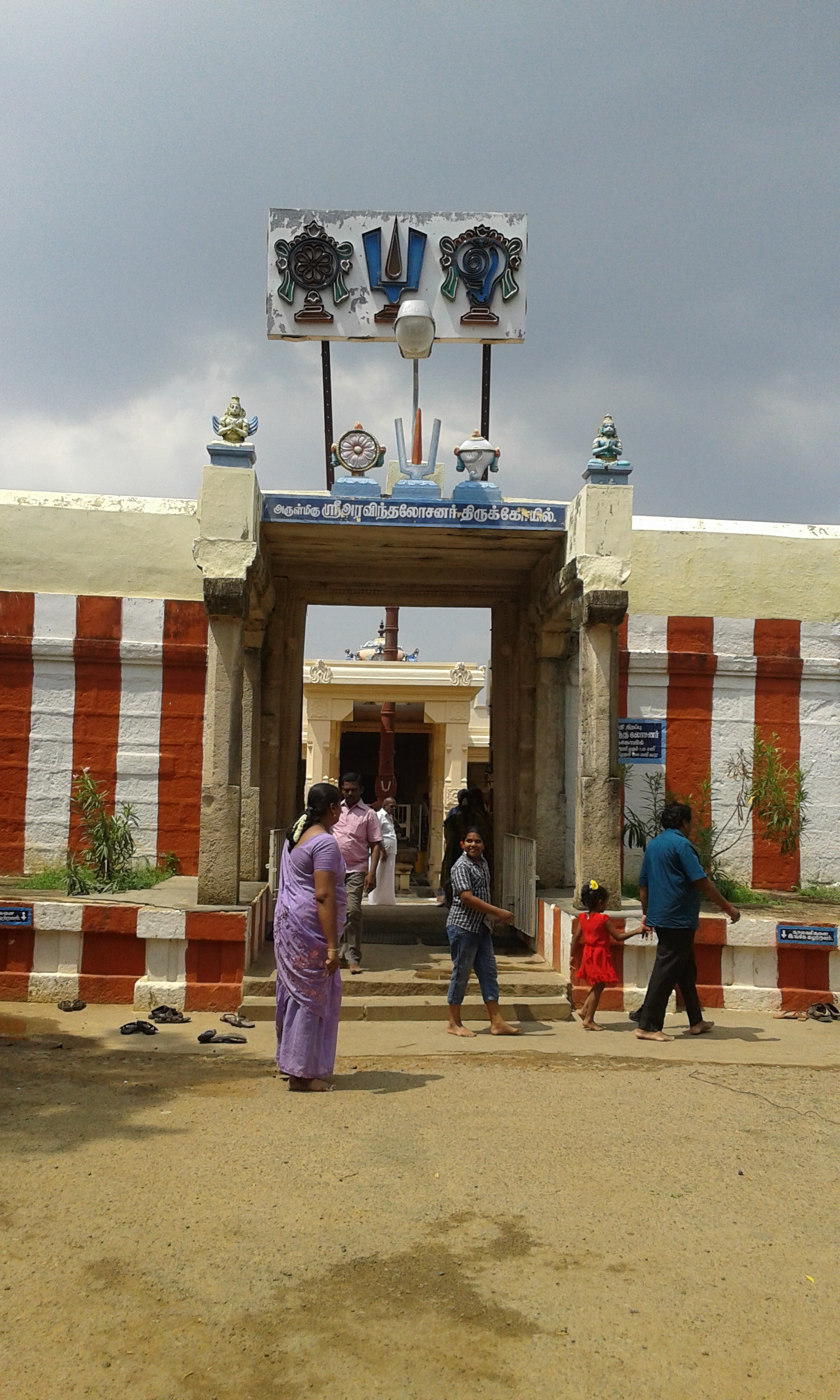
- The main entrances of the Devapiran temple (left) and the Aravindalochanar temple (right) from the street

- Location in Tamil Nadu

Religion
- Affiliation: Hinduism
- District: Tuticorin
- Deity: Aravindalosanar, Devapiran (Vishnu); Karunthadankanni, Vakshasthala Lakshmi (Lakshmi)
- Features: Tower: Kumuda; Temple tank: Varuna

Location
- Location: Thirutholavallimangalam
- State: Tamil Nadu
- Country: India
- Coordinates: 8°36′40″N 77°58′20″E

Architecture
- Type: Dravidian architecture
- Monument: 2

Website
- navathirupathitemples.tnhrce.in/irattaithiruppathy.html

Irattai Tirupati Temples refer to two temples of the Nava Tirupati, namely, the Devapiran temple and Aravindalochanar temple, which are dedicated to Vishnu. They are part of the nine "Divya Desams" located along the Tiruchendur-Tirunelveli route in Tamil Nadu, India on the banks of Thamiraparani river. The two temples are located adjacent to each other. All nine temples are part of the 108 temples of Vishnu revered by the 12 poet saint Alvars. The Irattai Tirupati is a Ketu Sthalam, sacred to the deity Ketu. Constructed in the Dravidian style of architecture, the temples are dedicated to Vishnu who is worshipped as Devapiran and Aravindalochanar and Lakshmi as Varagunavalli and Karuthadankanni.

A granite wall surrounds both the temples, enclosing their shrines. The rajagopuram (the temples' gateway tower) has a flat structure. The temples follow the Tenkalai tradition of worship. The ten-day annual Vaikuntha Ekadashi festival held during the Tamil month of Margali (December–January) and the Nammalvar birth celebrations with Garudasevai are the two most prominent. The temples are maintained and administered by the Hindu Religious and Endowment Board of the Government of Tamil Nadu.

== Legends ==
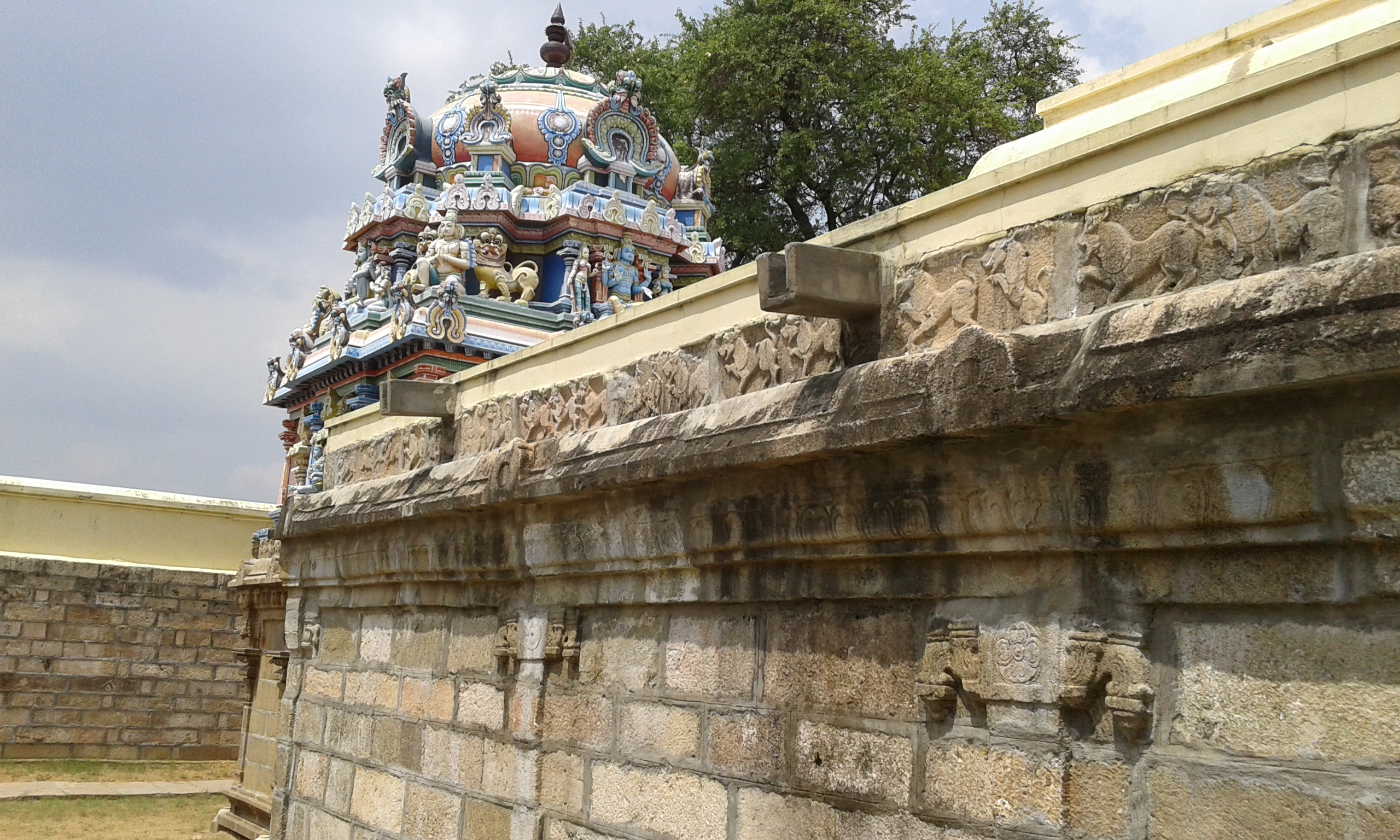
The vimana, the roof of the Devapiran sanctum

The temples are part of a regional legend of twin temples and are mentioned in both the Brahmanda Purana and the Padma Purana (under the name "Kedara Nilaya"). The legend tells of a sage named Suprabha who wanted to perform a penance. In his search for land, he ploughed at this place, and found a balance (tola) and a bow (vil). When he lifted them up, they turned into a human couple. The couple had once been cursed by Kubera for insulting him. Since the bow and balance were returned to their original form, the place is called Tolavillimangalam.

Suprabha continued to perform penance, at the end of which the devas received a share of the offerings (Havibhaga). Vishnu was pleased by the devotion of the sage; and since he appeared with devas, he came to be known as "Devapiran". While walking down the river with a lotus pond, he found Vishnu following him. At the request of the sage, Vishnu resided in this place as Aravindalochanar (the one who appeared from lotuses).

In another legend, the Ashwin twins wanted a share of the offerings made by men. They prayed to Brahma who redirected them to pray at this place. The twins came to the place and performed penance. They had a dip in the tank, which came to be known as Ashvini Tirtha. Vishnu appeared to them bearing lotus flowers in his hand and granted them their wishes.

Another regional legend tells of Somaka, an asura, who defeated Brahma, the Hindu god of creation, and stole the four Vedas (sacred texts) from him. Brahma was helpless and he did severe penance in the banks of Tamiraparani River seeking favour from Vishnu in the form of Devapiran. Pleased by the penance, Vishnu appeared to Brahma and promised to retrieved the Vedas. He killed Somuka and restored the Vedas to Brahma. He also wished to set his abode as Srivaikuntham and resided there as Vaikunthanatha.

== Architecture ==
It is understood from the inscriptions from the temples that they have were part of a ses'es of temples built by Pandyas and expanded by Madurai Nayaks. Unlike other South Indian temples, the temples do not have a typical rajagopuram (gateway tower). The temple's gateway tower is a flat structure, unlike other South Indian temples, which have a conical elevated structure. A granite wall surrounds each temple, enclosing all their shrines and two of the three bodies of water on the grounds. The sanctum of each of the temples houses the image of its chief deity. The images are made of shaligrama stone and ablution is usually done with milk. The halls preceding the sanctum, the Artha Mandapam, house the festival image of presiding deities along with the images of Sridevi and Bhudevi, one on either side.

=== Devapiran Perumal Temple ===
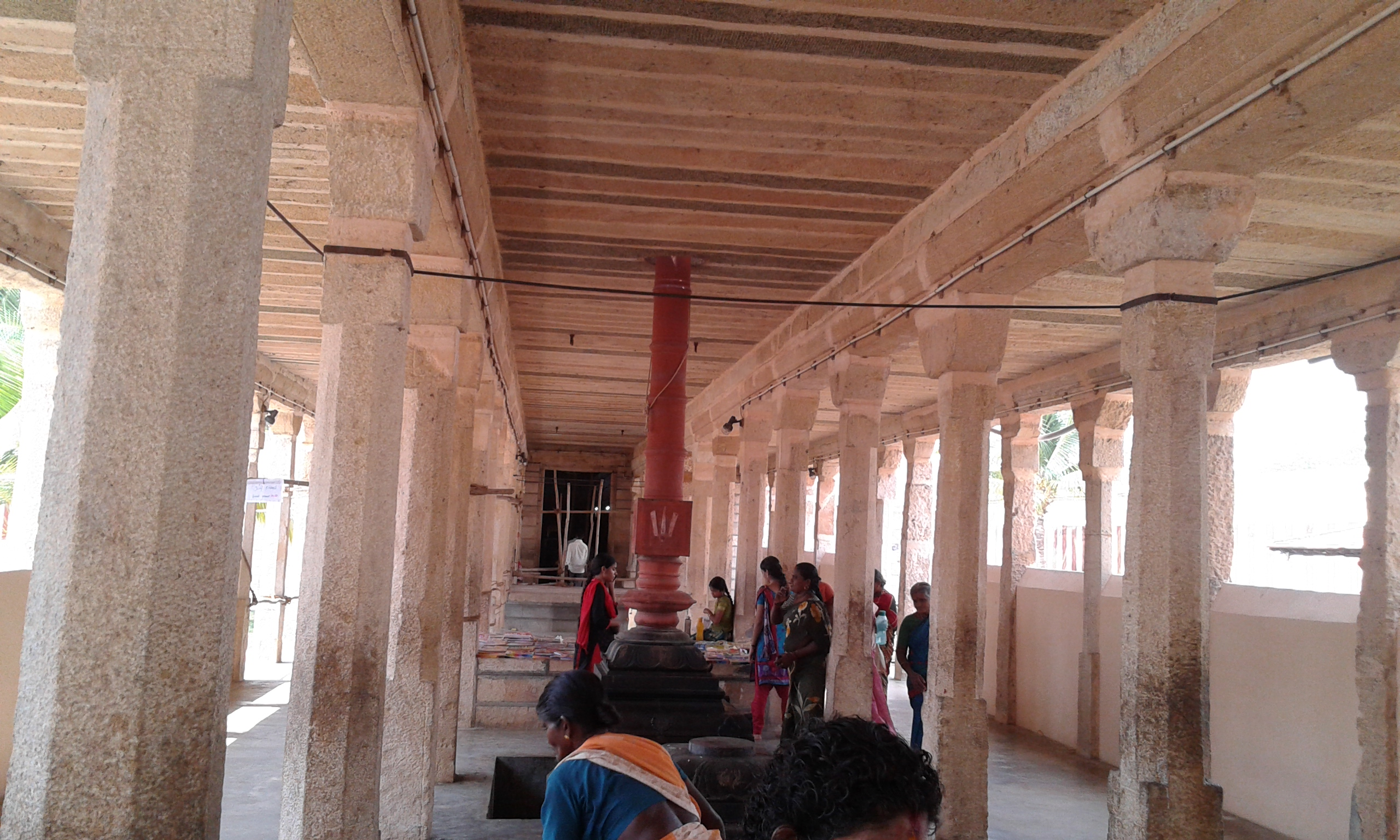
Pillared hall near the entrance of the Devapiran temple leads to the sanctum of small sculptures

There are six inscriptions in the temple that have been deciphered by the archaeological department. The inscription from a ruler named Konerimaikondan records a gift of five velis of land as a tax free gift to the temple. The temple also obtained grant for building and maintenance of a garden from a ruler who defeated the Cheras. The Pandya ruler Jatavarman Kulasekaran I (1190–1216 CE) also offered a similar grant to the temple. Maravarman Sundara Pandyan (1216–1238) made offerings to perpetual lighting of the temple. An inscription from his reign also indicates the installation of the shrine of Karunthadankanni. Vira Pandyan IV (1309–1345) offered land to the temple to perform special poojas in the temple during his birthday in the Tamil month of Vaikasi. During 1801, the temple acted as a fort for the British against the forces of Veerapandiya Kattabomman (1790–99). It is believed that the marks of war were visible in the temple during modern times. An official of the Madurai Nayak rule, Vadamalayappa Pillai arranged for the installation of Dasavathara images and Thiruvenkamudayan hall. There were also lot of offerings in jewels and kind made to the temple during his period. There were other people like Pillai Perumal, Ellarukum Nallan and Chockalingam, who made similar grants. The wooden chariot with minute sculptures were installed by Paramasivan Pillai during modern times.

The Devapiran temple occupies an area of 5 acres (2.0 ha) and is surrounded by a granite wall 580 ft (180 m) long and 396 ft (121 m) broad. The temple has five precincts. The sanctum houses the image of Devapiran standing, facing east. The hall preceding the sanctum houses the festival image of Kallapiran made of panchaloha. It is believed that the sculptor caressed the cheeks of the image with his hand as he got enchanted by the image and it is seen in the image. The Ardha mandapa is guarded by two dvarapalas on either side. There are two shrines for the two consorts of Vishnu, Vaikuntha Nayaki and Chorantha Nayaki, that face each other. There are separate shrines for Senai Mudaliyar, Garuda, Venugopala, Manavalamamunigal and Yoga Narasimha. There is another shrine that houses the images of the ten avatars of Vishnu, the Dashavataram. The Mahamandapa and the Svarga Madapa are believed to be later additions. The Dwajastamba mandap has pillars with refined architectural features.

The temple maintains an elephant, which is housed in the hall close to the temple flagstaff.

=== Aravindalochanar Perumal Temple ===
The exact history of the temple is not known. The temple occupies an area of 1 acre (0.40 ha) and is surrounded by a granite wall. The sanctum houses the image of Aravindalocha facing east, and also made of shaligrama stone. The hall preceding the sanctum houses the festival image of Aravindalocahanar with the images of Sridevi and Bhudevi on either side of him. The Mahamandapa has shrines for Senai Mudaliyar, Garuda, Venugopala, Manavalamamunigal, and the Alvars.

== Religious significance ==
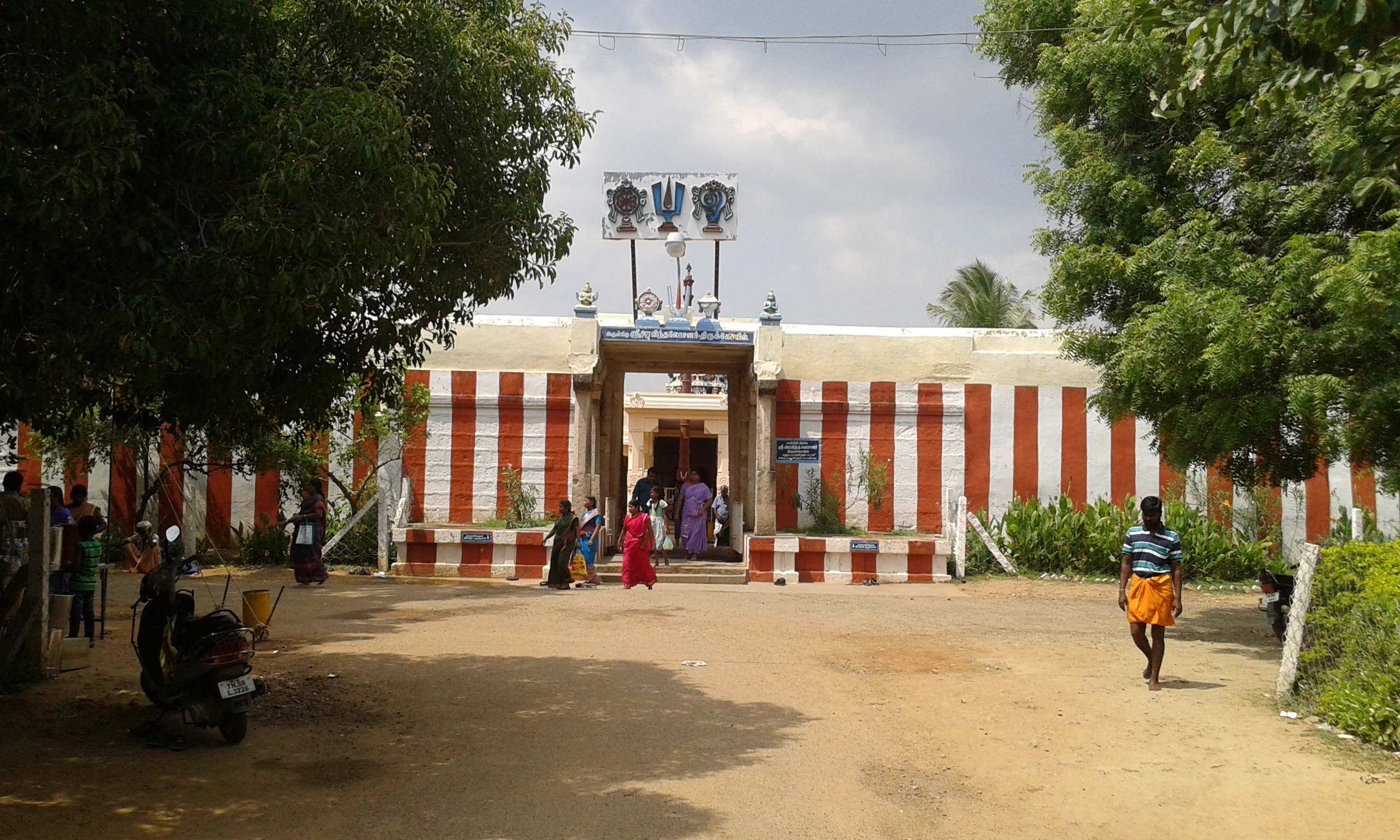
Aravinda Lochanar temple

The Brahmanda Purana, one of the eighteen sacred texts of Hinduism, written by Veda Vyasa, contains a chapter called Nava Tirupati Mahatmeeyam that describes all the nine temples of Nava Tirupati. Vaikuntha Mahatmeeyam is another work in Sanskrit that glorifies the temples and is a part of Tamraparani Sthalapurana available only in palm manuscripts. The Devapiran temple and Aravindalochanar temples are revered in Nalayira Divya Prabandham, the 7th–9th century Sri Vaishnava canon, one of whose authors was Nammalvar. The temple is classified as a Divyadesam, one of the 108 Vishnu temples that are mentioned in the book. The temple is also classified as a Nava Tirupati, the nine temples revered by Nammalvar located in the banks of Tamiraparani river. The temple is next only to Alwarthirunagari Temple in terms of importance among the nine Nava Tirupati temple. Nammalvar makes a reference about the temple in his works in his Tiruvaymoli. During the 18th and 19th centuries, the temple finds mention in several works like 108 Tirupati Antati by Divya Kavi Pillai Perumal Aiyangar. The temple also forms a series of Navagraha temples where each of the nine planetary deities of one of the temples of Nava Tirupati. There are two temples, one a north temple and other a south temple. Both the temples have two prakarams (closed precincts of a temple). It is referred to as Ketu sthalam, a location for the lunar deity, Ketu.

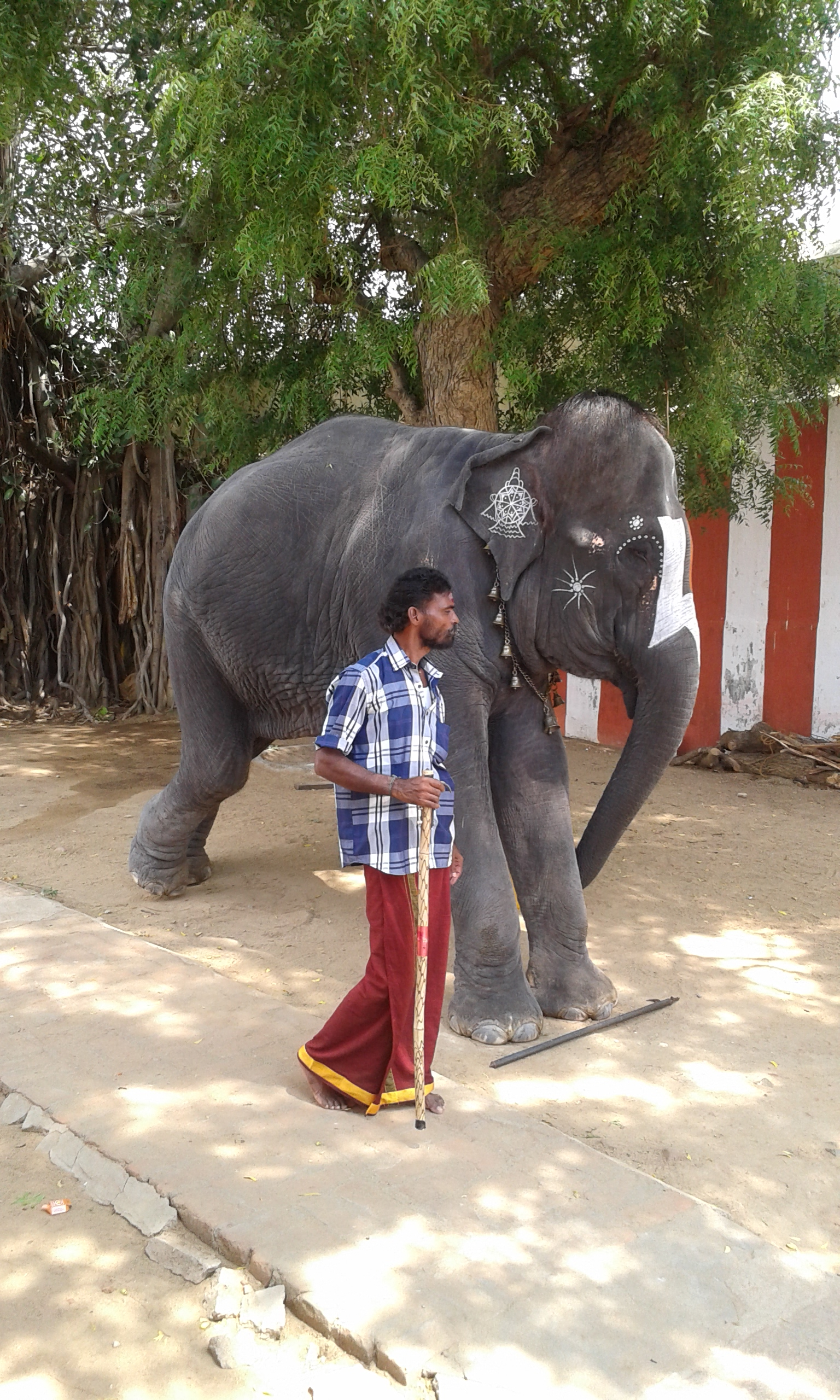
The temple elephant

== Festivals and religious importance ==
The Garuda Sevai utsavam Festival in the month of Vaikasi (May–Jun) witnesses nine Garudasevai, a spectacular event in which festival image idols from the Nava Tirupatis shrines in the area are brought out on Garuda vahana (sacred vehicle). An idol of Nammalvar is brought here on an anna vahanam (palanquin) and his pasurams (hymns) dedicated to each of these 9 temples are recited. The utsavar (an idol of the festival deity) depicting Nammalvar is taken in a palanquin to each of the 9 temples, through the paddy fields in the area. The pasurams (hymns or verses) dedicated to each of the 9 Divya Desams are chanted in the respective shrines. This is the most important of the festivals in this area, and it draws thousands of visitors.
