= Makara Nedunkuzhaikathar Temple =

Perumal temple in Thoothukudi district, Tamil Nadu, India

Makara Nedunkuḻaikathar Temple
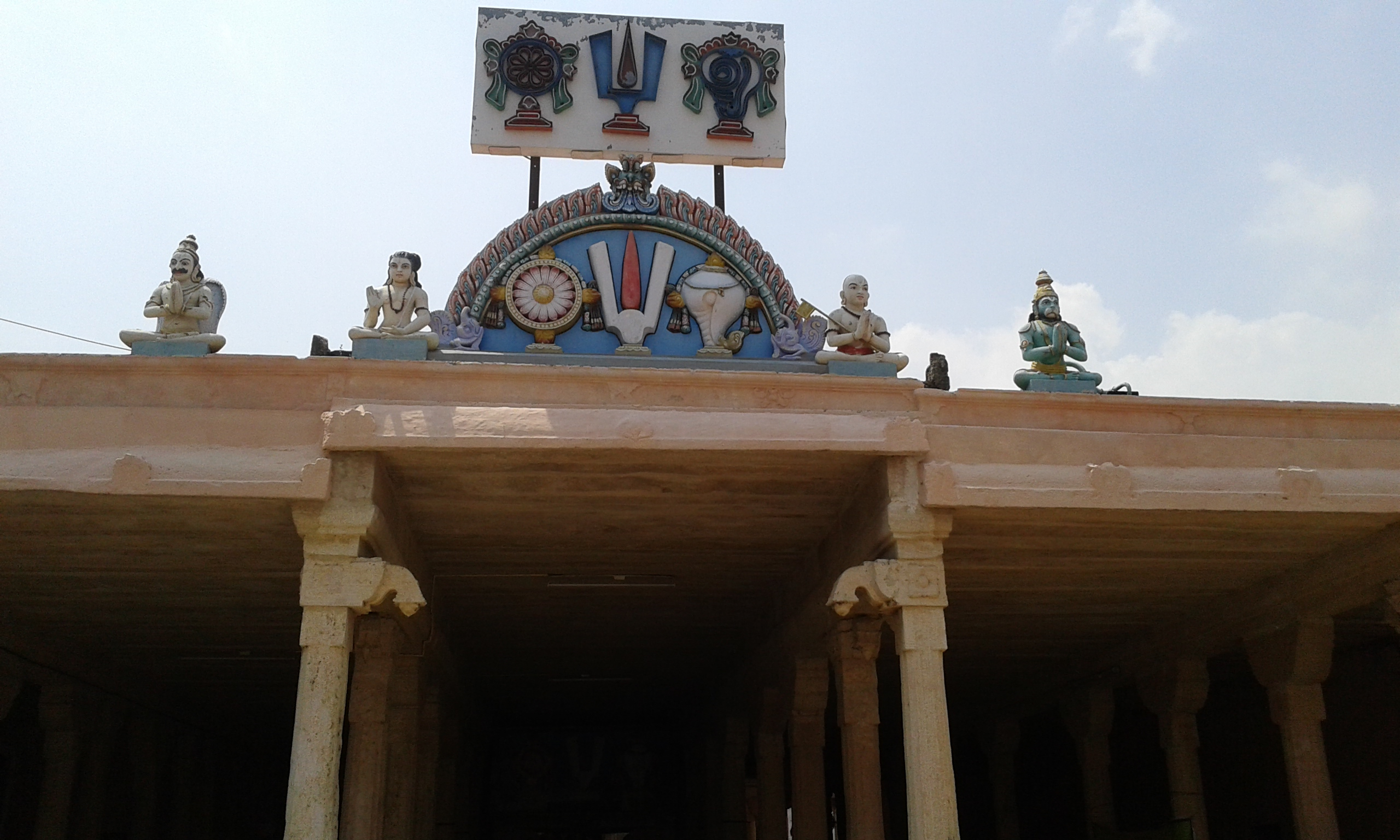

- Location in Tamil Nadu

Religion
- Affiliation: Hinduism
- District: Thoothukudi
- Deity: Makara Nedunkuḻaikathar (Vishnu) Kuḻaikaduvalli, Thiruperai Nachiyar (Lakshmi)
- Features: Tower: Bhadra; Temple tank: Shukra, Shankha

Location
- Location: Thenthiruperai
- State: Tamil Nadu
- Country: India
- Interactive map of Makara Nedunkuḻaikathar Temple
- Coordinates: 8°36′11.6″N 77°59′09.7″E

Architecture
- Type: Dravidian architecture

Specifications
- Monument: 1
- Elevation: 36 m (118 ft)

The Makara Nedunkuḻaikathar Temple is one of the Nava Tirupathi, nine Hindu temples dedicated to Vishnu located Thenthiruperai along Tiruchendur-Tirunelveli route, Tamil Nadu, India in the southern bank of Thamiraparani river. It is located 5 km from Alvar Thirunagari All these 9 temples are classified as Divya Desams, the 108 temples of Vishnu revered by the 12 poet saints, or Alvars. The temple is referred to as Sukra sthalam, a location for the planet deity, Sukra. Constructed in the Dravidian style of architecture, the temple is glorified in the Nalayira Divya Prabandham, the early medieval Tamil canon of the Alvar saints from the 6th–9th centuries CE. It is one of the 108 Divya Desams dedicated to Vishnu, who is worshipped as Makara Nedunkuḻaikathar and his consort Lakshmi as Tiruperai Nachiyar.

A granite wall surrounds the temple, enclosing all its shrines. The rajagopuram, the temple's gateway tower, is flat in structure. The temple follows Thenkalai tradition of worship. Six daily rituals and three yearly festivals are held at the temple, of which the ten-day annual Vaikuntha Ekadashi during the Tamil month of Margaḻi (December - January) and the Nammalvar birth celebrations with Garudasevai with all nine temple of Nava Tirupati, being the most prominent. The temple is maintained and administered by the Hindu Religious and Endowment Board of the Government of Tamil Nadu.

The same place hosts one of the Navakailasams, Sri Kailasanathar Temple, Then Thirupperai, the seventh in the series.

== Legend ==
As per the temple's regional legend, once Lakshmi, the consort of Vishnu was left alone as he went to earth and lived with Bhudevi. Lakshmi prayed to sage Durvasa to give her the beauty of Bhudevi. The sage went to meet Bhudevi, who was with Vishnu. She pretended not to have seen the sage. In his fury, the sage cursed Bhudevi to transfer her form to Lakshmi. Bhudevi pleaded with the sage to propitiate her off the curse. The sage asked her to pray to Vishnu on the banks of river Tamiraparani. On a new moon day, when she was performing the prayer in the river, she found a pair of earrings in the form of a fish. She offered it to Vishnu, who appeared before her. When Vishnu accepted the ear ring, Bhudevi got her original form. Since Bhudevi offered her the makara kundala, the earrings, the presiding deity came to be known as Makara Nedunkuḻaikathar, the one who attained the ear rings.

== Architecture ==
The temple is located in Tiruchendur-Tirunelveli route, Tamil Nadu, India in the banks of Thamiraparani river, in the South Indian state of Tamil Nadu. The temple is constructed in Dravidian style of architecture. All the shrines of the temple are located in a rectangular granite walls, pierced by a three-tiered gopuram. The presiding deity is sported in a standing posture with Sridevi and Bhudevi on either of his sides. The images of Bhoodevi and Sridevi along with the festival images are located inside the sanctum. In modern times, the temple is maintained and administered by the Hindu Religious and Endowment Board of the Government of Tamil Nadu.

== Festival ==
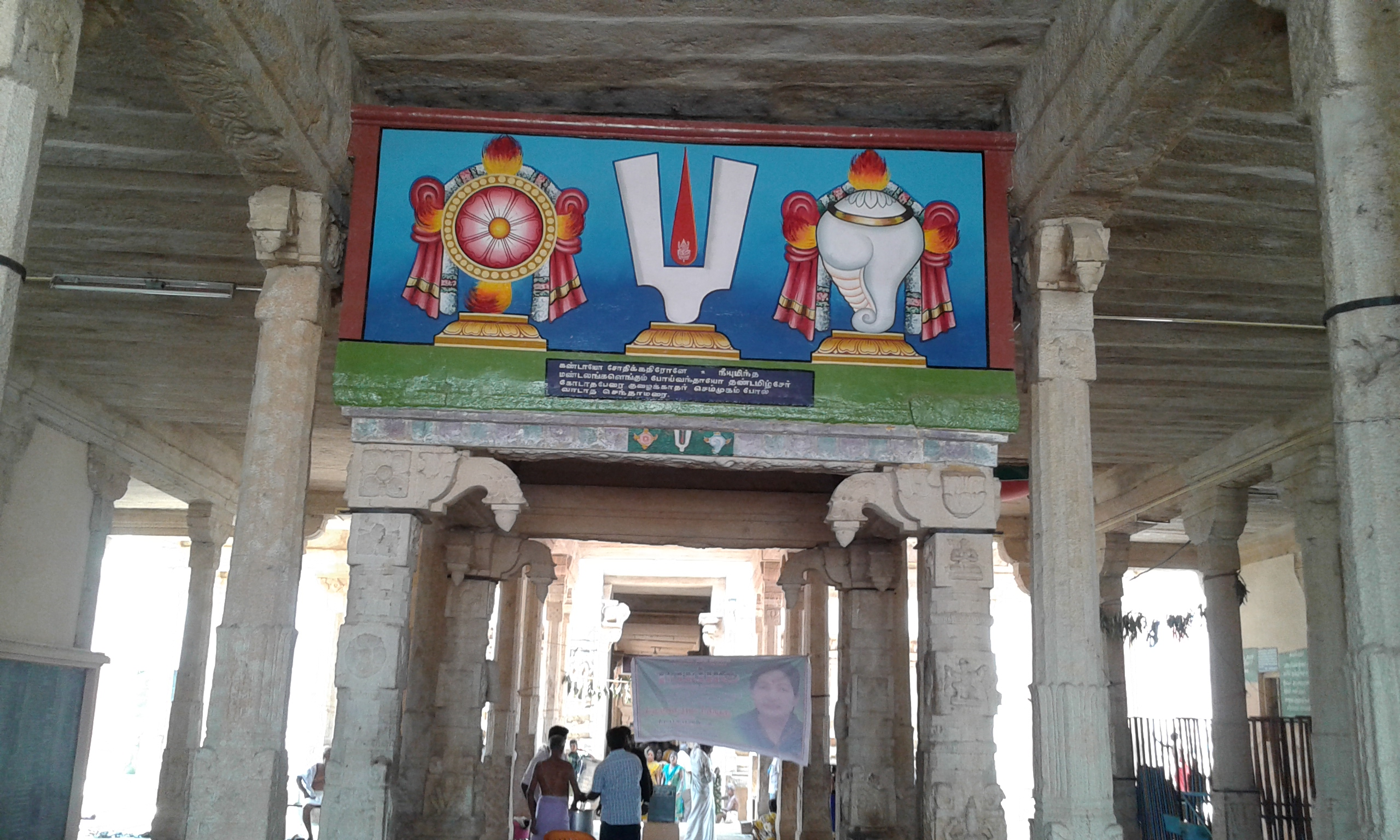
A hall inside the temple

The Garuda Sevai utsavam (festival) in the month of Vaikasi (May-Jun) witnesses 9 Garudasevai, a spectacular event in which festival image idols from the Nava Tirupathis shrines in the area are brought on Garuda vahana (sacred vehicle). An idol of Nammalvar is also brought here on a Anna Vahanam (palanquin) and his paasurams (verses) dedicated to each of these 9 temples are recited. The utsavar (festival deity) of Nammalvar is taken in a palanquin to each of the 9 temples, through the paddy fields in the area. The pasurams (poems) dedicated to each of the 9 Divya Desams are chanted in the respective shrines. This is the most important of the festivals in this area, and it draws thousands of visitors.

The temple follows the traditions of the Tenkalai sect of Vaishnavite tradition.

== Religious significance ==
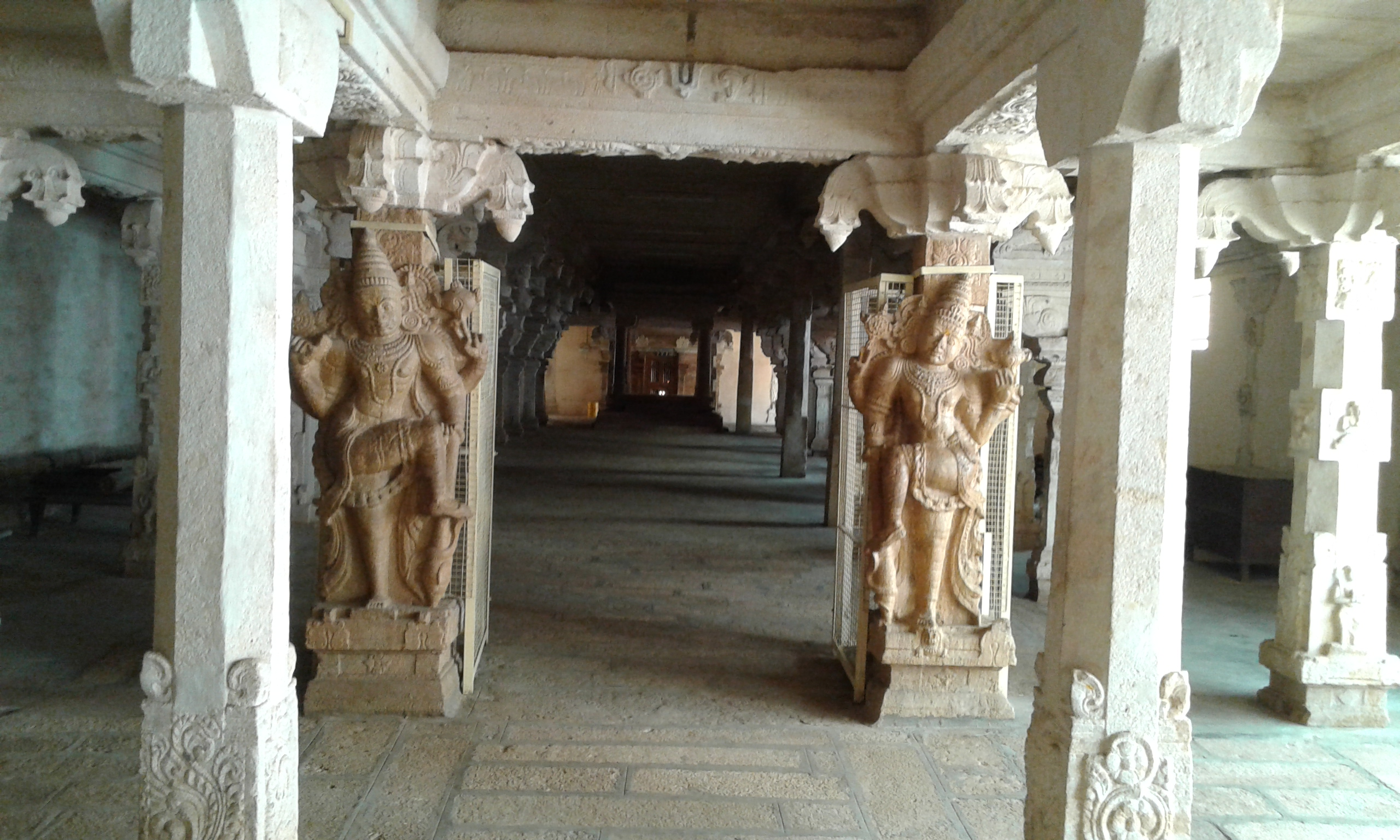
Image of the Thayar shrine

The Brahmanda Purana, one of the eighteen sacred texts of Hinduism, written by Veda Vyasa, contains a chapter called Navathirupathi Mahatmeeyam. Vaikunta Mahatmeeyam is another work in Sanskrit that glorifies the temple and is a part of Tamraparani Sthalapurana available only in palm manuscripts. The temple is revered in Nalayira Divya Prabandham, the 7th–9th century Vaishnava canon, by Nammalvar. The temple is classified as a Divya Desams, one of the 108 Vishnu temples that are mentioned in the book. The temple is also classified as a Nava Tirupati, the nine temples revered by Nammalvar located in the banks of Tamiraparani river. Nammalvar makes a reference about the temple in his works in Tiruvaymoli. During the 18th and 19th centuries, the temple finds mention in several works like 108 Tirupathi Anthathi by Divya Kavi Pillai Perumal Aiyangar. The temple also forms a series of Navagraha temples where each of the nine planetary deities of one of the temples of Nava Tirupati. The temple is associated with the planet Sukra (Venus).
