= Nava Tirupati =

Ennead of temples in Tamil Nadu

The Nava Tirupati (Tamil: நவ திருப்பதி, lit. 'Nine Tirupatis') refers to a group of nine Hindu temples dedicated to Vishnu, located on the Tiruchendur-Tirunelveli route, Tamil Nadu, India, on the banks of the Thamirabarani river. Each of these temples is classified as a Divya Desam, counted as one among the 108 temples of Vishnu, revered by the 12 poet-saints of the Tamil Vaishnava tradition, the Alvars.

== Temples ==
The temples are revered in Naalayira Divya Prabandham, the 7th–9th century CE Vaishnava canon, attributed by Nammalvar. The following is the list of the 9 temples.

Name of the temple	Deity	Planet	Sacred day	Photo	Location	Time
Srivaikuntanathan Perumal Temple, Srivaikundam	Surya	Sun	Sunday		Srivaikuntam	7 am - 12 pm, 5 - 8 pm
Vijayaasana Perumal Temple,Thiruvaraguna Mangai	Chandra	Moon	Monday		Natham	8 am - 12 pm, 1 - 6 pm
Vaithamanidhi Perumal Temple,Thirukkolur	Angaragan	Mars	Tuesday		Thirukolur	7:30 am - 12 pm, 4.30 - 8 pm
Kaaichinavendhan Perumal Temple, Thirupulingudi	Budha	Mercury	Wednesday		Thirupulingudi	8 am - 12 pm, 1 - 6 pm
Aadhinadha Azhwar Temple, Alwar Thirunagari	Guru	Jupiter	Thursday		Alvar Thirunagari	6 am - 12 pm, 5 - 8:45 pm
Makara Nedunkuzhai Kaadhar Temple	Sukran	Venus	Friday		Thenthiruperai	7 am - 12 pm, 5 - 8:30 pm
Srinivasa Perumal Temple, Tirukulandhai	Shani	Saturn	Saturday		Thirukulandhai	7:30 am - 12:30 pm, 4:30 - 7:30 pm
Irattai Thiruppathy, Aravindalochanar temple	Ketu	Lunar node			Tholavillimangalam	8 am - 1 pm, 2 - 6 pm
Irattai Thiruppathy, Devapiran temple	Rahu	Lunar node			Tholavillimangalam	8 am - 1 pm, 2 - 6 pm

== Festival ==
The Garuda Sevai Utsavam (a festival where a form of Vishnu, seated upon his mount Garuda, is revered) in the month of Vaikasi (May - June) witnesses 9 Garuda Sevai, as well as two palanquins, one with Nammalvar of Alwarthirunagari, and the other with Madurakavi Alvar from Thirukalur. An event in which festival image idols from the Nava Tirupati shrines in the area are brought on Garuda Vahana (Garuda as a mount) to Alvarthirunagari for Mangalasasanam (singing of sacred hymns) and to for paying obeisance to Nammalvar in the morning.

An idol of Nammalvar is also brought here on a palanquin, and his pasurams (verses) dedicated to each of these 9 temples are recited. In the night 9 Garuda Sevai by the Nava Tirupati Perumals and the two Alvars also on procession in circumambulations. A total of 11 temple chapparams (canopied-cars) move around the outer courtyards. The utsavar (idol venerated during procession) of Nammalvar is taken in a palanquin to each of the 9 temples, through the paddy fields in the area. The pasurams dedicated to each of the 9 Divya Desams are chanted in the respective shrines. This is the most important of the festivals in this area, and draws thousands of visitors.
