= Thiruvaragunamangai Perumal Temple =

Vishnu temple in Thoothukudi

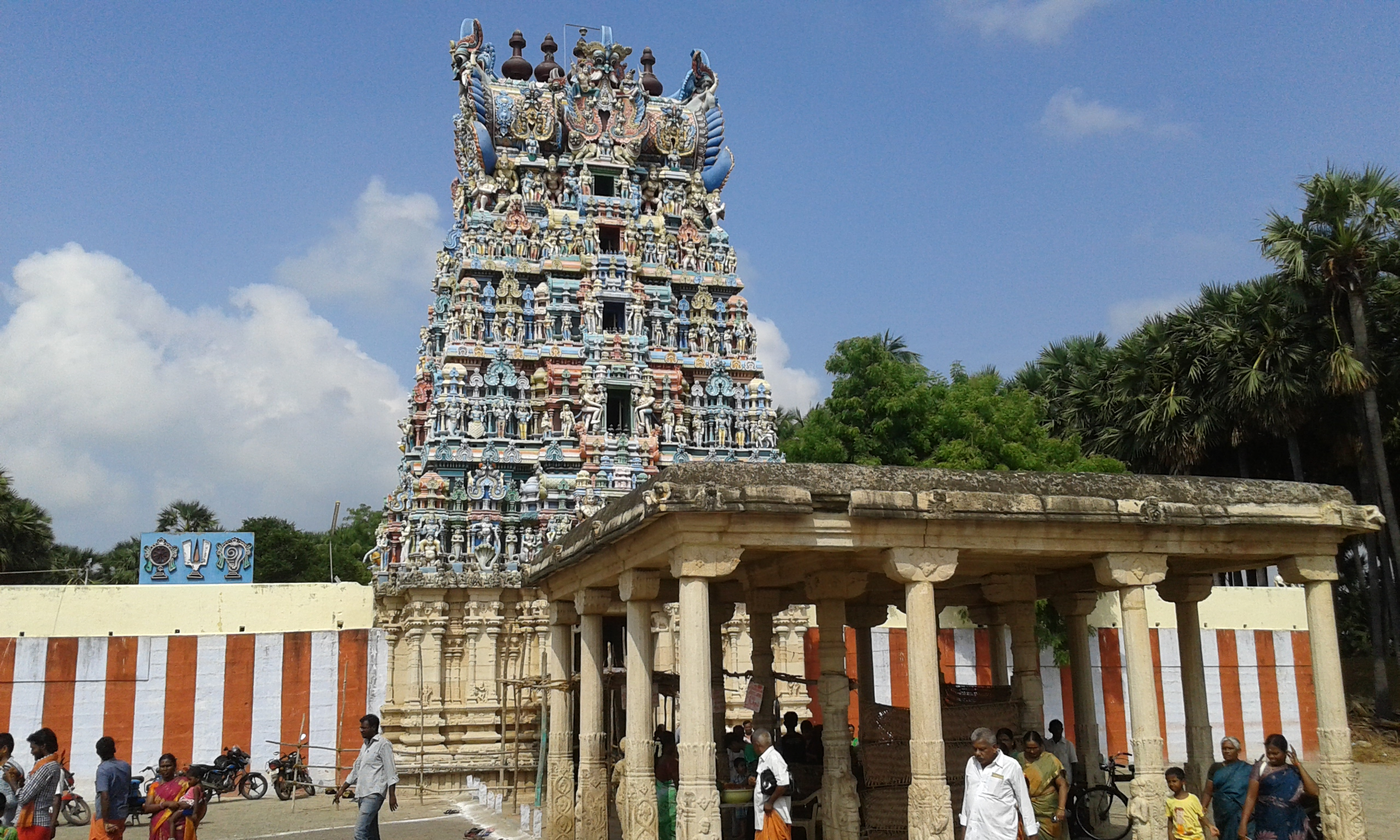

- Location in Tamil Nadu

Religion
- Affiliation: Hinduism
- District: Thoothukudi
- Deity: Vijayasana Perumal (Vishnu); Varagunavalli (Lakshmi)
- Features: Tower: Vijaykotti; Temple tank: Agni

Location
- Location: Natham
- State: Tamil Nadu
- Country: India
- Interactive map of Thiruvaragunamangai Perumal Temple
- Coordinates: 8°38′13.4″N 77°55′26.9″E

Architecture
- Type: Dravidian architecture
- Elevation: 449 m (1,473 ft)

Thiruvaragunamangai Perumal Temple (also called Vijayasana Perumal) is one of the Nava Tirupati, the nine Hindu temples dedicated to Vishnu located in the Tiruchendur-Tirunelveli route, Tamil Nadu, India in the banks of Thamiraparani river. All these 9 temples are classified as Divya Desams, the 108 temples of Vishnu revered by the 12 poet-saints of the Sri Vaishnava tradition, called the Alvars. The temple at Natham also known as Chandran Sthalam, the second of the Nava Tirupatis. Constructed in the Dravidian style of architecture, the temple is dedicated to Vishnu who is worshipped as Vijayasana Perumal and Lakshmi as Varagunavalli.

A granite wall surrounds the temple, enclosing all its shrines. The rajagopuram, the temple's gateway tower has five tiers. The temple follows Tenkalai tradition of worship. Six daily rituals and three yearly festivals are held at the temple, of which the ten-day annual Vaikuntha Ekadashi during the Tamil month of Margali (December - January) and the Nammalvar birth celebrations with Garudasevai with all nine temple of Nava Tirupati, being the most prominent. The temple is maintained and administered by the Hindu Religious and Endowment Board of the Government of Tamil Nadu.

== Etymology ==
The etymology of this temple is said to come from the deity Varagunamangai, who is believed to have granted his theophany to a Brahmin who was a Vedic scholar. This is referred to in one of the poems of Nammalvar. It is generally assumed that Varagunamangai traces his name to the monarch Varaguna Pandya, though this is uncertain.

== Legend ==
Vishnu is said here appeared in this temple to answer the prayer of the sage Romesar, who performed severe penances for several thousand years.

As per another legend, a sage named Vedavit was living along the banks of the Tamarabarani river and was serving his elderly parents. After the death of his parents, he wanted to perform a penance. Vishnu appeared in the form of a Brahmin and advised him to perform penance at Varagunamangai. After several years of penance, pleased by the devotion of Vedavit, Vishnu appeared before him. Vedavit requested Vishnu to appear as Vijaysanan at this place.

== Architecture ==
The temple is located in Tiruchendur-Tirunelveli route, Tamil Nadu, India in the banks of Thamiraparani river, in the South Indian state of Tamil Nadu. The temple is constructed in Dravidian style of architecture. All the shrines of the temple are enclosed in a rectangular granite structure, which is pierced by a five-tiered gopuram (gateway tower). There is a sixteen pillared granite hall in front of the gopuram. The sanctum houses the image of Vijayasana Perumal in sitting posture, flanked by both his consorts on either side. The festival images of Vijayasanar and Varagunavalli are located inside the sanctum. The temple is maintained and administered by the Hindu Religious and Endowment Board of the Government of Tamil Nadu.

== Festival ==
The Garuda Sevai utsavam (festival) in the month of Vaikasi (May-Jun) witnesses 9 Garudasevai, a spectacular event in which festival image idols from the Nava Tirupatis shrines in the area are brought on Garuda vahana (sacred vehicle). An idol of Nammalvar is also brought here on an Anna Vahanam (palanquin) and his pasurams (verses) dedicated to each of these 9 temples are recited. The utsavar (festival deity) of Nammalvar is taken in a palanquin to each of the 9 temples, through the paddy fields in the area. The pasurams (poems) dedicated to each of the 9 Divya Desams are chanted in the respective shrines. This is the most important of the festivals in this area, and it draws thousands of visitors.

The temple follows the traditions of the Tenkalai sect of Vaishnava tradition and follows Pancharathra aagama. The temple priests perform the pooja (rituals) during festivals and on a daily basis. As at other Vishnu temples of Tamil Nadu, the priests belong to the Vaishnava community, from the Brahmin class. The temple rituals are performed six times a day: Kalasanthi at 8:00 a.m., Uchikalam at 12:00 p.m., Sayarakshai at 6:00 p.m., and Ardha Jamam at 8:00 p.m. Each ritual has three steps: alangaram (decoration), neivethanam (food offering) and deepa aradanai (waving of lamps) for both Vijayasana Perumal and Varagunavalli. During the last step of worship, nadasvaram (pipe instrument) and tavil (percussion instrument) are played, religious instructions in the Vedas (sacred text) are recited by priests, and worshippers prostrate themselves in front of the temple mast. There are weekly, monthly and fortnightly rituals performed in the temple.

== Religious significance ==
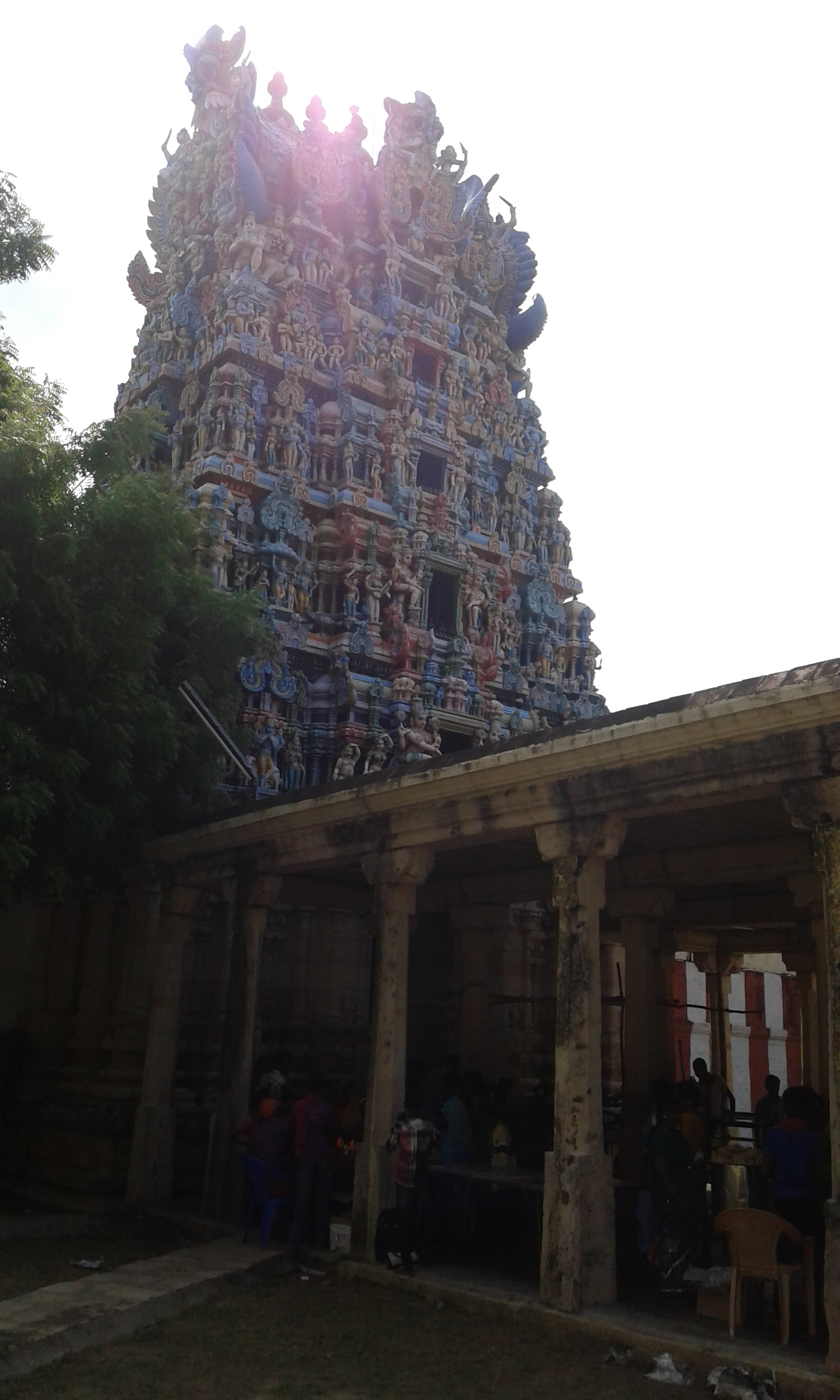
Image of the gopuram from inside the temple

Brahmanda Purana one of the eighteen sacred texts of Hinduism and written by Veda Vyasa contains a chapter called Navathirupathi Mahatmeeyam. Vaikunta Mahatmeeyam is another work in Sanskrit that glorifies the temple and is a part of Tamraparani Sthalapurana available only in palm manuscripts. The temple is revered in the Nalayira Divya Prabandham, the 7th–9th-century-CE Sri Vaishnava canon, contributed to by Nammalvar. The temple is classified as a Divya Desam, one of the 108 Vishnu temples that are mentioned in the book. The temple is also classified as a Nava Tirupati, the nine temples revered by Nammalvar located in the banks of Tamiraparani river. The temple is next only to Alwarthirunagari Temple in terms of importance among the nine Nava Tirupati temple. Nammalvar makes a reference about the temple in his work named Tiruvaymoli. During the 18th and 19th centuries, the temple finds mention in several works like 108 Tirupati Antati by Divya Kavi Pillai Perumal Aiyangar. The temple also forms a series of Navagraha temples where each of the nine planetary deities of one of the temples of Nava Tirupati. The temple is associated with Chandra (the moon god).
