= Somangalam Sundararaja Perumal Temple =

Hindu temple in Kanchipuram district, Tamil Nadu, India

- Sundararaja Perumal Temple, Somangalam, Kanchipuram, Tamil Nadu

Religion
- Affiliation: Hinduism
- District: Kanchipuram
- Deity: Sundararaja Perumal
- Festivals: Vaikuntha Ekadashi, Aani Thirumanchanam, Garuda seva

Location
- Location: Somangalam
- State: Tamil Nadu
- Country: India
- Interactive map of Somangalam Sundararaja Perumal Temple
- Coordinates: 12.944963°N 80.035979°E

Architecture
- Type: Dravidian architecture

Specifications
- Temple: One
- Elevation: 38.04 m (125 ft)

Sundararaja Perumal Temple is a Perumal temple situated at Somangalam neighbourhood in Kanchipuram district of Tamil Nadu state in India. This temple is constructed about 950 years ago.

== Location ==
This temple is located with the coordinates of 12.944963°N 80.035979°E

Somangalam Sundararaja Perumal Temple (Tamil Nadu)

== Festival ==
As celebrated every year, Thirumanjana abhishekam for the main deity, on 25 June 2023 and Garudaseva events on 26 June 2023 were held in this temple.
