= Somangalam Somanatheeswarar Temple =

Hindu temple in Kanchipuram district, Tamil Nadu, India

- Somanatheeswarar Temple, Somangalam, Kanchipuram, Tamil Nadu

Religion
- Affiliation: Hinduism
- District: Kanchipuram
- Deity: Somanatheeswarar
- Festival: Maha Shivaratri

Location
- Location: Somangalam
- State: Tamil Nadu
- Country: India
- Interactive map of Somangalam Somanatheeswarar Temple
- Coordinates: 12.945135°N 80.038025°E

Architecture
- Type: Dravidian architecture
- Creator: Kulothunga Chollha
- Completed: 1073

Specifications
- Temple: One
- Inscriptions: Chollha, Pandiya, Vijayanagara inscriptions
- Elevation: 35.87 m (118 ft)

Somanatheeswarar Temple is a Shiva temple at Somangalam in Kanchipuram of Tamil Nadu state in India.

== Location ==
This temple is located with the coordinates of (12.945135°N 80.038025°E) at Somangalam in Kanchipuram district.

Somangalam Somanatheeswarar Temple (Tamil Nadu)

== Details ==
The main deity in this temple is Somanatheeswarar and goddess is Meenakshi amman. This temple was built in the year about 1073 A.D. by Kulothunga Chollha.

== Sanctum sanctorum ==
The sanctum sanctorum of this temple is in Gajaprishtam shape which means it appears as the back of an elephant in sleeping posture.

== Inscriptions ==
Inscriptions of Rajadhiraja Chollha II in the year 1174 CE, inscriptions of Kulothunga Chollha III in the year 1192 CE, inscriptions of Kulothunga Chollha III in the years 1206 & 1207 CEs, inscriptions of Kulothunga Chollha III in the year 1209 CE, inscriptions of Rajaraja Chollha III in the year 1223 CE, inscriptions of Jatavarma Pandiya I in the years 1260, 1261, 1262 & 1263 CEs and inscriptions of Mallikarjuna (Vijayanagara king) in the 15th century CE are found in this temple.

== Sub deities ==
Vishnu, Brahma, Dakshinamurthy, Durga, Ganesha, Balavinayagar, Balamurugan, Balasubramanian, Subramaniar with Valli and Devasena, Nandeeswarar, Sun, Moon, Chandikeswarar and Navagraha are the sub deities in this temple.
