= Mangala =

Deity of Planet Mars

- God of the planet Mars
- Member of Navagraha
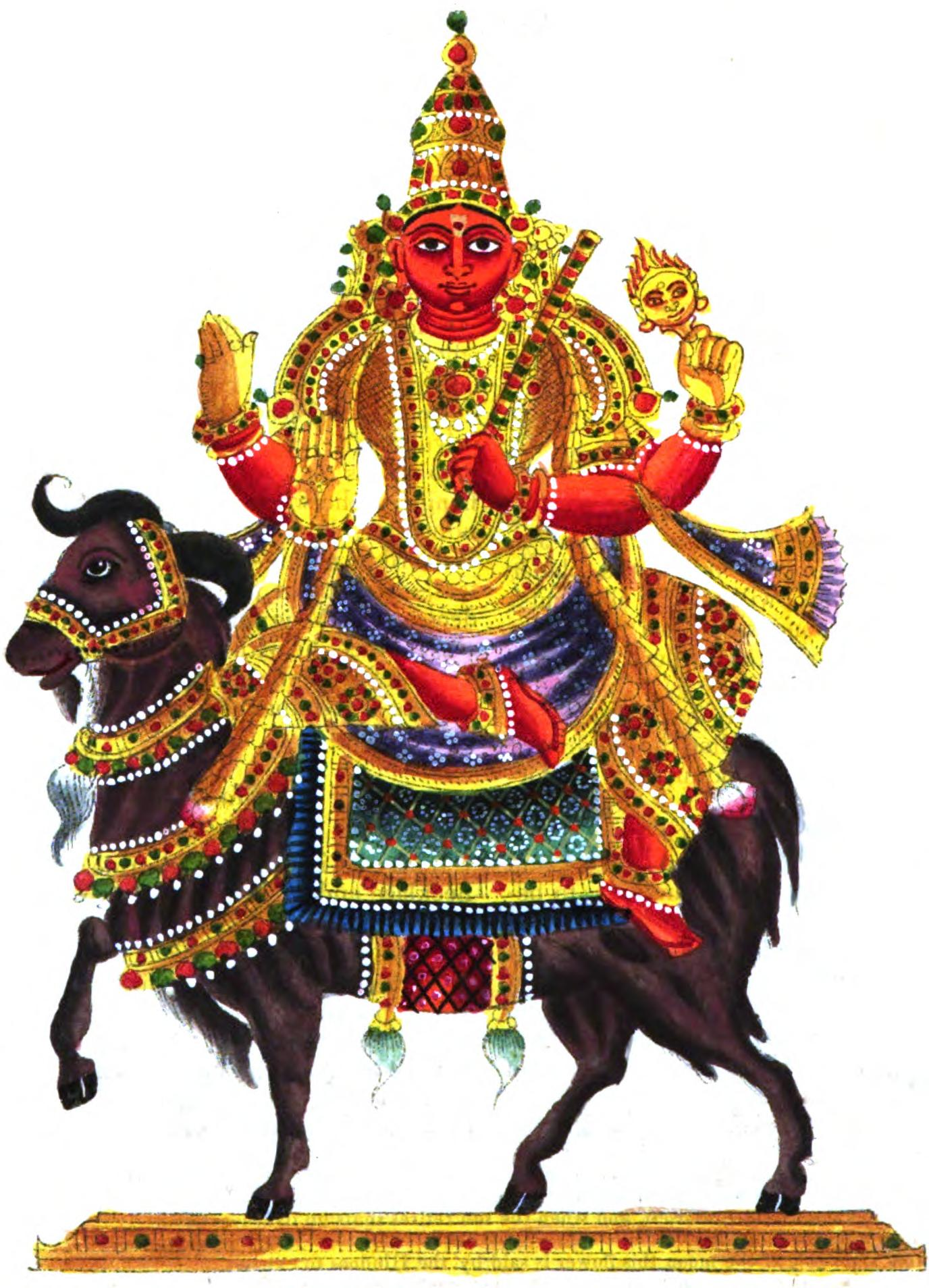
- Mangala riding on his mount ram
- Devanagari: मंगल
- Sanskrit transliteration: Mangala
- Affiliation: Graha, Deva, Vaishnavism
- Abode: Mangalaloka
- Planet: Mars
- Mantra: Om Mangala Devaya Namah
- Day: Tuesday
- Colour: Red
- Number: 9, 18, and 27
- Mount: Ram
- Parents: Mother: Bhumi; Father: Vishnu as Varaha (in Vaishnava tradition) or Shiva (in Shaiva tradition)
- Consort: Medha (according to Brahma Vaivarta Purana)

Mangala (Sanskrit: मङ्गल, IAST: Maṅgala) is the personification, as well as the name for the planet Mars, in Hindu literature. Also known as Lohita (lit. 'the red one'), he is the deity of anger, aggression, as well as war. According to Vaishnavism, he is the son of Bhumi, the earth goddess, and Vishnu, born when the latter raised her from the depths of the primordial waters in his Varaha avatar. According to Shaivism, he was born from the god Shiva through a drop of his blood or sweat.

== Nomenclature ==
Mars (Mangala) is also called:

- Raktavarna (रक्तवर्ण) - whose color is like blood.
- Bhauma (भौम) - son of Bhumi.
- Lohitānga (लोहिताङ्ग) - red bodied (Loha also means Iron, so could also mean Iron Bodied).
- Kuja (कुज) - he who is born from Earth.
- Bha (भ) - shining.
- Dharāputra (धरापुत्र) - son of Dharā.

== Iconography ==
He is painted red or flame colour, four-armed, carrying a trident (Sanskrit: trishūla), mace (Sanskrit: gadā), lotus (Sanskrit: Padma), and a spear (Sanskrit: shūla). His mount (Sanskrit: vahana) is a ram. He presides over Tuesday.

== Legend ==
Mangala appears in the narrative of the Varaha avatar of Vishnu. When the king of the asuras, Hiranyaksha, abducts the goddess of the earth, Bhumi, Vishnu assumes his third avatar, and descends upon the earth to rescue her. Observing that the asura had dragged her deep within the primordial waters, he catches the goddess with his tusks, and successfully slays the asura, restoring her to her rightful place in the cosmos. As she rises, Vishnu realises that Bhumi is, in fact, an aspect of his consort, Lakshmi, and proceeds to sport with her, and from this union is born Mangala, meaning the auspicious one.

According to Shaivism, once when Shiva was engrossed in meditation on Mount Kailash, three drops of perspiration from his forehead fell on Earth. From those drops was born a beautiful infant with a reddish complexion and four arms. Shiva handed the child to Mother Earth for upbringing. Brought up by Bhumi, the child was named Bhauma.

== Literature ==
The word Mangala is ancient, first appearing in the Rigveda (2nd millennium BCE), and mentioned by grammarian Patanjali (~2nd century BCE), but not as an astrological term, rather to mean "auspicious-successful" (siddha) structure in literary arts. Panini too mentions it in verse I.3.1 in a similar context. In the Vedic texts, states Christopher Minkowski, there is no mention of auspicious rituals, or auspicious start or timing of a ritual, rather the "mangala" as auspicious practices likely emerged in the Indian traditions during the medieval era (after mid 1st millennium CE), thereafter found in Hinduism, Buddhism and Jainism. The ritualistic Mimamsa school of Hinduism did not include any mangala (auspicious) verses, related to plane "Mangala" in any of its text throughout the 1st millennium CE.

The Markandeya Purana contains the astrological Mangala Kavacha Stotram, which includes a prayer to be recited to Mangala for seeking protection.

== Astrology and worship ==
Jyotisha, the tradition of Hindu astrology, includes Mangala in the concept of Nakshatra (see also List of Nakshathra temples ), Navagraha (see also List of Navagraha temples), and Saptarishi. He is included in the list of Hindu deities, whose dedicated temples are found at various Hindu pilgrimage sites, to which Hindus perform their pilgrimage, called yatra.

== Planet ==
Mangala, as a planet, appears in various Hindu astronomical texts in Sanskrit, such as the 5th century Aryabhatiya by Aryabhata, the 6th century Romaka by Latadeva and Panca Siddhantika by Varahamihira, the 7th century Khandakhadyaka by Brahmagupta and the 8th century Sisyadhivrddida by Lalla. These texts present Mangala as one of the planets and estimate the characteristics of the respective planetary motion. Other texts such as Surya Siddhanta dated to have been complete sometime between the 5th century and 10th century present their chapters on various planets with deity mythologies.

The manuscripts of these texts exist in slightly different versions, present Mangala's motion in the skies, but vary in their data, suggesting that the text were open and revised over their lives.

The 1st millennium CE Hindu scholars had estimated the time it took for sidereal revolutions of each planet including Mangala, from their astronomical studies, with slightly different results:

Sanskrit and other texts: How many days for Mangala (Mars) to complete its orbit?
Source	Estimated time per sidereal revolution
Surya Siddhanta	686 days, 23 hours, 56 minutes, 23.5 seconds
Siddhanta Shiromani	686 days, 23 hours, 57 minutes, 1.5 seconds
Ptolemy	686 days, 23 hours, 31 minutes, 56.1 seconds
20th century calculations	686 days, 23 hours, 30 minutes, 41.4 seconds

== Calendar and zodiac ==
Mangala is the root of the word 'Mangalavara' or Tuesday in the Hindu calendar. The word मंगल also means "auspicious" but the planet मंगल is considered malefic.

Similarly, the names of Tuesday in other Indo-European languages are often derived from the Roman god Mars, (such as the Latin word Martis "Tuesday") or a god ascribed with similar characteristics. The root of the English word Tuesday, for instance, is the old Germanic god of war and victory, Tīw, also known as Týr.

Mangala is part of the Navagraha in Hindu zodiac system. The role and importance of the Navagraha developed over time with various influences. The earliest work of astrology recorded in India is the Vedanga Jyotisha which began to be compiled in the 14th century BCE.

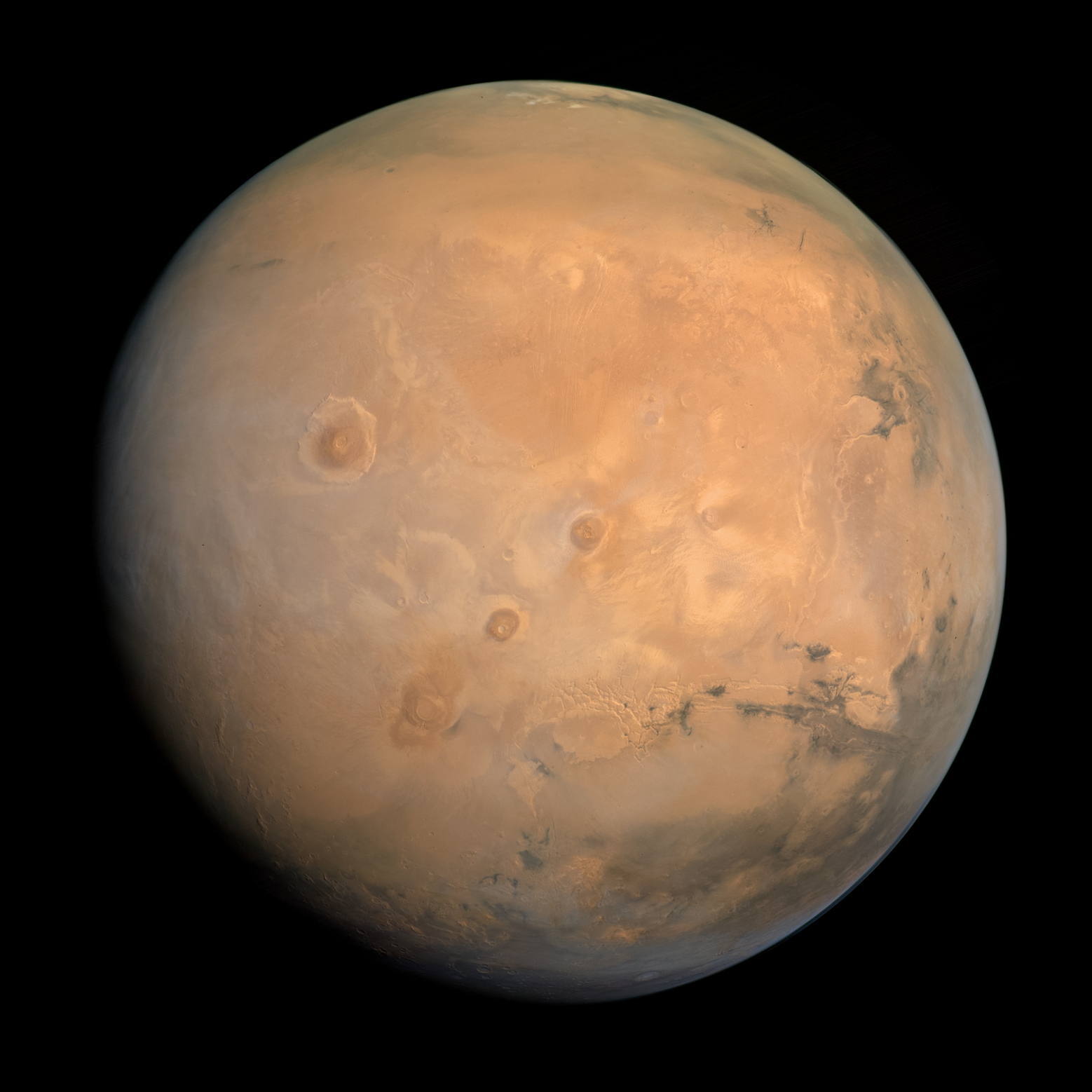
The planet Mars

Deifying planetary bodies and their astrological significance occurred as early as the Vedic period and was recorded in the Vedas. The classical planets, including Mars, were referenced in the Atharvaveda from the second millennium BCE. The Navagraha was furthered by additional contributions from Western Asia, including Zoroastrian and Hellenistic influences. The Yavanajataka, or 'Science of the Yavanas', was written by the Indo-Greek named "Yavanesvara" ("Lord of the Greeks") under the rule of the Western Kshatrapa king Rudrakarman I. The Yavanajataka written in 120 CE is often attributed to standardizing Indian astrology. The Navagraha would further develop and culminate in the Shaka era with the Saka, or Scythian, people. Additionally the contributions by the Saka people would be the basis of the Indian national calendar, which is also called the Saka calendar.

== See also ==
- Jyotisha
- Navagraha
  - List of Navagraha temples
- Nakshatra
  - List of Natchathara temples
  - Saptarishi
- List of Hindu deities
- List of Hindu temples
- List of Hindu pilgrimage sites
- Murugan
