= Somangalam =

Neighbourhood in Kanchipuram district, Tamil Nadu, India

- Neighbourhood
- Somangalam, Kanchipuram, Tamil Nadu
- Coordinates: 12.9524°N 80.0409°E
- Country: India
- State: Tamil Nadu
- District: Kanchipuram
- Elevation: 42.95 m (140.9 ft)

Languages
  - Official: Tamil, English
  - Speech: Tamil, English
- Time zone: UTC+5:30 (IST)
- PIN: 600069
- Telephone code: +9144********
- Other Neighbourhoods: Thandalam, Sirukalathur, Naduveerapattu, Kundrathur, Poonthandalam, Nandambakkam
- Corporation: Kancheepuram City Municipal Corporation
- LS: Sriperumbudur
- VS: Sriperumbudur

Somangalam is a neighbourhood in Kanchipuram, of Tamil Nadu state in India.

== Location ==
Somangalam is located with the coordinates of (12.9524°N 80.0409°E) near Kundrathur with two temples viz., Somanatheeswarar Temple and Sundararaja Perumal Temple.

Somangalam (Tamil Nadu)

== Demographics ==
As per 2011 census of India, the total population of Somangalam neighbourhood is 4376, out of which 2199 are males and 2177 are females.

== Religion ==
Somanatheeswarar Temple is situated here at Somangalam. Also a Perumal temple viz., Sundararaja Perumal Temple is situated at Somangalam.

== Politics ==
Somangalam area falls under the Sriperumbudur Assembly constituency. Also, this area belongs to Sriperumbudur Lok Sabha constituency.
