= Sthala purana =

Religious account of a Hindu temple and its site

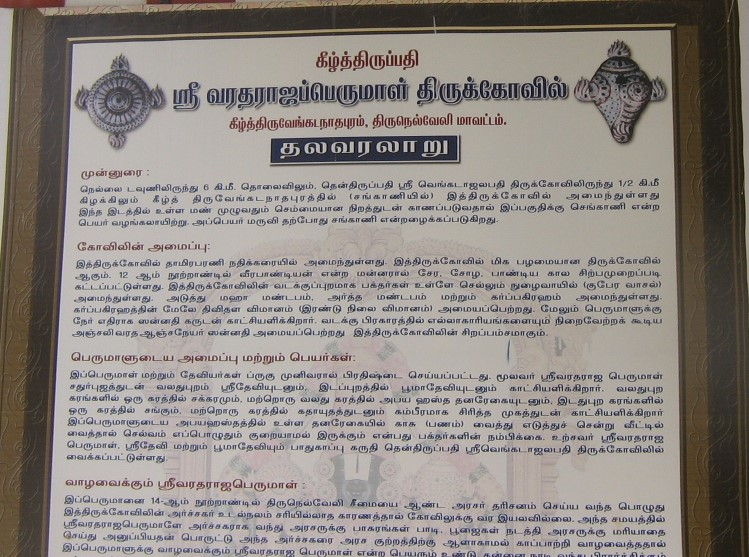
The sthala purana (tala valararu) of Varadharaja Perumal Temple, Thiruvenkatanathapuram, Tirunelveli, written in Tamil outside the shrine.

A sthala purana or sthala puranam (Sanskrit: स्थलपुराणम्, romanized: sthalapurāṇam, lit. 'regional history') refers to a religious account that recounts the historical significance of a Hindu temple, or the sacredness of the region in which it is situated. It is sometimes referred to as a eulogistic work that glorifies a sacred site. The name of a given place and the temple present in a sthala purana traditionally has a religious or a historical association, with some major event surrounding it.

== Etymology ==
Sthala Purana comes from the Sanskrit terms Sthala, meaning, 'place', and Purana, meaning, 'history'. A Sthala Purana serves to offer information regarding the events associated with a given place, which is usually a temple.

== Description ==
Sthala Puranas were historically transmitted orally, traditionally by the priests of a Hindu temple, who would recount the account during puja. They were also sometimes preserved in manuscripts, usually included in works of religious literature. In the contemporary period, these accounts are often offered in printed pamphlets, or summarised on websites on the Internet.

Such accounts offer narratives regarding how the murti (a representation of the deity that is worshipped) of a temple came to be in that place, either as a svayambhu (self-manifestation), a miraculous discovery, acts of the deity performed at the given site, or how a saint or devotee was blessed by the deity in the site. They may also explain the relationship between the mulavar (main deity) housed in the temple, and the murtis of other deities also enshrined within. The forms of ritual worship that are prescribed to be performed at a given temple, and the punya (virtue) one would be rewarded with for engaging in worship at the site are also often detailed. Such accounts generally extol the glory of one deity in particular, and regard the veneration of that deity to be most virtuous.

Sthala Puranas are categorised along three main themes: tirtha (sacredness of a site), khestra (a geographic area or place), and daivata (deity). Sthala Puranas form part of wider pilgrimage literature that explains the origins of sacred places and the spiritual merit associated with visiting them.

== Traditions ==
Sthala Puranas are found more often in South India, where the dominant Hindu traditions are Vaishnavism and Shaivism. Accordingly, most of these chronicles offer veneration to Vishnu or Shiva in their contents. In Tamil Nadu, Sthala Puranas are rendered Tala Valaraṟu (Tamil: தல வரலாறு), and are generally transmitted in Tamil.

Vaishnava Sthala Puranas are primarily associated with the Sri Vaishnava tradition, to which the twelve poet-saints, the Alvars, belonged to. Each of the Divya Desams, the 108 sacred abodes of Vishnu, scattered throughout India, has a Sthala Purana associated with it. The Alvars are regarded to have visited and extolled these shrines, their hymns compiled in the Sri Vaishnava canon, called the Naalayira Divya Prabandham.

Shaiva chronicles of this genre tell of the origins and traditions of particular Tamil Shiva temples or shrines. There are numerous Sthala Puranas, most written in the vernacular, but some with Sanskrit versions as well. The 275 Shiva Sthalams of the continent have such Puranas for each, famously glorified in the Tamil literary work Tevaram. Some appear in Sanskrit versions in the Mahapuranas or Upapuranas. Some Tamil Sthala Puranas have been researched by David Dean Shulman.

== Examples ==
- The Sthala Purana of the Alagiya Manavalan Perumal temple in Uraiyur (Woraiyur), now part of Tiruchirappali, and known as Thirukkoli, describes the tale behind the existence of temple.
- The Sthala Purana of the Srivilliputhur Andal temple is significant due to its influence on Ramanuja.
- The Sthala Purana of the region of Thiruvottiyur (Chennai), one of the oldest habitations by the sea, during the 16th century, describes it as one of the greener places in the region.
- The Sthala Purana of Mumbai is believed to have been derived from goddess belonging to Koli community, Mumba devi, who are considered as the initial inhabitants of the islands in city.
- The Sthala Purana of the Sthalasayana Perumal temple at Mamallapuram highlights the story of the lotus- offering to Vishnu in that place.
- The Sthala Purana of the city of Kumbhakonam indicates the place as being surrounded by villages, which are jointly linked, with a legendary story relating to cosmogony.
- The Sthala Purana of the Meenakshi Amman Temple highlights that Meenakshi Amma was believed to be found by the king of the devas, Indra.
- The Sthala Purana of the Sri Varaha Lakshmi Narasimha Swamy Vari Devasthanam Temple in Simhachalam relates the temple to the asura king known as Hiranyakashipu, and his son, Prahlada.
- The Sthala Purana of the Yadagirigutta Narasimha Swamy temple is said to be dated back to the Treta Yugam.
- The Sthala Purana of places in Nalgonda gives ancient details of the Sri Meenakshi Agasteswara Swamy Temple.

== See also ==
- Puranas
- Tirtha
- Divya Desam

== Sources ==
- Eck, Diana L. (2012). India: A Sacred Geography. Harmony Books. ISBN 978-0-385-53190-0.
- Shulman, David Dean (1980). Tamil Temple Myths: Sacrifice and Divine Marriage in the South Indian Saiva Tradition. Princeton University Press.
