= Kumbakonam Betel Leaf =

Commercial crop grown in Tamil Nadu, India

- Geographical indication
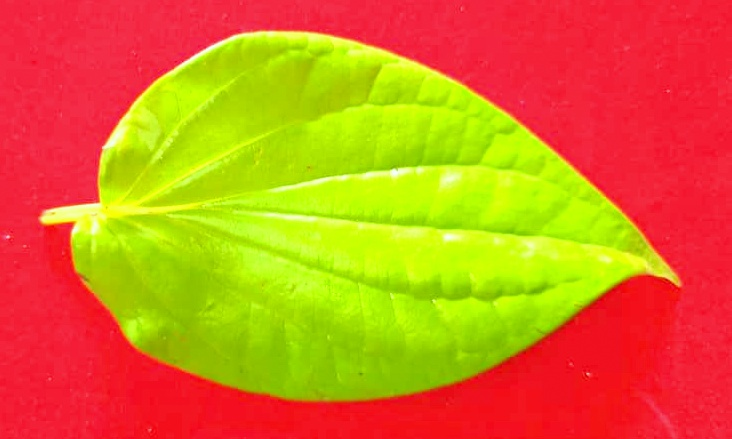
- Kumbakonam Betel Leaf, a GI product
- Description: Betel leaf variety cultivated in Kumbakonam, Tamil Nadu, India
- Type: Betel leaf
- Area: Kumbakonam and in the nearby areas of Ayyampettai, Rajagiri, Pandaravadai, Swamimalai, and Evur
- Country: India
- Registered: 31 March 2025
- Official website: ipindia.gov.in

Kumbakonam Betel Leaf is a commercial crop cultivated in the Thanjavur district areas of the Cauvery delta in Tamil Nadu, Southern India. It is the first agricultural product from this region to receive Geographical Indication (GI) status and the third variety of betel leaf in Tamil Nadu to receive GI status.

== Description ==
Kumbakonam Betel Leaf is cultivated in Kumbakonam and in the nearby areas of Ayyampettai, Rajagiri, Pandaravadai, Swamimalai, and Evur. This betel leaf, which grows along the Cauvery river banks, in Kumbakonam, and in the Thanjavur regions, is known for its taste, which ranges from a dark color to a light green hue. An old record in the Indian Geographical Indication (GI) Office in Chennai states that the soil type in Kumbakonam is very natural, and the area has a good drainage system, which helps in the abundant cultivation of the betel leaf. Kumbakonam betel leaves are pungent (spicy) and have a bitter taste mixed with sweetness. They contain several bio-molecules that exhibit pharmacological activity, along with carminative properties.

== Legacy ==
Kumbakonam in Thanjavur district is famous for its temples and its betel leaf. In the early 1900s, the Mahakavi Bharathiyar wrote about the greatness of the Kumbakonam betel leaf in his poem, saying, "We shall exchange the wheat of the Ganges river region for the betel leaf of the Cauvery" (referring to the betel leaf from this region). The fame of the Kumbakonam betel leaf is also spoken about in old Tamil film songs and in Gaana songs.

== Geographical Indication (GI) ==
Kumbakonam Betel Leaf was granted Geographical Indication (GI) status on March 31, 2025, by the Geographical Indication Registry under the Government of India. This status is valid until October 12, 2032.

The Tamil Nadu Centre for Agricultural and Rural Development Studies and the Kumbakonam Betel Leaf Producers Welfare Association jointly proposed the GI registration for Kumbakonam Betel Leaf on January 13, 2022. The GI tag was granted by the Geographical Indications Registry in Chennai after reviewing the application. Consequently, the name "Kumbakonam Betel Leaf" has been exclusively reserved for the betel leaf cultivated in this region. This makes it the third variety of betel leaf from Tamil Nadu to receive GI status, after Athur Betel Leaf and Sholavandan Betel Leaf, and the 62nd product overall from Tamil Nadu to receive a GI tag.

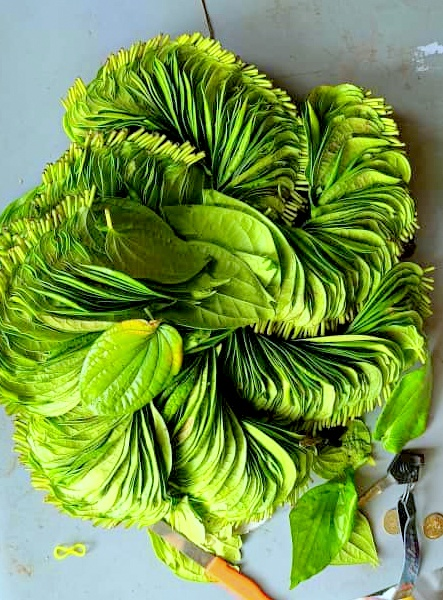
Kumbakonam Betel leaves in a stall

The valuable geographical identification provided by the GI registration certifies that a product possesses unique qualities, follows traditional production methods, and has a reputation rooted in its geographical origin.

== See also ==
- Banaras Pan
- Magahi Paan
- Tirur Betel Leaf
- Authoor Vetrilai
- Sholavandan Vetrilai
