= Mahoba Desawari Pan =

Type of Betel leaf variety from Uttar Pradesh & Madhya Pradesh, India

- Geographical indication
- Description: Betel leaf variety cultivated in Uttar Pradesh & Madhya Pradesh, India
- Type: Betel leaf
- Area: Mahoba district of Uttar Pradesh and parts of adjacent Chhatarpur district of Madhya Pradesh
- Country: India
- Registered: 14 September 2021
- Official website: ipindia.gov.in

Mahoba Desawari Pan is an important traditional crop variety of Betel leaf cultivated in the Indian states of Uttar Pradesh and Madhya Pradesh. It is mainly cultivated in the Mahoba district of Uttar Pradesh and parts of adjacent Chhatarpur district of Madhya Pradesh.

Under its Geographical Indication tag, it is referred to as "Mahoba Desawari Pan".

== Name ==
It is named after its place of origin, the district of Mahoba located in the Bundelkhand region. 'Desawari' refers to the variety grown in this region while "Pan" means "betel leaf" in the local state language of Hindi.

== Description ==
The Desawari cultivar has four sub-types: Desi, Mahoba, Malawi, and Karuwalli, with Mahoba Desawari being area-specific and notable for its larger leaves compared to Maghai Pan, and has been a long-standing tradition in the Mahoba area. This variety is renowned globally for its distinctive crisp taste. The Chaurasia community has cultivated this betel vine variety with expertise for generations.

The leaves of Mahoba Desawari are not only prized for their flavor but also hold sacred significance, as evidenced by a recent shipment sent from Mahoba to Ayodhya for the consecration ceremony of the Ram temple.

== Geographical indication ==
It was awarded the Geographical Indication (GI) status tag from the Geographical Indications Registry, under the Union Government of India, on 14 September 2021 which is valid up to 4 February 2023.

Chaurasiya Samaj Sewa Samiti from Mahoba, proposed the GI registration of 'Mahoba Desawari Pan'. After filing the application in February 2013, the Betel leaf was granted the GI tag in 2021 by the Geographical Indication Registry in Chennai, making the name "Mahoba Desawari Pan" exclusive to the Betel leaf cultivated in the region. It thus became the second Betel leaf variety from India after Mysore Betel Leaf and the 36th type of goods from Uttar Pradesh along with being the 12th type of goods from Madhya Pradesh to earn the GI tag.

The prestigious GI tag, awarded by the GI registry, certifies that a product possesses distinct qualities, adheres to traditional production methods, and has earned a reputation rooted in its geographical origin.

== See also ==
- Banaras Pan
- Magahi Paan
- Tirur Betel Leaf
- Authoor Vetrilai
- Sholavandan Vetrilai
