= South Maranthalai =

Village in Tamil Nadu, India

South Maranthalai is a Village in Thoothukudi district in the state of Tamil Nadu, India. Alwarthirunagari block is the nearby panchayat town.

It is located 20 km south of the district headquarters Thoothukudi. 16 km from Alwarthirunagari. It is Located 17 km from Tiruchendur and 681 km from State capital Chennai

As per the administration register, the block number of Alwarthirunagari is 306. The block has 30 villages and This Village belongs to one of the block of the Alwarthirunagari Located in Southern region of Tamil Nadu This Village road connect Suganthalai Panchayat and kurumbur in 5 km

South Maranthalai - Village Overview Gram Panchayat : Suganthalai Block / Tehsil : Alwarthirunagari District : Thoothukkudi State : Tamil Nadu Pincode : 628207 Area : 400 hectares Population : 2010 Households : 325 Nearest Town : Arumuganeri

329.3 Hectare of Land irrigated through Canal for Agriculture which is highest percentage of hectare of Irrigated through canal cultivation in the entire Alwarthirunagari Taluk

Maru Canal also called as Suganthalai Kuttam is the Longest Canal which is situated adjacent to Suganthalai panchayat Road that Connect Kurumbur

Agriculture is the main stay of this Village. Rice, Betel Leaf, Black Lentil Dal Occupies Major percentage in the Cultivation. Productivity of horticultural (Banana) crops were increased by manifold few years. Commercial crop, chillies, coriander cultivated in more areas as well.

There are regular mini buses plying between Vanathirupathi and Authoor which serve travel need of this village. There are many Government and Private buses operate from Authoor to many parts of the Chennai.

Kurumbur Railway station close to the Village distance about 5 km . Chendur Express is the only train connecting Arumuganeri and Kurumbur with Chennai. There are six passenger trains between Tiruchendur and Tirunelveli, two between Tiruchendur and Thoothukudi & two between Tiruchendur and Palani.

The nearest Domestic airport is Tuticorin Airport which is 22 km from the Village . The nearest International Airport is Madurai Airport which is 158 km from it.

The nearest port is Tuticorin Port.
