= Srivaikuntam =

Srivaikuntam Thiruvaikuntam
- Town
- Location in Tamil Nadu, India
- Coordinates: 8.62°N 77.93°E
- Country: India
- State: Tamil Nadu
- District: Thoothukudi

Area
  - Total: 8.3 km^{2} (3.2 sq mi)
- Elevation: 17 m (56 ft)

Population (2001)
  - Total: 16,214
  - Density: 2,000/km^{2} (5,100/sq mi)

Languages
  - Official: Tamil
- Time zone: UTC+5:30 (IST)

Srivaikuntam, also referred to as Thiruvaikuntam, is a panchayat town in Thoothukudi district in the Indian state of Tamil Nadu. It is located on the banks of the river Thamirabarani.

Thiruvaikuntam has a temple dedicated to Vishnu, known as Srivaikuntanathan or as Tiruvaikuntapati, with a lofty gopuram. The Thiruvenkadam Udaiyar Mandapam is rich with sculptures of yalli, elephants and warriors. The Ekadasi Mandapam, which is opened on Vaikunta Ekadasi days, contains sculptures. During the period of conflict between the East India Company forces and Veera Pandiya Kattabomman, the temple served as a fort. The Kailasanathaswamy temple is another important temple and contains six inscriptions of the times of Kattabomman.

== Geography ==
Srivaikuntam is located at 8.63115°N 77.9095017°E. It has an average elevation of 17 metres (55 feet). The town is located on the north bank of the Tamirabarani river. It is 30 km east of Tirunelveli, 30 km west of Tiruchendur and 39 km from Tuticorin.

== Demographics ==
As of 2001 India census, Srivaikuntam had a population of 16,214. Males constituted 48% of the population and females 52%. Tiruvaikuntam had an average literacy rate of 77%, higher than the national average of 59.5%: male literacy was 81%, and female literacy was 72%. In Srivaikuntam, 11% of the population was under 6 years of age. The city and its surroundings has a considerable population of Appanad Maravars and Brahmins (notably Iyengars).

== Landmarks ==
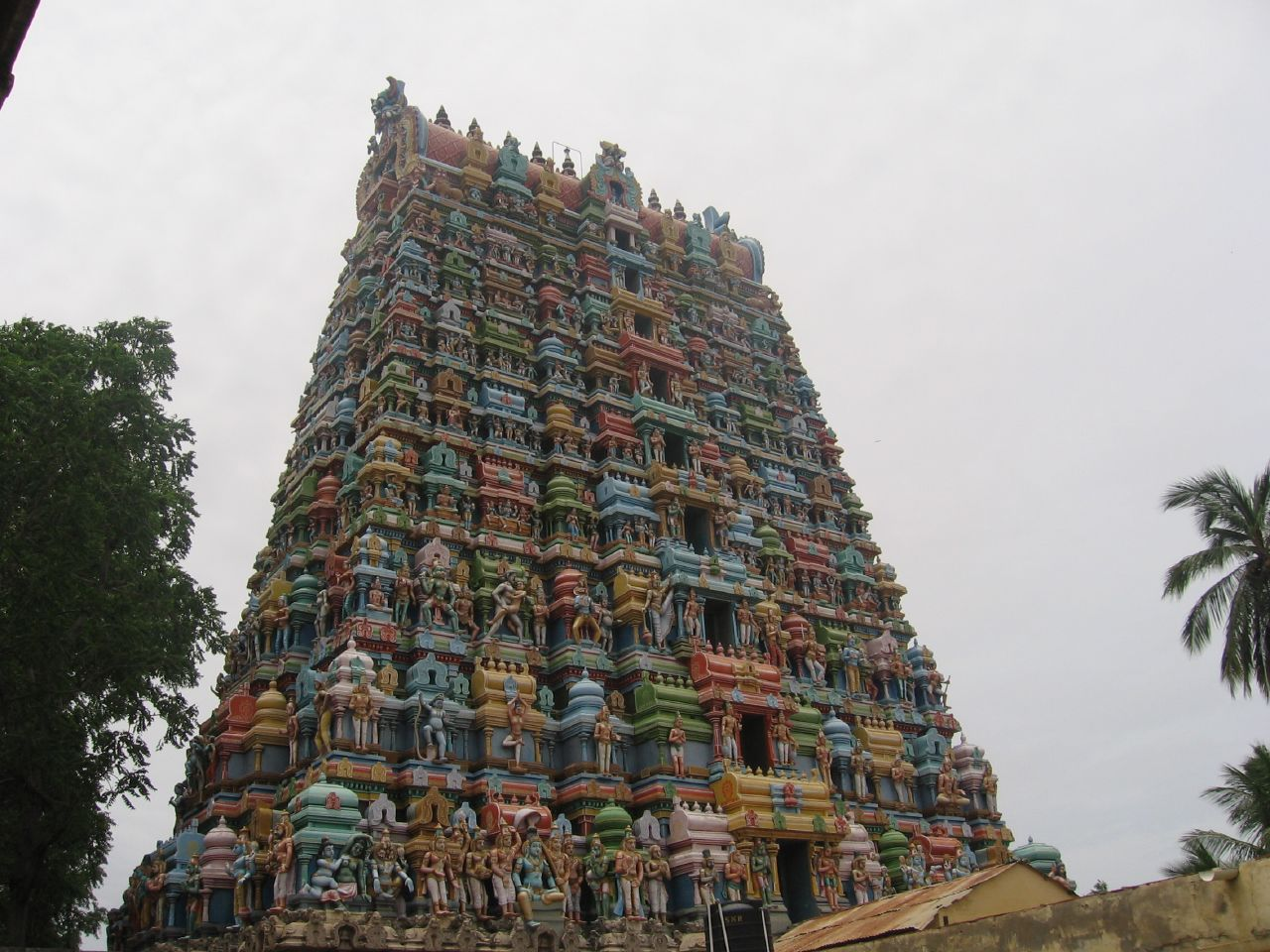
The rajagopuram of Kallapiran temple

- Srivaikuntanathan Perumal temple (Vishnu temple; One of the Nava Tirupati)
- Kailasanathar Temple, Srivaikuntam (Shiva temple; One of the Nava Kailasam)

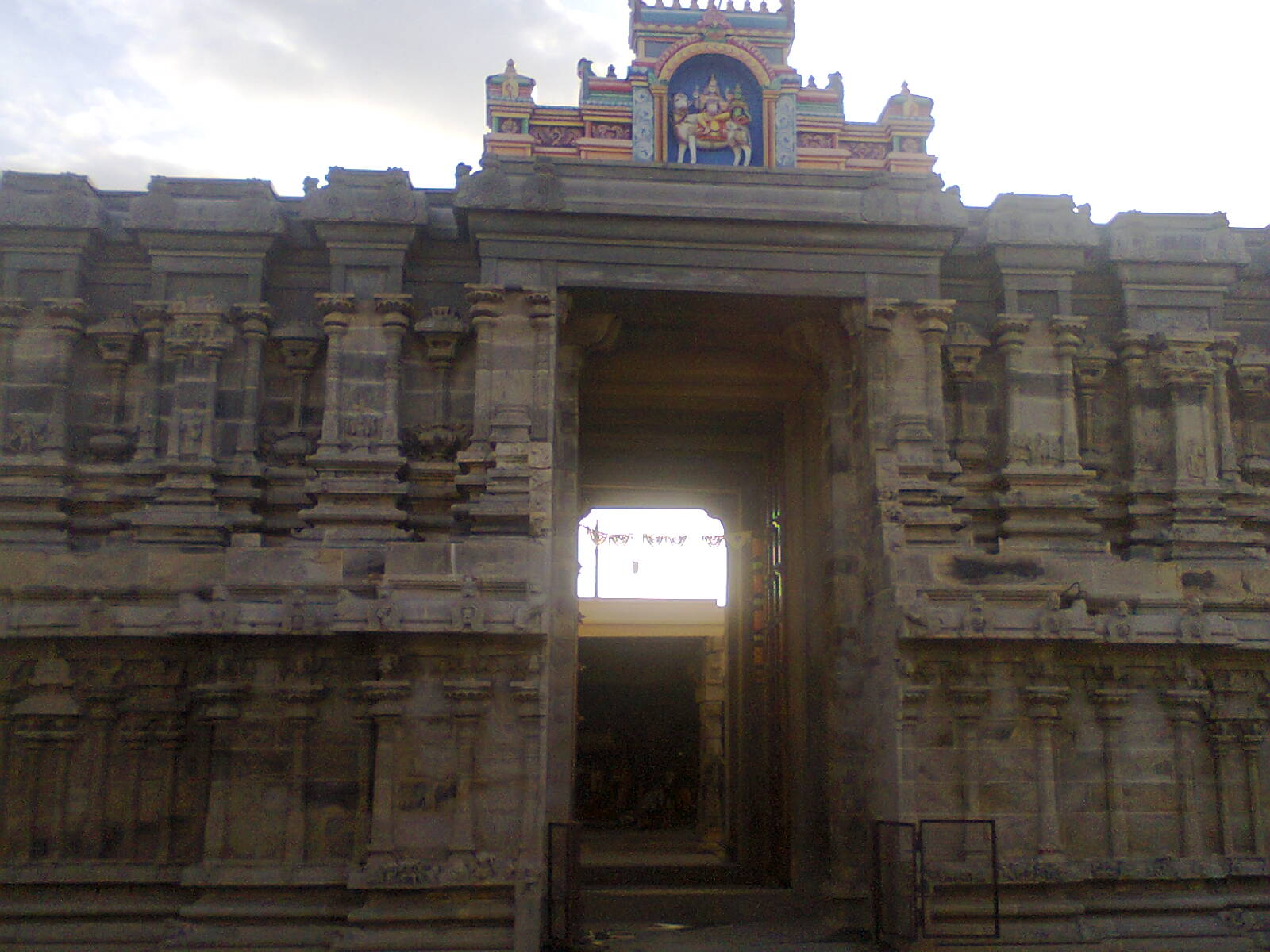
Front view of the Srivaikuntam Kailasanathar temple

== Festivals ==
- Fifth day festival every year April mid (in the Tamil month of Chithirai)
- Ninth day Car festival every year April mid (in the Tamil month of Chithirai)
- Vaikunta Ekadashi between December and January
- Kuruz Kovil (RC Church) Festival from 16 July to 25 July

== Transport ==
Bus services are conducted from Madurai, Tirunelveli, Tiruchendur and Thoothukudi through Srivaikuntam. There is a railway station at Tiruvaikuntam. Nearest air services are 24.6 km away at Thoothukudi.

== Education ==
- Arulmighu Kumara Gurupara Swamigal Arts College, Srivaikuntam
- Arulmighu Kumara Gurupara Swamigal Public Library, Srivaikuntam
- Sri Kumara Gurupara Swamikal Hr Sec School, Srivaikuntam
- Arulmigu Kumara Gurupara Swamikal Government Girls Hr. Sec. School, Srivaikuntam
- TV RamaSubbier Krishnammal Hindu Vidyalaya Matriculation Higher Secondary School, Srivaikuntam
- Hajji Miyan Abdul Cader Middle School, Srivaikuntam
- SDA Mat Hr Sec School, Srivaikuntam
- Sri Kumara Gurupara swamigal primary school, Srivaikuntam
- St James Matriculation School, Srivaikuntam
- Ulagammalanni Niyabahartha Middle School, Srivaikuntam

== See also ==
- Authoor
- Maranthalai
- Pudukkudi West
- Umarikadu
- Vazhavallan
- Vittilapuram
