= Authoor Vetrilai =

Type of Betel leaf variety from Tamil Nadu, India

- Geographical indication
- Description: Betel leaf variety cultivated in Tamil Nadu, India
- Type: Betel leaf
- Area: Authoor and nearby areas of Thoothukudi district
- Country: India
- Registered: 31 March 2023
- Official website: ipindia.gov.in

Authoor Vetrilai is a traditional crop variety of Betel leaf cultivated in the Indian state of Tamil Nadu. It is mainly cultivated in Authoor, Rajapathi, Chokkapalakarai, Maranthalai, Vellakoil, Melaattur, Sernthapoomangalam, Vazhavallan, Korkai and Umarikadu block panchayaths of Thoothukudi district of Tamil Nadu.

Under its Geographical Indication tag, it is referred to as "Authoor Vetrilai".

== Name ==
It is named after its place of origin, the Authoor region. "Vetrilai" means "betel leaf" in the local state language of Tamil.

== Description ==
This variety of betel leaf comes in three distinct variants - Nattukodi, Pachaikodi, and Karpoori. The book "The Travels of Marco Polo (The Venetian)" mentions the use of betel leaves in the city of Kael, which is located just 10 km from Authoor village. Authoor and nearby areas in Thoothukudi district are famous for betel vine cultivation, covering 200 hectares. The Thamirabarani river is the primary source of irrigation. Betel leaves play a significant role in various aspects of life, including food, medicine, social, and religious purposes. They are an essential item in social gatherings, weddings, and festivals. The majority of people in Authoor and nearby areas depend on betel vine cultivation and allied sectors for their livelihood. The farmers of Authoor cultivate several varieties of betel leaves, including 'Chakkai', 'Maaththu', 'Raasi', and 'Sanna Ragam'. However, it's the 'Chakkai' and 'Maaththu' varieties that are in high demand and enjoy an excellent market in major cities across India, including Indore, Jaipur, Bhopal, Delhi, Mumbai, Agra, Bengaluru, Nellore, and Thiruvananthapuram.

== Geographical indication ==
It was awarded the Geographical Indication (GI) status tag from the Geographical Indications Registry, under the Union Government of India, on 31 March 2023 which is valid up to 10 November 2030.

Authoor Vattara Vetrilai Viyasayigal Sangam from Authoor, proposed the GI registration of 'Authoor Vetrilai'. After filing the application in November 2020, the Betel leaf was granted the GI tag in 2023 by the Geographical Indications Registry in Chennai, making the name "Authoor Vetrilai" exclusive to the Betel leaf cultivated in the region. It thus became the first Betel leaf variety from Tamil Nadu and the 53rd type of goods from Tamil Nadu to earn the GI tag.

The prestigious GI tag, awarded by the GI registry, certifies that a product possesses distinct qualities, adheres to traditional production methods, and has earned a reputation rooted in its geographical origin.

== See also ==
- Banaras Pan
- Magahi Paan
- Tirur Betel Leaf
- Sholavandan Vetrilai
