= Athur, Thoothukudi =

Authoor
- panchayat town
- Location in Tamil Nadu, India
- Coordinates: 8.610687°N 78.082468°E
- Country: India
- State: Tamil Nadu
- District: Thoothukudi
- Elevation: 3 m (9.8 ft)

Population (2011)
  - Total: 14,470

Languages
  - Official: Tamil
- Time zone: UTC+5:30 (IST)
- PIN: 628151
- Telephone code: 04639
- Vehicle registration: TN92
- Nearest city: Thoothukudi
- Sex ratio: 1000 : 1018.58 ♂/♀
- Literacy: 79%
- Lok Sabha constituency: Thoothukudi; Formerly with Tiruchendur
- Vidhan Sabha constituency: Tiruchendur

Authoor is a panchayat town in Thoothukudi district of the Indian state of Tamil Nadu.

== Demographics ==
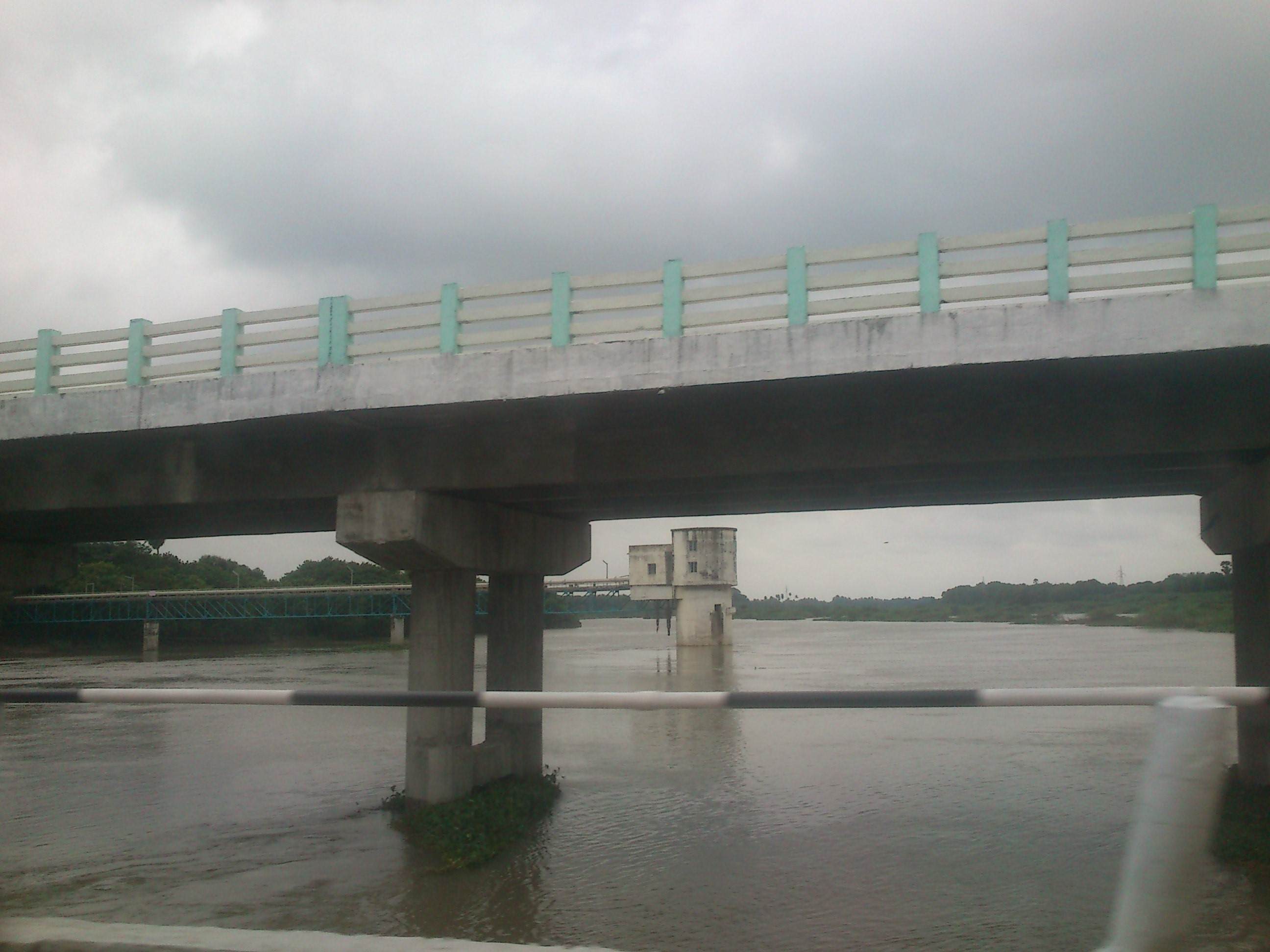

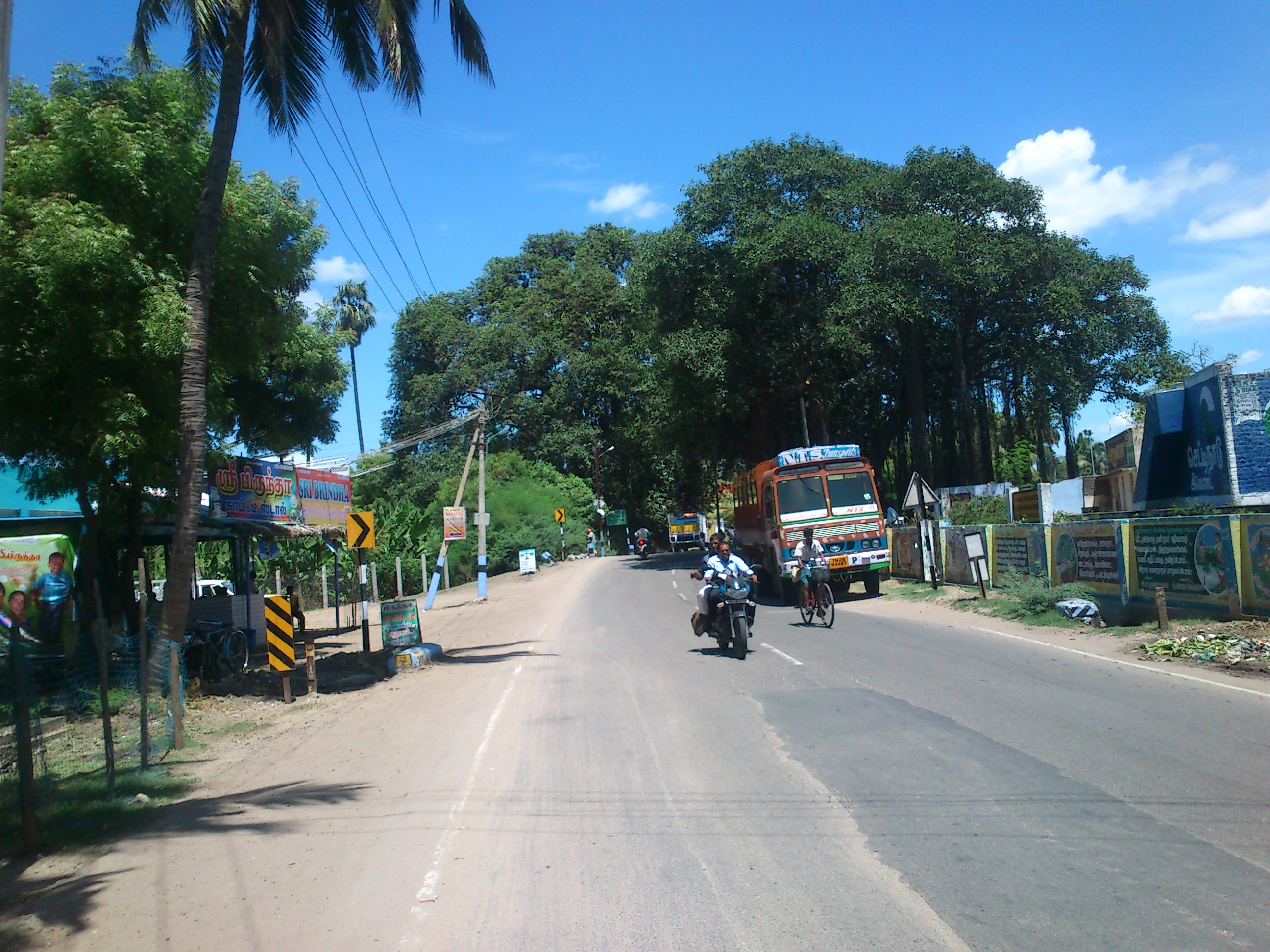

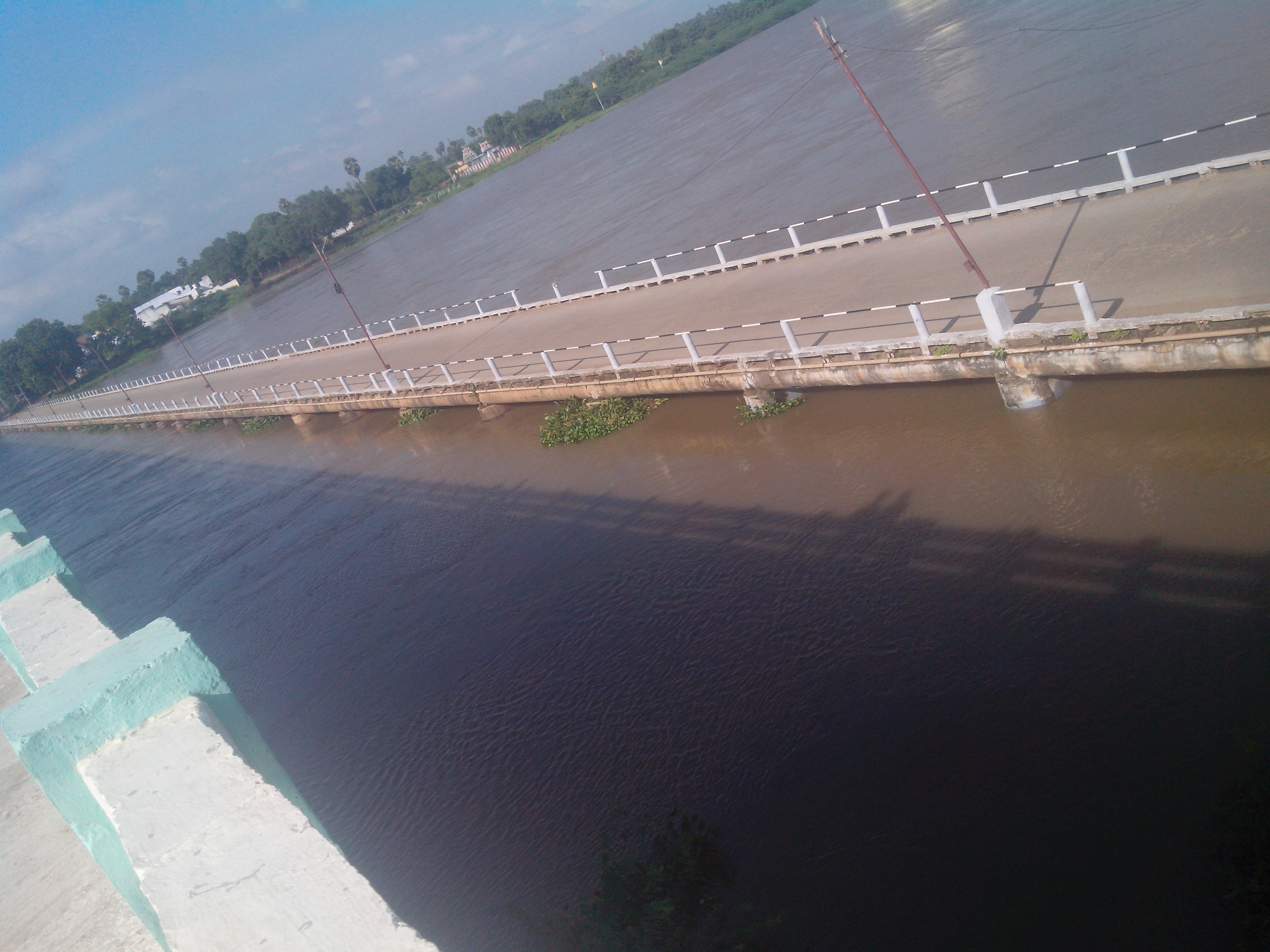

As of 2011, according to the India census, Authoor has a population of 14,470. 50% of the population is male, while 50% is female. Authoor has an average literacy rate of 79%, higher than the national average of 59.5%. Male literacy is 82% and female literacy is 76%. 12% of the population is under 6 years of age.

== Agriculture, water and natural resources ==
Many of the people of Authoor are farmers of betel leaf, banana and rice. The quality of betel leaf from Authoor is famous for its quality in Tamil Nadu. Authoor is also famous for the Thamirabarani river surrounding the town. The river provides a majority of the water used for irrigation in and around the area.

Authoor is a green town, surrounded by rice paddies and banana trees. The Thamirabarani River flows through the area, forming a big lake on one end. This makes the town a major attraction.

== Geographical indication ==
Authoor Vetrilai was awarded the Geographical Indication (GI) status tag from the Geographical Indications Registry, under the Union Government of India, on 31 March 2023 which is valid up to 10 November 2030.

Authoor Vattara Vetrilai Viyasayigal Sangam from Authoor, proposed the GI registration of 'Authoor Vetrilai'. After filing the application in November 2020, the Betel leaf was granted the GI tag in 2023 by the Geographical Indication Registry in Chennai, making the name "Authoor Vetrilai" exclusive to the Betel leaf cultivated in the region. It thus became the first Betel leaf variety from Tamil Nadu and the 53rd type of goods from Tamil Nadu to earn the GI tag.

The prestigious GI tag, awarded by the GI registry, certifies that a product possesses distinct qualities, adheres to traditional production methods, and has earned a reputation rooted in its geographical origin.

== Temples ==
- Thousand-year-old Sri Somanatha temple is situated at Authoor
- Iyyappan temple at the end of palayagramam
- Nalla pillaiyar kovil at Authoor
- Sri Mutharamman kovil, pettai street famous temple in north authoor, Sri Santhana Mari amman temple at authoor
- Mohaideen Jumma Masjit South Authoor 1. km

Nearest Temples

- Thiruchendur Murugan Temple is the second of the Arupadai Vedu at tiruchendur(18 km)
- Sri Kailashanathar temple Sernthapoomangalam (2 km)
- Sri Vaikundanatha Perumal Temple srivaikudam (23 km)
- Kulasekaranpatinam, a village 30 km away, is known for its Dasara festival. The village has the only temple where Mutharamman is shown with his consort

== Education ==
Schools

- Sri Ganesar Higher Secondary School, Panicka nadar kudieruppu(8 km)
- Al Madrasatul Abbasiya Arabic School South Authoor
- Govt Higher Secondary School Authoor
- Panchayat Union Middle School South Authoor
- Shanmuga Nadar Middle School, Authoor

Nearest schools

- Kanchi Sankara Matriculation School, West Tiruchendur (15 km)
- Kamalavathi Higher Secondary School, Sahupuram (6 km)
- Pearl Public School CBSE, Arumuganeri (9 km)
- Lk Higher Secondary School, Kayalpatnam (8 km)
- Kayalpatinam Arumuganeri Higher Secondary School (7 km)
- Central Higher Secondary School, Kayalpantnam (8 km)
- St. Antony's Higher Secondary School, Pazhaiyakayal(6 km)

Nearest Colleges

- Dr. Sivanthi Aditanar College of Engineering, Tiruchendur (18 km)
- Government Medical College, Tuticorin (23 km)
- wavoo wajeeha women's college of arts & science (Kayalpatinam)
- Dr.G.U.Pope College of Engineering, Sawyerpuram (13 km)
- Holycross Engineering College, Tannuthu (24 km)
- Chandy College of Engineering, Mullakadu (13 km)
- Aditanar College of Arts and Science, Tiruchendur (18 km)
- Govindammal Aditanar College for Women, Tiruchendur (18 km)
- Dr. Sivanthi Aditanar College of Education, Tiruchendur (18 km)
- Dr. Sivanthi Aditanar Teacher Training Institute, Tiruchendur (18 km)
- Dr. Sivanthi Aditanar College of Physical Education, Tiruchendur (18 km)
- V.O.C Arts and Science College Tuticorin (21 km)

== Transport services ==
Airway:

- Domestic Airport, Vagaikullam (22 km)

Railway:

- Arumuganeri(ANY) railway station(4km)
- Tuticorin(TN) railway station(24 km)

Seaway:

- V.O.Chidambaranar Port Trust, Tuticorin (25 km)

== See also ==
- Srivaikuntam
- Umarikadu
- Vazhavallan
- Maranthalai
