= Sholavandan Vetrilai =

Type of Betel leaf variety from Tamil Nadu, India

- Geographical indication
- Description: Betel leaf variety cultivated in Tamil Nadu, India
- Type: Betel leaf
- Area: Sholavandan block panchayath in Madurai district
- Country: India
- Registered: 31 March 2023
- Official website: ipindia.gov.in

Sholavandan Vetrilai is an important traditional crop variety of Betel leaf cultivated in the Indian state of Tamil Nadu. It is mainly cultivated in Sholavandan block panchayat of Vadipatti taluk in Madurai district.

Under its Geographical Indication tag, it is referred to as "Sholavandan Vetrilai".

== Name ==
It is named after its place of origin, the Sholavandan block panchayath. "Vetrilai" means "betel leaf" in the local state language of Tamil.

== Description ==
Sholavandan is situated on the left bank of the Vaigai River, 16 miles northwest of Madurai, in a fertile region with Sholavandan and Vadipatti blocks. The color of the betel leaves determines their pungency, with darker leaves being more pungent. An inscription at the Jeynagar Narayana Perumal temple in Sholavandan, built by Kulasekara Pandian in the 5th century AD, reveals that betel farmers were instructed to donate their income to the temple, promising a threefold return from the Pandya king of Madurai.

== Geographical indication ==
It was awarded the Geographical Indication (GI) status tag from the Geographical Indications Registry, under the Union Government of India, on 31 March 2023 which is valid up to 28 October 2031.

Tamil Nadu State Agricultural Marketing Board from Guindy and Vetri Kodikaal Vivasayigal Sangam from Nagarisalai, proposed the GI registration of 'Sholavandan Vetrilai'. After filing the application in October 2021, the Betel leaf was granted the GI tag in 2023 by the Geographical Indication Registry in Chennai, making the name "Sholavandan Vetrilai" exclusive to the Betel leaf cultivated in the region. It thus became the second Betel leaf variety from Tamil Nadu after Authoor Vetrilai and the 56th type of goods from Tamil Nadu to earn the GI tag.

The prestigious GI tag, awarded by the GI registry, certifies that a product possesses distinct qualities, adheres to traditional production methods, and has earned a reputation rooted in its geographical origin.

== See also ==
- Banaras Pan
- Magahi Paan
- Tirur Betel Leaf
- Authoor Vetrilai
