= Nangaimozhi =

Nangaimozhi is a village in the district of Tuticorin, Tamil Nadu, India. It is located 55 km from Tirunelveli, 52 km from Tuticorin and 17 km from Thiruchendur. The nearest airport is Thiruvananthapuram airport. Temples in Nangaimozhi include Ganapathi, Manthira Murthy, Parameswari Amman and Shiva.

While Nangaimozhi is said to have been a bustling village up until a hundred years ago- upto the pre-independence era, with subsequent populations now migrating to bigger cities in favour of their career, the population has now drastically reduced to be just over 1500 according to the 2011 census of India. Several communities of people like Thevar, Pillai, Nadar live in this village. The most significant feature of religious importance is the Sri Kalahastheeswarar Shiva Temple that has been around for more than over 2000 years in this small village. It is said from the temple inscriptions and local folklore that the temple was erected by the Pandian King who ruled 2000 years ago, supervised and envisioned by his two wives- Nangai and Shenba, the former of whom the village is named after. It is said that devotees to Lord Murugan on a journey to visit Tiruchendur and pilgrims used to visit this temple before proceeding to Tiruchendur. The village has an abundance of Palm Trees making the production of Karupatti(Palm Jaggery) one of the predominant means of livelihood in addition to farming. The unique feature of this village and that of its nearby surrounding areas in the Red Sand Desert, which is only present in this area of Tamilnadu.
