= Aditanar College of Arts and Science =

College in Tamil Nadu, India

- Type: Private, Government-aided
- Established: 1965; 61 years ago
- Founder: Si. Pa. Aditanar
- Affiliations: Manonmaniam Sundaranar University
- Location: Virapandianpatnam, Tiruchendur, Tamil Nadu, India; 8.5136°N 78.1189°E
- Campus: Rural, 86 acres (35 ha)
- Website: aditanarcollege.com

Aditanar College of Arts and Science is located in Veerapandianpatnam, near Tiruchendur in the Thoothukudi district of Tamil Nadu, India. It is a private, government-aided, co-educational institution of higher education. The college was founded in 1965 by S.P. Aditanar, a philanthropist and the founder of the daily newspaper 'Thina Thanthi'. It is affiliated with Manonmaniam Sundaranar University in Tirunelveli.

== History ==
This college was founded in 1965 by S. P. Aditanar with the primary objective of providing students from the rural areas surrounding Tiruchendur with easy access to higher education. Initially affiliated with Madurai Kamaraj University for the first 25 years, the college was later brought under the affiliation of Manonmaniam Sundaranar University. Operating under the administration of the Aditanar Educational Institution (AEI), the college has grown significantly over the decades; it has evolved from offering basic undergraduate courses to now providing postgraduate degree programs as well as doctoral research opportunities.

== Campus ==
Situated in Virapandianpatnam, the campus spans 86 acres and includes academic blocks, laboratories, a central library, sports facilities, and student hostels.

== Academics ==
The institution operates under the semester system prescribed by Manonmaniam Sundaranar University and offers undergraduate, postgraduate, and doctoral research programs across arts, science, and commerce streams.

=== Undergraduate programs ===
- Bachelor of Arts (English, Economics)
- Bachelor of Science (Mathematics, Physics, Chemistry, Zoology, Computer Science)
- Bachelor of Commerce (Commerce)
- Bachelor of Business Administration (Business Administration)

=== Postgraduate and research programs ===
- Master of Arts (English, Economics)
- Master of Science (Mathematics, Physics, Chemistry, Zoology)
- Doctor of Philosophy (Mathematics, Chemistry, Zoology, Economics, English)

== Rankings ==
The college was placed in the 201–300 rank band among colleges in India by the National Institutional Ranking Framework (NIRF).

== See also ==
- Tamilnadu
- Education in India
- Manonmaniam Sundaranar University
