= Marcha rice =

Type of non-Basmati aromatic rice from Bihar, India

Marcha rice (मर्चा चावल)
- Geographical indication
- Alternative names: Mircha, Marchaiya, and Maricha
- Description: Marcha rice is an aromatic rice cultivated in Bihar
- Type: Aromatic rice
- Area: West Champaran district
- Country: India
- Registered: 31 July 2023
- Official website: ipindia.gov.in

Marcha rice is a variety of non-Basmati, short-grained aromatic rice mainly grown in the Indian state of Bihar. It is a common and widely cultivated crop in Ramnagar, Gaunaha, Mainatand, Chanpatiya, Narkatiyaganj and Lauriya blocks of West Champaran district.

Under its Geographical Indication tag, it is referred to as "Marcha Rice".

== Name ==
The name "Marcha" is derived from the grain's resemblance to black pepper as in the state language of Hindi, pepper is called Marcha (मर्चा चावल). It is also locally known as Mircha, Marchaiya, and Maricha.

== Description ==
List of characteristics and facts about Marcha Rice:

This rice variety has a unique aroma in plants, grains, and flakes. It offers palatability and produces high-quality aromatic rice flakes which are soft and sweet. The husk is dark brown and the grain shape is oval, short and bold, with a 100-grain weight of 1.6-2.2g. The crop has a pale-green color, broader leaves and more vigorous growth.

=== Cultivation ===
This rice variety is suitable for clay and clay loam soil, and uses organic manures for nutrients.

=== Agro-climatic Impact ===
This rice variety develops a unique aroma due to specific agro-climatic conditions, particularly in blocks along the Budhi-Gandak (Sikarahna) River. The soil is enriched with minerals from runoff water from the Himalayan terrain enriches the soil with minerals. A microclimate with low temperatures during October-November enhances aroma development. The aroma is present in the field from the seedling to the flowering stage.

== Geographical indication ==
It was awarded the Geographical Indication (GI) status tag from the Geographical Indications Registry, under the Union Government of India, on 31 July 2023 and is valid until 28 November 2031.

Marcha Dhan Utpadak Pragatisheel Samuh from Mainatand, proposed the GI registration of Marcha rice. After filing the application in November 2021, the rice was granted the GI tag in 2023 by the Geographical Indications Registry in Chennai, making the name "Marcha rice" exclusive to the rice grown in the region.

== See also ==
- Magahi Paan
