= Dutch occupation of Tiruchendur =

- Part of Dutch–Portuguese War
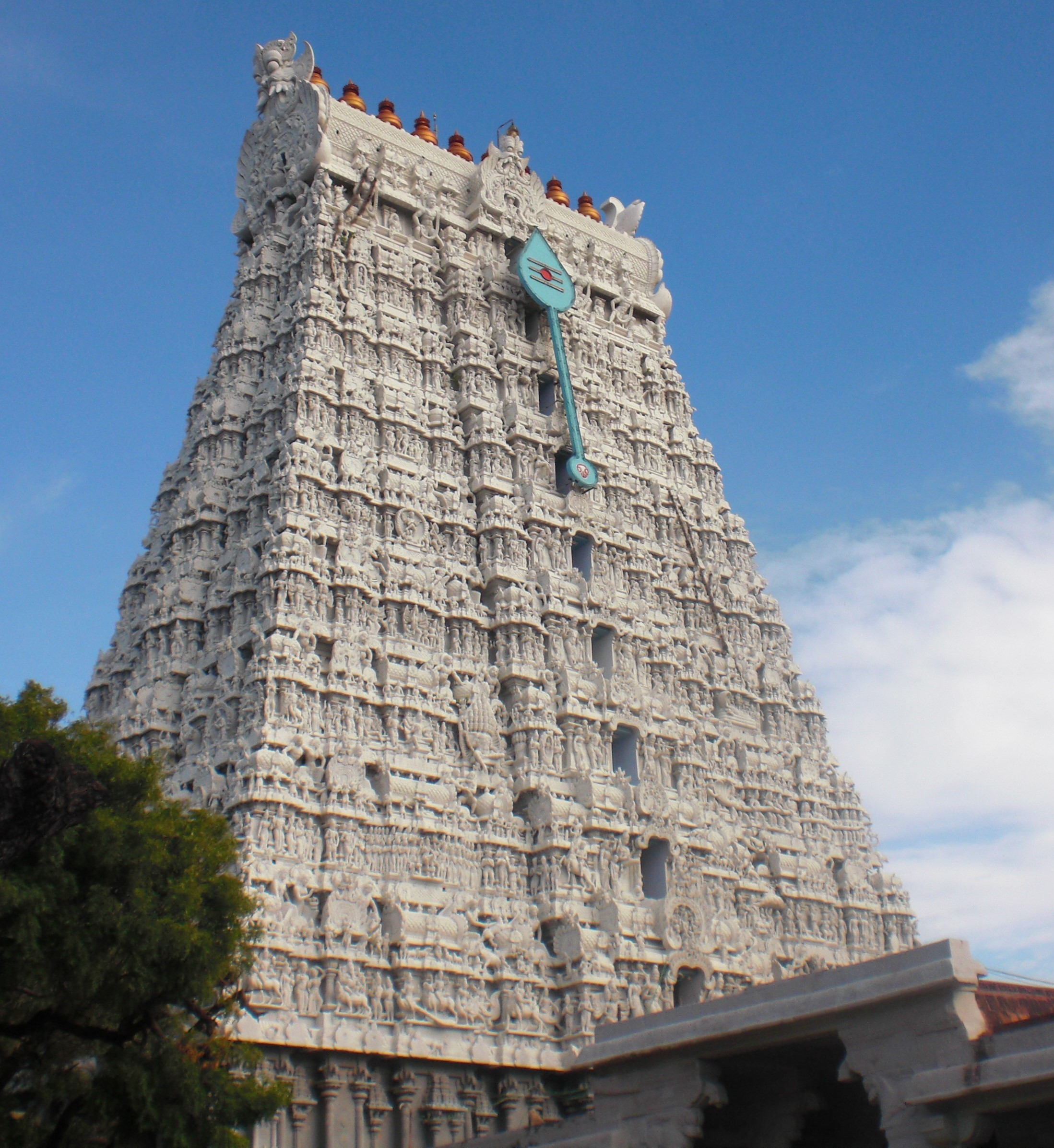
- Tiruchendur Murugan Temple
Date	1646 – 25 March 1649
Location	Tiruchendur 8.4958365°N 78.129301°E
Result	Portuguese–Nayak victory
Territorial changes	End of Dutch occupation of Tiruchendur

Belligerents
Dutch East India Company	(Kingdom of Portugal) Kingdom of Portugal; Madurai Nayak dynasty

Commanders and leaders
(Dutch East India Company) Joan Maetsuycker	Thirumalai Nayak

The Murugan temple at Tiruchendur was occupied by the Dutch East India Company between the years 1646 to 1648, during the course of their war with the Portuguese. The local people tried during these 2 years to try and free their temple, with several futile attempts. The Dutch finally vacated the temple on orders from the Naik ruler. However, while vacating the temple, they hacked away and removed the idol of the main deity of the temple, and took it back to Galle, Dutch Ceylon. While taking the idols they were not able to cross the sea due to bad behaviour of sea so they dropped them in sea and left.Later as per instructions he got in his dream, the statues are recovered by Vadamalaiappan Pillai. As a evidence even now there is an area in Palayamkottai called MuruganKurichi(meaning place where Lord Murugan gave the information) and the new idols to be kept in Tiruchendur were left in Palayamkottai Sivan temple is still there.

== Tiruchendur Temple ==
The Tiruchendur Murugan Temple (properly known as Tiruchendur Arulmigu Senthilnathar Temple) located in the Tuticorin District, India, is considered to be one of the 6 abodes of the Tamil God Murugan the son of Shiva. No record exists on the data of actual construction of the temple, but there are records of improvements to the temple by Pandya and Chera Kingdoms. However, early Cankam poetry refer to the Murugan seashore shrine at Tirrucciralaivay, which is thought to refer to the Tiruchendur Temple. The earliest existing inscription at the temple is dated 875 AD, and talks about a Pandyan called Varekuna Maran (p. 121).

== Indian Trade with Europe ==
With Vasco da Gama discovering the sea route from Europe to India, through the Cape of Good Hope, trade ties between India and Europe was established. The Portuguese were followed by other Europeans such as the Dutch, Danes, French and the English. Between the mid 16th to 18th century, trade between India and Europe increased steadily.

== Dutch East India Company ==
The Dutch established the Vereenigde Oost-Indische Compagnie (VOC) or the Dutch East India Company was formed in 1602 in order to carry out trade with India. having established their control over Java, Sumatra, and the Spice Islands, India was necessary for maintaining their hold over the East Indies. Dutch factories were established at Agra, Ahmedabad, Balasore (1658), Baranagore, Bimlipatam (1641), Bombay, Broach, Burhanpur, Chinsura (1653) (Fort Gustavus), Cochin (1663), Karikal (1645), Kasimbazar and Patna. Throughout the 17th century, the Dutch established a monopoly over the spice trade.

== Dutch–Portuguese Conflict in India ==
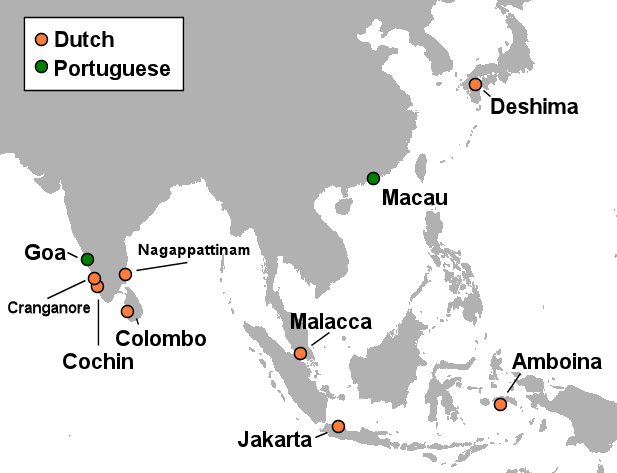
The primary Dutch and Portuguese settlements in Asia, 1665AD

== Kayalpattanam ==
A treaty was signed between the Madurai Naikaar and the Dutch, and as per the terms, the Dutch were allowed for build a fortification at Kayalpattanam. This however meant direct conflict with the Portuguese in this area. In June 1648, the Dutch settlement at Kayalpatnam was attacked by the Portuguese, and the Dutch settlers made it barely with their lives to Galle, Ceylon.

In late 1646, Dom João Garcia Sarmento, induced a certain Vithoji to travel with Dom Henrique da Cruz and some Parava chiefs, to the court of Tirumalai Naikaar at Madurai. Here, they argued that the Dutch East India Company had not made its promise of giving them annual gifts, and requested their expulsion. An offer of 9,000 Guilders (3,000 reals) to Sivanandiappa Pillai and 15,000 Guilders (5,000 reals) to Tirumalai Naikkar was made. However, the Naikaar was not convinced and did not allow the expulsion of the Dutch. However, after two years, Deva Chatira Ayya, the governor of Tirunelveli was alleged to have taken a bribe of 3,000 reals, for looking the other way when the Paravas attacked the Dutch Settlement of Kayalpatnam.

In June 1648, the company residents vacated Kayalpatnam along with their movable property, by the yacht Lilli to Galle. Soon after this the company factory was plundered and destroyed.

== Occupation of Tiruchendur Temple ==
In February 1649, the Dutch governor of Ceylon, Joan Maetsuycker, led a force of 436 Europeans in an assault on the Portuguese. In the course of this conflict, the Dutch occupied the Portuguese possessions at Tiruchendur, Tuticorin and also the Murugan Temple. They fortified the temple, and used it as a garrison. The Gold and silver of the temple was freely looted by the soldiers. The local people made several futile attempts to gain control of the temple, and finally made a formal complaint to Thirumalai Nayak. Nayak mediated between the Dutch and the locals, advising the Dutch to vacate the temple, and also leave by the sea route, to prevent any further attacks on them.

The Tiruchendur Temple was captured on 1 March 1649, and was used a base to launch attacks on the Portuguese interests of Tuticorin. The events are described by Dutch soldier Johann von der Behr of Leipzig (1620–1680) and Johan de Vogel (d.1674) who a junior merchant and secretary (p. 336).

While vacating the temple, the Dutch are said to have tried to destroy the structure by setting fire and bombardment. However their efforts were futile with the mandapams withstanding their battery attack. This is described by the French writer M Rennel, in his book A Description, Historical and Geographical, of India (1785), where the author claims he has heard the story from a former Dutch soldier who took part in the events.

== Local legends ==
According to local tradition, while vacating the Tiruchendur temple, the Dutch decided to carry away the idol of the main deity of Shanmukhar and Śiva Natarajar, as they thought they were made of gold. Initial attempts to melt the idols for the metal proved futile, and they carried away the idols by sea. However, once at sea, there was a wild storm and the vessel shook violently. Frightened that the idols had caused the bad weather, the Dutch sailors threw away the idol at sea. Meanwhile, the loss of the idol was reported by the locals to Vadamalaiyappa Pillai, the local governor of Tirunelveli for the Madurai Naikaar. Following which, Pillai ordered for a new idol to be made, and this was made and transported to Tiruchendur.

Vadamalaiappa Pillaiyyan is said to have recovered the original idol from the sea, either by negotiating with the Dutch, (who had fled to Ceylon), or miraculously recovering it from the sea. According to local tradition, a dream revealed that the location where the idol was immersed would be shown by a floating lime, and a kite would be circling the skies. The place was supposed to have been found, and the idols recovered by divers. The original idols were installed back at the temple, and the replacement idol was installed at Tiruppirantîsvarar Temple (Venku Patcha Kovil) at Palamcottah[.

== Idol Recovery ==
However, according to Dutch records, the idol was carried away to Dutch Ceylon. Repeated attempts were made by the Naikaar to restore the idol back to the Tiruchendur Temple. The Dutch held the idols for ransom, at one point demanding 100,000 reals for its release.

On 22 February 1649, Mudaliyar, Pillai, Maraikkayar, negotiated on behalf of the Madurai Naikkar to have the Tiruchendur temple vacated, for which Governor Maetsuycker demanded a ransom of 100,000 reals. Since the Naikaar was at that time involved in a conflict with the Bijapur Sultanate in the North, he was unable to send troops to Tirunchendur to dislodge the Dutch. Starting from 8 March 1649, skirmishes took place daily between the Dutch (led by Von der Behr) and the local villagers who tried to take back the temple. On 25 March 1649, the Dutch company forces vacated the temple and fled to Ceylon, fearing that the Naikaar would attack with a larger force. However, they hacked and took away some stone images as ransom, and among the idols was that of Murugan (Subrahmanya). A ransom of 100,000 reals was demanded from the local priests or the Naikaar. It was rumored that the idol was worth its weight in gold, as it was deeply revered by the locals.

In January 1650, a delegation of both Hindu and Muslims was sent by the chiefs of Kayalpatnam to Van der Meijden of Dutch Ceylon, asking for the idol to be restituted. In early 1650, Ravi Varma VI, the Raja of Travancore secretly negotiated for the idol to be sold to him. (The Raja had visited Tiruchendur in 1620, on his way to a pilgrimage to Rameshwaram). In April 1650, a vessel from Killakkarai was sent to Negombo, carrying the representatives of Vadamalaiyappa Pillai the pradhani of the Madurai Naikaar, Narayana Mudaliyar the governor of Kayalpatam, Andagala the vice-governor of Kayalpatam, and the Brahmin heads of the Tiruchendur temple. Still Governor Jacob van Kittensteyn resisted and stuck to his demand of ransom of 100,000 reals. By mid 1650, the Dutch had reduced the ransom, but still found it difficult to buyers for the idol. In September 1650, another group landed with a letter from Tirumalai Naikaar. However, its authenticity was doubted by Van Kittensteijn.

In February 1651, the idols were sent to Kayalpatnam, aboard the fluyt Post and the galiot Hazewind, along with merchant Van der Meijden, offering to sell the idols for 25,000 to 30,000 reals. Finding no buyers, the idols were hurrdidely returned to Galle by Van der Meijden, due to alleged provocation from the Portuguese.

The records of the Dutch East India Company are silent of what really happened to the idols after this. However, an inscription of the madapam of the temple dating to 1653, describe the event when the recovered idol of Tiruchendur was installed in the presence of Thirumala Naikaar and Vadamalaiyappa Pillai the governor of Tirunelveli. Venrimalai Kavirayar (1624–1682), a priest of the Tiruchendur temple also composed a psalm in Tamil to mark the occasion. (p. 335–347)
