= Kailasanathar Temple, Srivaikuntam =

Kailasanathar Temple
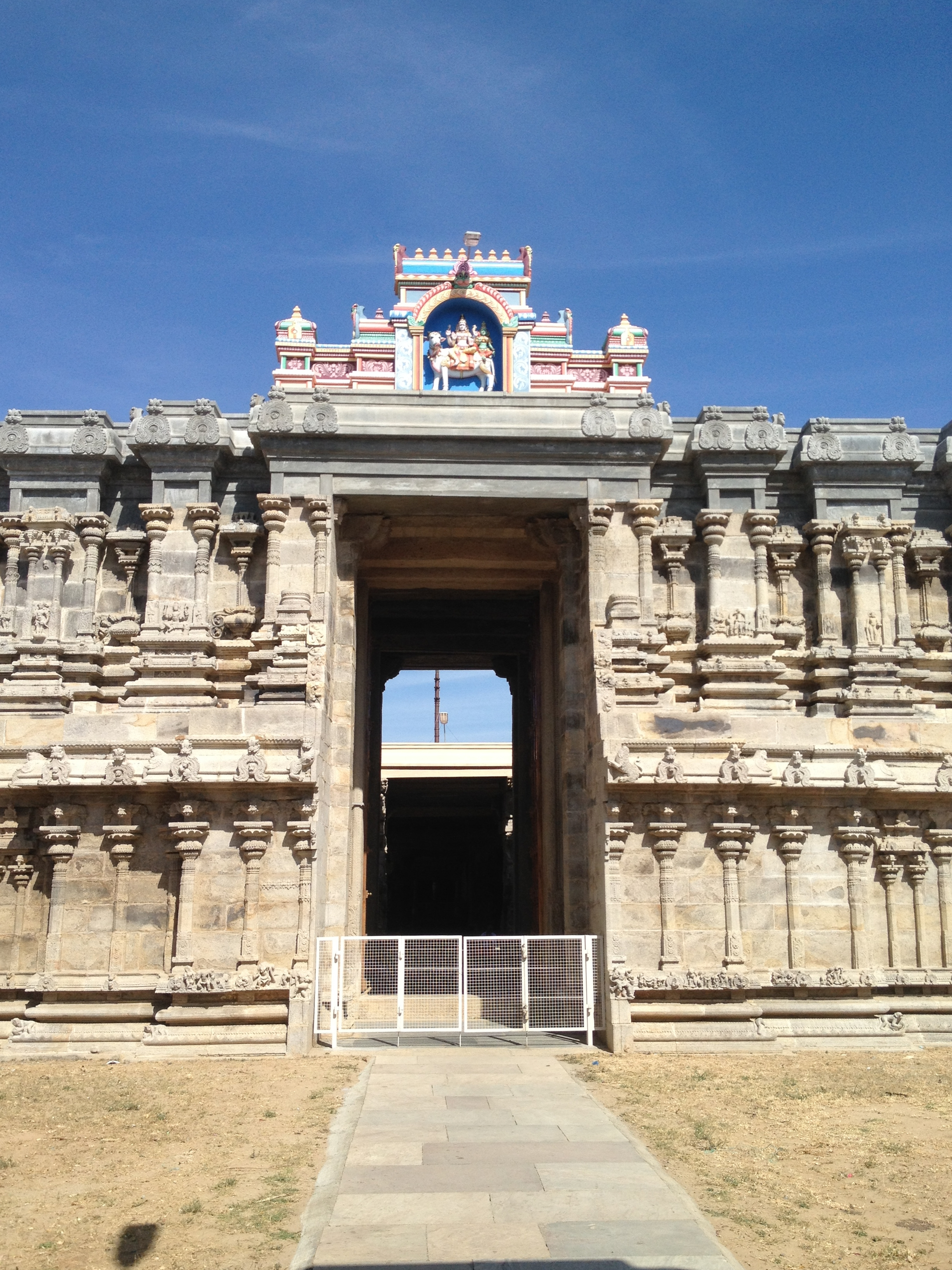

- Location in Tamil Nadu

Religion
- Affiliation: Hinduism
- District: Thoothukudi
- Deity: Kailasanathar(Shiva) Sivakami (Parvati)

Location
- Location: Srivaikuntam
- State: Tamil Nadu
- Country: India
- Interactive map of Kailasanathar Temple
- Coordinates: 8°38′09″N 77°54′54″E

Architecture
- Type: Dravidian architecture

Kailasanathar Temple in Srivaikuntam, a village in Thoothukudi district in the South Indian state of Tamil Nadu, is dedicated to the Hindu god Shiva. It is located 30 km from Tirunelveli. Constructed in the Dravidian style of architecture, the temple has three precincts. Shiva is worshipped as Kailasanathar and his consort Parvati as Sivakami. The temple is the sixth temple in the series of Nava Kailasams where the presiding deity of all the nine temples is Kailasanathar and associated with a planetary deity. The temple is associated with the planet Saturn.

A granite wall surrounds the temple, enclosing all its shrines. The temple has a flat gateway tower, unlike other South Indian temples that have a pyramidal entrance tower. The temple was originally built by Chandrakula Pandya Vijayanagar and Nayak kings commissioned pillared halls and major shrines of the temple during the 16th century. The temple has artistic sculptures representative of Nayak art.

The temple is open from 6 am - 12 pm and 4-7 pm on all days except during festival days when it is open all day. Four daily rituals and three yearly festivals are held at the temple, of which the Brahmotsavam festival during the Tamil months of Chittirai (April - May) and Aippasi (October - November) being the most prominent. The temple is maintained and administered by the Hindu Religious and Endowment Board of the Government of Tamil Nadu.

== Legend and religious significance ==
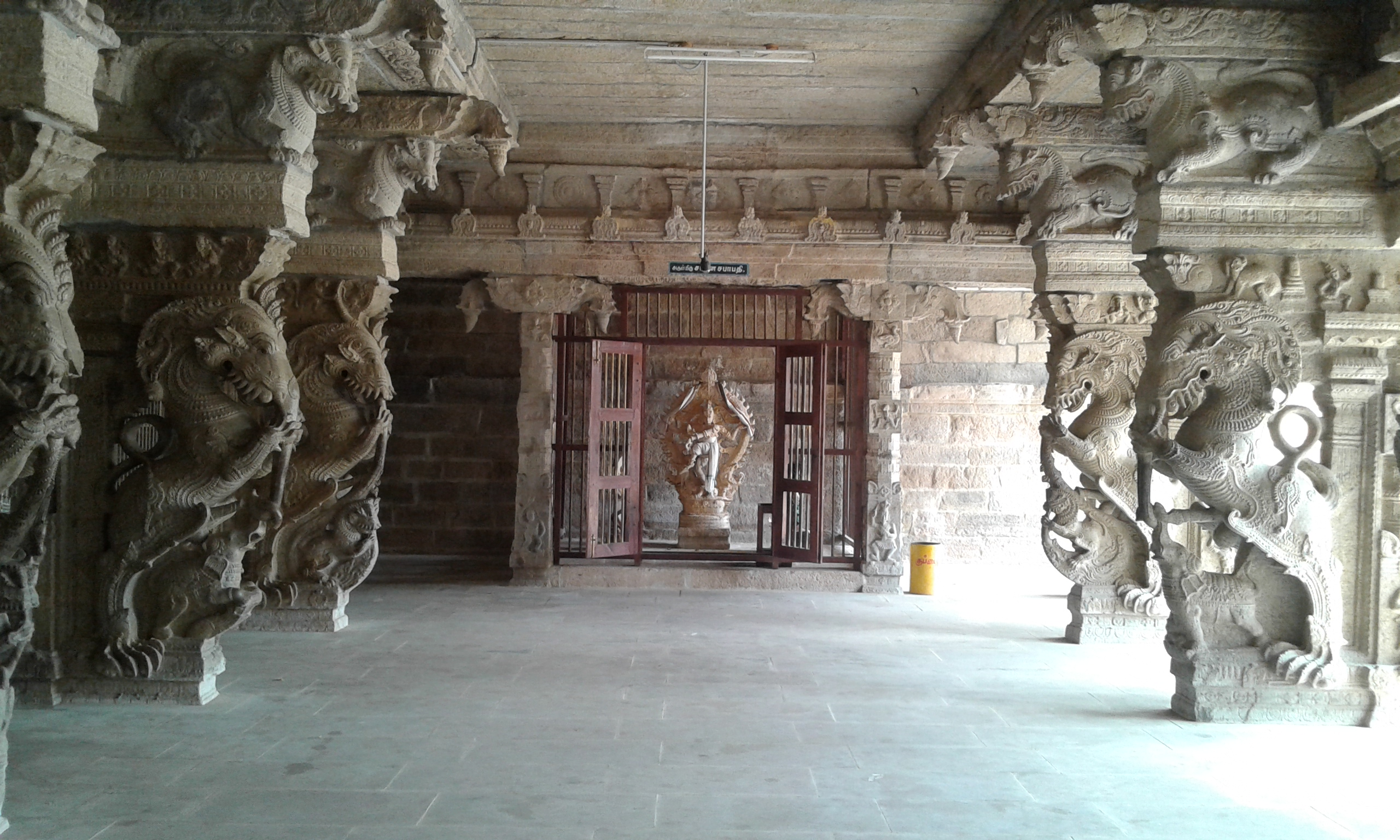
The Santhana sababathy hall where image of Nataraja is housed

As per legend, sage Urosamar floated a set of flowers in Tamiraparani River and the sixth flower reached the shore at this place. The sage established a temple for Kailasanathar. The lingam, the aniconic form of Shiva in the temple, is believed to an aspect of Shani, one of the planetary deities. The flagstaff of the temple is believed to have been brought from Devi Kanya Kumari in Kanniyakumari. The Nataraja in this temple is called Santhana Sababathi (anointed with sandal). Nine temples, including this one, on the banks of Tamiraparani river are classified as Nava Kailasam; the presiding deity of each is Kailasanathar and each temple is associated with one of the nine planetary deities (Navagraha). The temple is associated with the planet Shani (Saturn) and considered sixth in the nine temples. Kumaraguruparar, a saint of the 18th century, was born at this place.

== Architecture ==
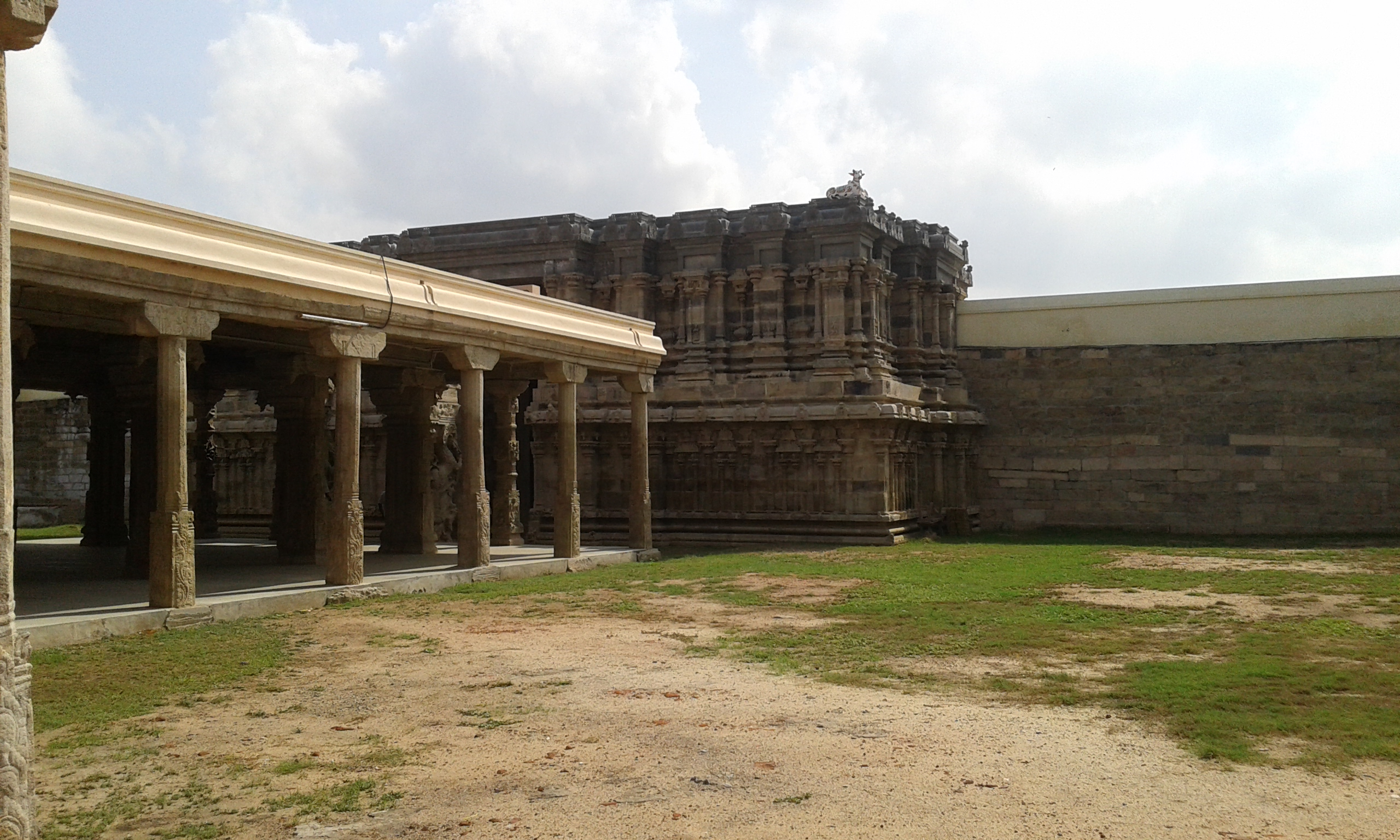
The precinct around the entrance

The image of Kailasanathar (Shiva) in the form of Lingam is housed in the sanctum. The shrine of his consort Sivakami (Parvati) is housed in a west-facing shrine. The temple also houses the images of Vinayaka, Subramanya, Veerabhadra, Rishabhandika, and Nataraja on the walls. Two sculptures - Veerabadra and a warrior in the flagstaff hall - are noteworthy. The west-facing shrine adjacent to the flagstaff has a hall with yali pillars, where Nataraja is housed. The temple has sculptural representation of sage Romasa, Agnipathar and Veerabadrar on the pillars in the temple dating back to the Nayak Empire. The shrine of the guardian deity Bhoothanathar, housing his wooden image, is an important shrine in the temple. He is given the primary role during the Chittirai Brahmotsavam festival. It is believed that during historic times, the temple staff used to surrender the keys of the temple to its protector Bhoothanathar. The image of the Nataraja is always covered with Sandal paste and hence called Rathnasabapathy.

== History ==
The temple is believed to be originally built by the Pandya king, Chandrakula Pandya, who ruled over the region of Madurai. He built the central shrine and vimana of the temple. Veerappa Nayaka (1609-23 AD), a ruler of Madurai Nayak dynasty built the Yagasala, dwajasthamba (flagstaff) and Sandana Sababathy hall. In modern times, the temple is maintained and administered by the Hindu Religious and Endowment Board of the Government of Tamil Nadu. The temple is the place where Kumaragurupara Desikar, a saint from the 17th century.

== Festival ==
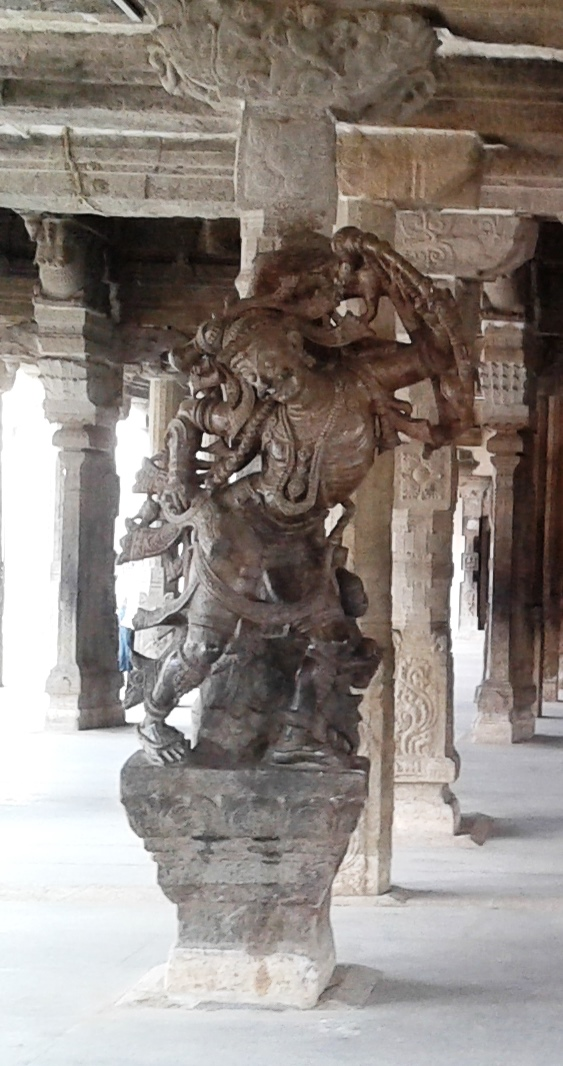
Warrior

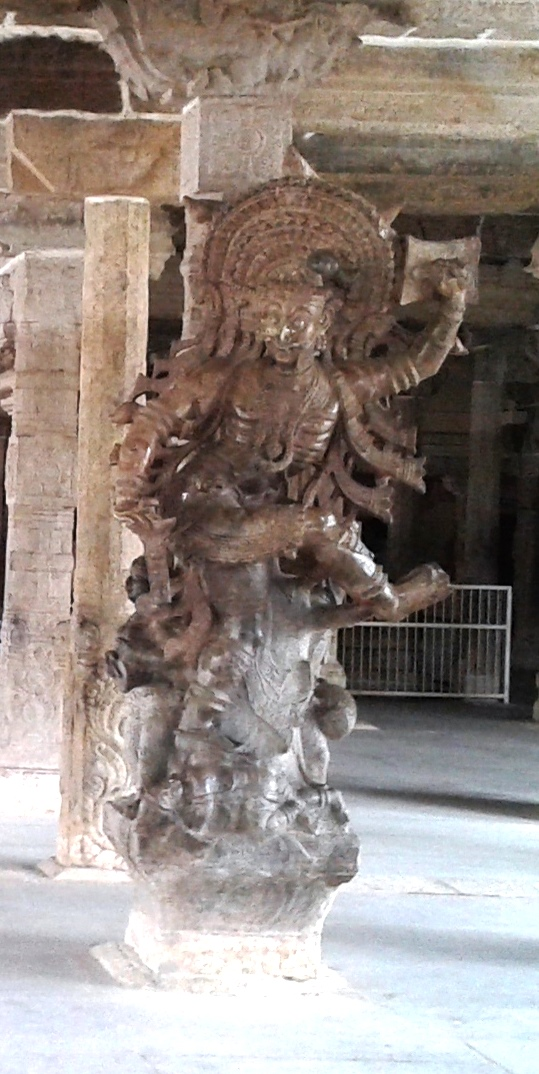
Virabhadra

The temple follows Shaivite tradition. As at other Shiva temples of Tamil Nadu, Shaivite Brahmin temple priests, perform the temple rituals. The rituals are performed four times a day: Kalasanthi at 8:30 a.m., Uchikalam at 11:30 p.m., Sayarakshai at 6:00 p.m., and Aravanai Pooja between 8:00 - 8:00 p.m. Each ritual has three steps: alangaram (decoration), naivethanam (food offering) and deepa aradanai (waving of lamps) for both Kailasanathar and Sivakami. During the last step of worship, nagaswaram (pipe instrument) and tavil (percussion instrument) are played, religious instructions in the Vedas (sacred text) are recited by priests, and worshippers prostrate themselves in front of the temple mast. There are weekly, monthly and fortnightly rituals performed in the temple. The temple is open from 6 am - 12 pm and 4-8:30 pm generally except during new moon days when it is open all day.

The Brahmotsavam festival celebrated during the Tamil months of Chittirai (April - May) and Aippasi (October - November) are the most prominent festivals of the temple. Other festivals like Sivarathri, Arattu festival, Thirukalyanam (sacred marriage) and Kanthasasthi are the other festivals celebrated. The Thirukalyanam festival is attended by thousands of devotees in the region.
