= Kodaganallur =

Coordinates: 8°42′N 77°35′E

- Interactive map of Kodaganallur

Kodaganallur is a village on the banks of the river Tamaraparani in Tamil Nadu, located near the Laccadive sea in the south of India. It is located 15 kilometres from Tirunelveli on the Tirunelveli-Cheranmadevi state highway.

== Temples ==
The village of Kodaganallur houses ancient temples dating back to the 12th century - a Vishnu temple for Sri Brahanmmadhava Swamy and a Shiva temple for Sri Abhimukt Ewara and Sri Kailasanatha - one of the Nava Kailasas.

- Sri Abhimuktheswarar: This temple was located towards west. God Name - Abhimuktheswarar. Ambal - Soundaravalli
- Shivalingam made by a stone called panalingam, which was brought by great saint Gangadhara swamigal from kasi. We can found Gangadhara swamigal jeeva samadhi nearby temple and river.
- Five Vinayagar, Five Panalingam and three guru are at same one Sivan temple.
- Three Guru at one Temple -
- Saint Shri Maha Dev Swamigal... (Jeeva Samadhi) near the river facing west, Sri Sankara statue next to the big pillar facing east.
- Nangaiyar Amman temple. This is the first temple as we enter the village..there is Vinayagar, veera badrar, bairavar, saptakannimar and nangaiyar Amman shrines.
- Sri Daskshinamoorthi at temple facing towards south.
- Adisankarar Mutt
- Sri Adisankarar mutt was nearby Avimuktheeswarar temple.

== See also ==
- Nava Kailasam
