= Nava Kailasam =

Group of Shiva temples

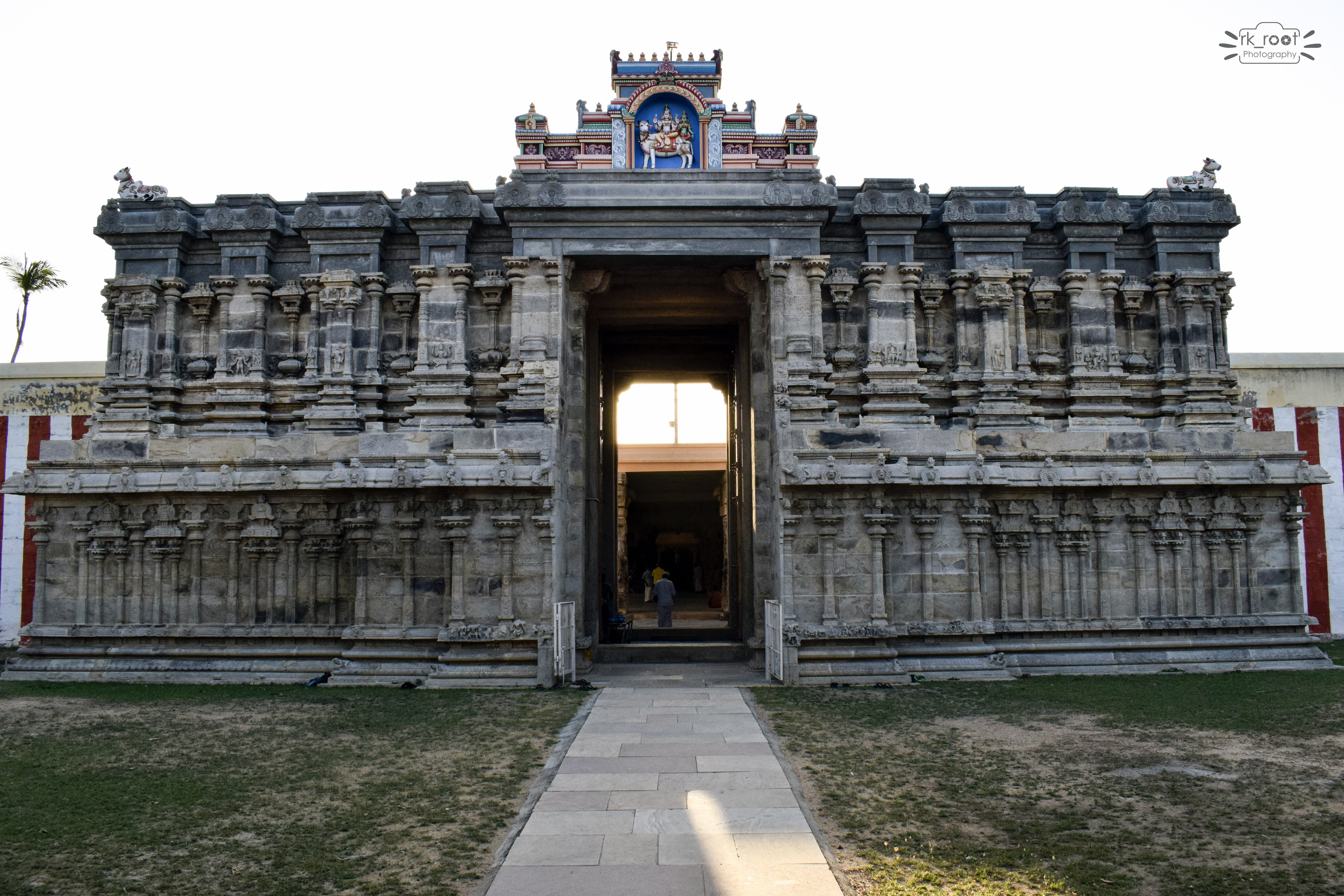
Arulmigu Kailasa Nathar Temple, Thiruvaikundam

Nava Kailasam refers to nine individual ancient temples of Lord Shiva in southern districts of Tamil Nadu. These temples are located in the districts Tirunelveli and Tuticorin.

== Legend ==
All these nine temples are linked with Sage agasthiyar.

== Temples ==
Sage Agasthiyar was performing penance in the Podhikai Hills. One of his prime disciples was Uromacha Munivar. He prayed to Lord Pashupathi to attain liberation. The Lord desired to bestow this blessing upon him through his guru, Agasthiyar. Agasthiyar placed nine flowers in the river and instructed Uromacha Munivar to install a Shiva Lingam as Kailasha Nathar wherever the flowers settled on the riverbank. Finally, Munivar was to bathe and worship the Lord at the spot where the river meets the ocean. By following these instructions, he would attain his desired outcome. Remaining faithful to his guru's words, Munivar worshipped the Lord, with the nine flowers transforming into Shiva Lingams at the nine locations where they came to rest. Ultimately, he bathed at the point where Thamirabarani merged with the ocean and achieved liberation. These nine divine abodes are known as Nava Kayilayam.

These nine Siva temples are located uniquely on the river bed of Thamirabarani river. They are:

S.No	Location	Temple	Planet
1	Papanasam, Tirunelveli Dist	Arulmigu Papanasa Nathar Temple	Suriyan
2	Cheran Mahadevi	Arulmigu Kailasa Nathar Temple	Chandran
3	Kodaganallur	Arulmigu Kailasa Nathar Temple	Chevvai
4	Kunnathur	Arulmigu Kotha Parameswarar Temple	Raghu
5	Murappanadu	Arulmigu Kailasa Nathar Temple	Guru
6	Thiruvaikundam	Arulmigu Kailasa Nathar Temple	Sani
7	Thenthirupperai	Arulmigu Kailasa Nathar Temple	Buthan
8	Raajapathy	Arulmigu Kailasa Nathar Temple	Kethu
9	Saendha Poomangalam, Tuticorin	Arulmigu Kailasa Nathar Temple	Sukran

== See also ==
- Nava Tirupathi
- Pancha Bhuta Sthalam
