= Virapandianpatnam =

Virapandianpatnam Virayampathy
- village
- Location in Tamil Nadu, India Virapandianpatnam (India)
- Coordinates: 8°31′12″N 78°7′5″E
- Country: India
- State: Tamil Nadu
- District: Thoothukudi District

Government
  - Body: Virapandianpattnam Panchayath

Languages
  - Official: Tamil
- Time zone: UTC+5:30 (IST)
- PIN: 628216
- Telephone code: 04639
- Vehicle registration: TN 92
- Nearest city: Thoothukudi
- Lok Sabha constituency: Thoothukudi
- Vidhan Sabha constituency: Tiruchendur
- Civic agency: Virapandianpattnam Panchayath

Virapandianpattanam or Virapandianpatnam is a village on the southeastern coast of the Indian peninsula, near Thiruchendur, Thoothukudi District, Tamil Nadu. Many people were converted to Roman Catholicism there by St. Francis Xavier by 1544.

== Village Center ==
The village's focal point is a Roman Catholic church built in 1886. Surrounding it is the village cemetery, a grotto for Mother Mary, the Priest's quarters, a high school and a nursery. Chapels for various saints are located around the village. The church has daily masses at 5:15 am and 6:30 am. Most masses are broadcast over the church's speakers, and most village residents can hear it from their homes. The church was recently renovated with new paint and pews. The literacy rate is 98%. It is one of the oldest churches in South India.

== Economy ==
Although many of the villagers are involved in various other businesses and occupations, fishing and fish-related businesses are the village's main sources of income.

== Infrastructure ==
The nearest airport is Thoothukudi Vagaikulam Airport, about a one-hour drive from Virapandianpattanam. Most major cities in Tamil Nadu can be accessed via bus. The easiest way to access Patnam is to take the train from Chennai to Thoothukudi, then take either a taxi or bus. Another other easy way is to take a bus from Chennai. Many luxurious private buses from Chennai can take one to Patnam in relative comfort in about 9 hours.

== Educational institutions ==
=== Colleges ===
1. Aditanar College of Arts & Science

=== Schools ===
1. St. Thomas Higher Secondary School.
2. St. Thomas Anglo Indian Metriculation School.
3. St. Joseph's Convent School.
4. St. Mary's Primary School

=== Technical Institutes ===
1. ITI - Industrial Training Institute.
