= Vittilapuram =

- village
- Location in Tamil Nadu, India Vittilapuram (India)
- Coordinates: 8°41′0″N 77°49′45″E
- Country: India
- State: Tamil Nadu
- District: Thoothukudi

Population (2001)41% of the population is male
  - Total: 16,214

Languages
  - Official: Tamil
- Time zone: UTC+5:30 (IST)
- Vehicle registration: TN-
- Coastline: 0 kilometres (0 mi)

Vittilapuram is a village in Thoothukudi district, Tamil Nadu, India. It is located on the bank of the Tamirabarani river. It is around 15 kilometers from Tirunelveli junction and 2 kilometers from Vasayappapuram Vilaku on the Tirunelveli-Thoothukudi highway, NH 7A. The place name comes from the Sri Panduranga Vittalar temple. It was built by King Vittalarayar under the jurisdiction of Empire Sri Krishnadeva Rayar in 1547 AD.

== Temples ==
Vittilapuram hosts many temples including Sri Panduranga Vittalar, Virbakasheswar, Vandimalachi Ammam Kovil, Bala Vinayagar, and Tiruvaikuntapathi Swami. The Tiruvaikuntapathi Swami is dedicated to Vishnu. A sacred canal bridge was built in the nineteenth century. It was later replaced.

=== Sri Panduranga Vittalar temple ===
Panduranga temple was adorned with Kumbabishekam on 2 July 2009. This was a special occasion as it was celebrated almost after 106 years with the full support of Sringeri Saradha Peetam. This temple has a rich collection of stone carvings. Each Tamil calendar Thai month (January English calendar), Laksharchanai is celebrated. The temple was visited by Great Saints of Maharashtra including Namadev Maharaj, Tukaram Maharaj and Haridas Giri. Two Bhagavatha Mela were organized by Sri Namananda Giri and Sri Tukaram Ganapathy Maharaj, respectively.

== Transport ==
Bus transport is available from Tirunveli.
