= Alwarthirunagiri block =

Establishment in Tamil Nadu, India

Alwarthirungari block is a revenue block in the Thoothukudi district of Tamil Nadu, India. It has a total of 30 panchayat villages.
