= Umarikadu =

- town
- Location in Tamil Nadu, India Umarikadu (India)
- Coordinates: 8.6261°N 78.0601°E
- Country: India
- State: Tamil Nadu
- District: Thoothukudi
- Elevation: 13 m (43 ft)

Languages
  - Official: Tamil
- Time zone: UTC+5:30 (IST)
- PIN: 628151
- Vehicle registration: TN69

Umarikadu is a village located in the Srivaikundam Taluk Thoothukudi district in the state of Tamil Nadu, India. Kurumbur railway station is the nearest, while Arumuganeri railway station, Nazareth railway station, Alwar Tirunagri railway station and Tiruchendur railway station are in the vicinity.

== Schools ==
- Government Higher Secondary School In Umarikadu there are primary and higher secondary schools up to 12th grade. Students from Korkai, Authoor, Valavallan and other villages nearby attend these schools. The people of Umarikadu support the schools through monetary and land grants both from the village fund and from private gifts.

== Banks ==
- A Cooperative Bank provides financial services essential to the farmers in the village.
