= Kurumbur =

Coordinates: 12°36′N 79°37′E

- village
- Interactive map of Kurumbur
- India: India
- State: Tamil Nadu
- Tuticorin: Tuticorin

Government
  - Type: Panchayat

Population (2001)
  - Total: 3,907

Languages
  - Official: Tamil
- Time zone: UTC+5:30 (IST)
- PIN -->: 628207

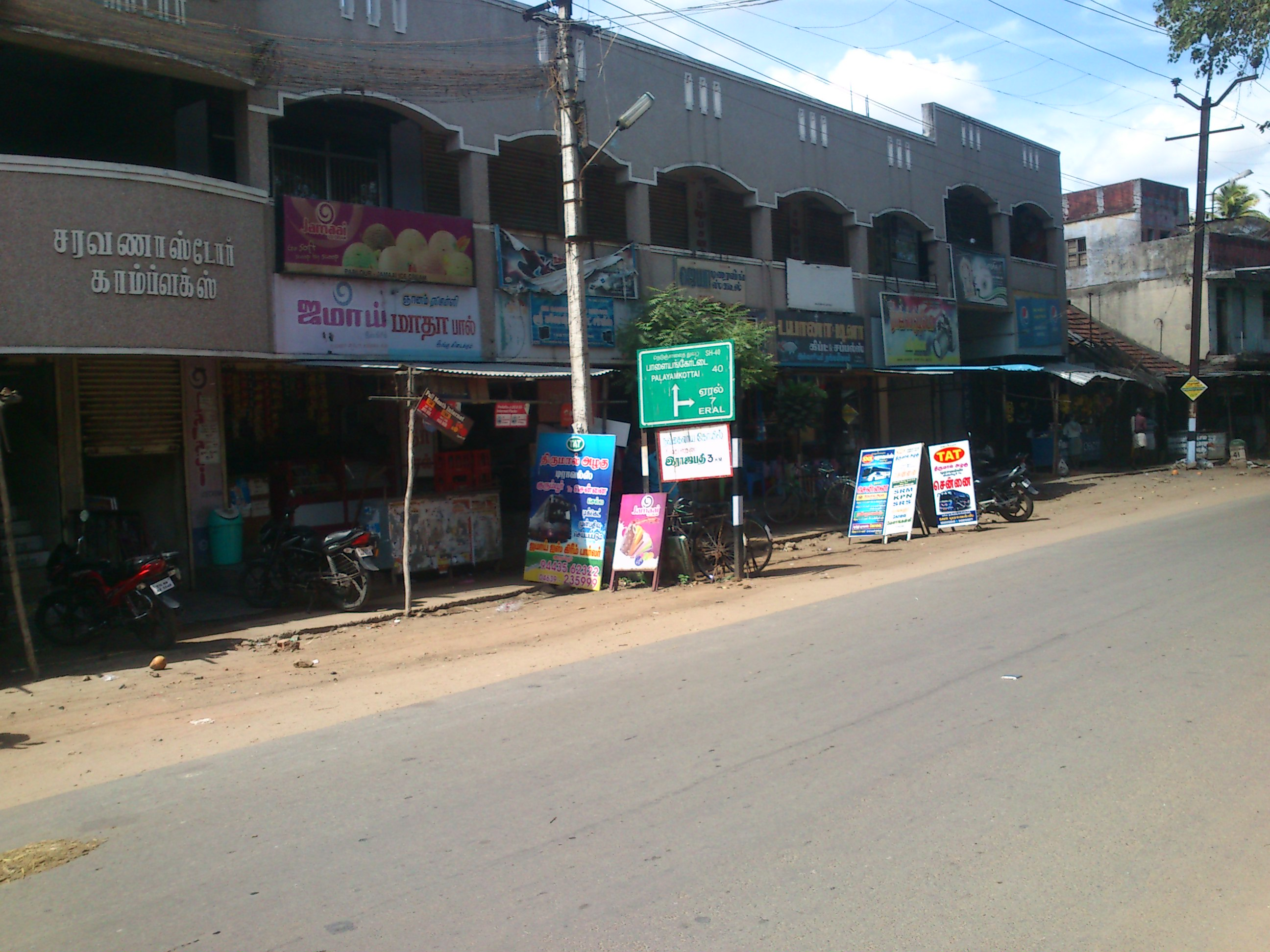
Kurumbur bazar

Kurumbur is a village in the Thoothukudi district, Tamil Nadu, India. Kurumbur is a village located in Angamagalam Panchayat.

== Facilities ==
Kurumbur has a High school (St Lucia's) and a Government Middle school.

Kurumbur has lots of Grocery shops, Fresh Vegetable shops, a Sunday Market, a Fish Market, a Poultry and Butcher shop (selling fresh meat such as mutton, chicken and beef etc.), Medical shops, an Electrical shop, a Building materials shop, Sweet stalls, Bakery shops, Restaurants, a Music shop, and a stationery shop etc.

Kurumbur bhai Kadar Porotta curry, Kurumbur Mascat Halwa, Kurumbur butter biscuits are very famous in this village.

Kurumbur has a library called Tandhai Periyar Noolagam.

Near to Kurumbur are two Higher Secondary Schools called Kamaraj Higher Secondary school and PNK Higher Secondary school.

== History ==
Between 1324 and 1328 Friar Jordan who came to Travancore, visited all the places where St. Thomas the Apostle had formed Christian communities, including the South Pandian Kingdom. One evidence to prove his preaching Christianity in the Pandian kingdom is the building of a church in Kurumbur Azhagappapuram in honour of St. Vincent Ferrer (Visenthiyppar), a Dominican. In that church we can find a statue of St. Vincent Ferrer placed by Friar Jordan. At that time the Christians of Kanakkan Kudieruppu had migrated to the fertile land north of Maanaveeranaadu and south of Thamirabarani River. That is why Friar Jordan had to build the church of St. Vincent Ferrer in Kurumbur.

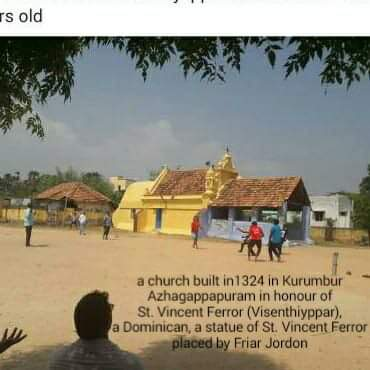
St. Vincent Ferrer Church

== Demographics ==
As per the 2001 census, Kurumbur had a total population of 3907, with 1897 males and 2010 females. Out of the total population, only 2237 people were literate.
