= Maranthalai =

- town
- Location in Tamil Nadu, India Maranthalai (India)
- Coordinates: 8.621°N 78.06°E
- Country: India
- State: Tamil Nadu
- District: Thoothukudi
- Elevation: 13 m (43 ft)

Languages
  - Official: Tamil
- Time zone: UTC+5:30 (IST)
- Vehicle registration: TN69

Maranthalai is a village in Thoothukudi district in the state of Tamil Nadu, India. Authoor is the nearby panchayat town. Thamirabarani River rover flows through Maranthalai, thus serving the village with water.

== School ==
- TDTA Isaac Duraisamy Nadar High School
- Little Angel School: Closure order issued by Directorate of Elementary Education, Tamil Nadu in 2015
