= Tirur Betel Leaf =

Type of Betel leaf variety from Kerala, India

- Geographical indication
- Description: Betel leaf variety cultivated in Kerala, India
- Type: Betel leaf
- Area: Tirur, Tanur, Tirurangadi, Kuttippuram, Malappuram and Vengara block panchayaths of Malappuram district
- Country: India
- Registered: 14 August 2019
- Official website: ipindia.gov.in

Tirur Betel Leaf is an important traditional crop variety of Betel leaf cultivated in the Indian state of Kerala. It is mainly cultivated in Tirur, Tanur, Tirurangadi, Kuttippuram, Malappuram and Vengara block panchayaths of Malappuram district of Kerala.

Under its Geographical Indication tag, it is referred to as "Tirur Betel Leaf (Tirur Vettila)".

== Description ==
Tirur is a major trading center for fish and betel leaves. The area is renowned for its high-quality betel leaves, which are in great demand both domestically and internationally. Tirur betel leaves are distinct due to their pungent flavor, thicker leaves, and higher antioxidant capacity. These characteristics make them ideal for various uses, including the preparation of Ayurvedic medicines, ceremonial occasions, and pan masala.

The two most common cultivars of betel leaves in Tirur are Puthukodi and Nadan. Puthukodi is mainly grown as a pure crop, while Nadan is grown as an intercrop in coconut and arecanut gardens. Puthukodi has maximum leaf weight per unit area and optimum leaf parameters, making it more acceptable and valuable in the market. Nadan is mainly sold in local markets in Thrissur, Kozhikode, and Malappuram districts, whereas Puthukodi is exported to countries like Pakistan, Afghanistan, and Bangladesh, generating substantial revenue for local farmers and traders.

Many people in Malappuram district derive their livelihood directly or indirectly, partly or fully from the production, processing, handling, transportation, and marketing of betel leaves. The cultivation and trade of betel leaves have a significant impact on the local economy, providing employment opportunities and income for numerous families.

The leaves are also culturally significant, playing a vital role in traditional ceremonies and rituals. Betel vine is used in temples for ‘poojas’ and to give ‘Dakshina’ during auspicious occasions. It is an integral part of Thamboolam and it is believed that the juice of betel leaf in Thamboolam, chewed after food enhances digestion.

Tirur is also a significant supplier of betel leaves to the Kottakkal Arya Vaidya Sala, a well-known institution for Ayurvedic medicine.

== Geographical indication ==
It was awarded the Geographical Indication (GI) status tag from the Geographical Indications Registry, under the Union Government of India, on 14 August 2019.

Tirur Vettila Ulpadaka Sangam from Tirur, proposed the GI registration of 'Tirur Betel Leaf (Tirur Vettila)'. After filing the application in December 2018, the Betel leaf was granted the GI tag in 2019 by the Geographical Indications Registry in Chennai, making the name "Tirur Betel Leaf (Tirur Vettila)" exclusive to the Betel leaf cultivated in the region. It thus became the first Betel leaf variety from Kerala and the 36th type of goods from Kerala to earn the GI tag.

The prestigious GI tag, awarded by the GI registry, certifies that a product possesses distinct qualities, adheres to traditional production methods, and has earned a reputation rooted in its geographical origin.

== See also ==
- Banaras Pan
- Magahi Paan
