= Vazhavallan =

Vazhavallan Vazhavallan
- Village
- Location in Tamil Nadu, India Vazhavallan (India)
- Coordinates: 8.63°N 78.04°E
- Country: India
- State: Tamil Nadu
- District: Thoothukudi
- Elevation: 13 m (43 ft)

Languages
  - Official: Tamil
- Time zone: UTC+5:30 (IST)
- PIN: 628801
- Vehicle registration: TN92

Vazhavallan is a village located in Thoothukudi district of the state Tamil Nadu, India. It is located in Srivaikundam taluk. Korkaiyaan kaalvai, a stream cuts the village into two halves.

The people living here are mostly Hindu Nadars.

The Adhi Kilakathiyan swami temple, Parama Sakthi Amman temple located here has rich ancient history. The chief god of Adhi Kilakathiyan Swami temple is said to be the last pandya king koon pandyan's son. Now the major work of people is agriculture. This village town was situated in the bank of Thamiraparani.

Vazhavallan is locally well known for a deep bore well which was built under the norms of Tamil Nadu Water Supply and Drainage Board, which supplies the Tamiraparani drinking water.

== Schools ==
- Government Higher Secondary School
- panchayat union primary school

== Temple ==
- Adhi Kilakathiyan Swamy Temple
- Muthumalai Amman Temple
- Sriman Narayasamy Temple
- Arunachi Amman Temple
- Pudhusamy Temple
- Nava Thirupathi
- Nava Kailayam

== Language ==
- Tamil

== Ancient name ==
- SOUTH VALAVALLAN

== River ==
- tamirabarani

== Villagers occupation ==
- Farming AND FISHING AND BEST PLACE
