= Banaras Pan =

Type of Betel leaf variety from Uttar Pradesh, India

Banaras Pan (Betel Leaf) - बनारसी पान
- Geographical indication
- Alternative names: Desi Paan
- Description: Betel leaf (Piper betle) variety cultivated in Uttar Pradesh, India
- Type: Betel leaf
- Area: Varanasi, Jaunpur, Chandauli, Ballia, Ghazipur, Azamgarh, Mirzapur and Sonbhadra districts
- Country: India
- Registered: 31 March 2023
- Official website: ipindia.gov.in

Banaras Pan (Betel Leaf) is an important traditional crop variety of Betel leaf (Piper betle) cultivated in the Indian state of Uttar Pradesh. It is mainly cultivated in the Varanasi, Jaunpur, Chandauli, Ballia, Ghazipur, Azamgarh, Mirzapur, and Sonbhadra districts of Uttar Pradesh.

Under its Geographical Indication tag, it is referred to as "'Banaras Pan (Betel Leaf)".

== Name ==
It is named after its place of origin, the region of Banaras (also known as Varanasi), located in Purvanchal region of Uttar Pradesh. The word "Paan" originates from the Sanskrit term "Parna," meaning leaf. With its roots in ancient India, Paan was consumed not only for its medicinal properties but also for its symbolic auspicious significance. Locally, the Banaras Pan is also known as "Desi Pan".

== Description ==
The Banaras Pan leaf is a dioeciously perennial root climber that thrives in warm and humid climates. It has simple, alternate, ovate, cordate, acuminate or acute, entire, and bright green leaves. The Piper Betel vine, on the other hand, is a tropical shade-loving perennial evergreen vine that can grow up to 6-10 feet in Varanasi conditions. Its leaves are yellowish green to dark green with a glossy upper surface and have a characteristic and pleasant odour.

Banaras Pan is renowned for its high-quality leaves, which are rich in tannins and have a distinctive taste ranging from sweet to pungent due to the presence of essential oils. The Pan growers in the region bundle 200 leaves together, known as a Dholi. Varanasi is a major center for the trade and commerce of Pan leaves, with the Pan Mandi (Pan-Dariba) being a key marketplace. The primary customers are those who prepare paan, mainly large-scale "Paanwari" from Varanasi and surrounding districts, including Bhadohi, Ghazipur, Jaunpur, Prayagraj, Chandauli, and Mirzapur. The Pan Dariba in Varanasi is an important hub for marketing Pan leaves from the surrounding regions.

Betel leaf along with betel nut serve a multitude of purposes, encompassing culinary, medicinal, social, and spiritual uses.

== Religious Significance ==
In Indian culture, betel leaves and betel nuts hold significant importance in Puja rituals. These items are offered to deities at the commencement of every puja ceremony. According to Hindu mythology, the betel plant is considered extremely auspicious, believed to have originated from the divine elixir produced during the churning of the ocean (Samudra Manthana). In Hindu worship, betel leaves are placed in the Pooja Kalasha, a sacred vessel used for rituals. After the completion of worship, the water from the Kalasha is considered sacred and is consumed as "Charnamrit", a symbol of divine blessings. Furthermore, betel leaves play a vital role in Indian weddings, particularly during the 'Kanyadana' ritual.

== Paan (Betel Quid) ==
Also known famously as only "Paan" (Betel Quid) - is a traditional Indian after-dinner treat that consists of a betel leaf filled with various ingredients. The filling typically includes chopped betel nut, slaked lime (chuna) and red katha paste made from the khair tree (Acacia catechu). Assorted other ingredients may also be added. Paan is served folded into a triangle or rolled and is chewed before being spat out or swallowed. With its origins dating back to ancient times, paan is a timeless tradition that originated in India.

"Khayike Paan Banaras Wala" is a classic song featuring Amitabh Bachchan from the 1978 film "Don". The song's lyrics indeed reference the famous Banaras Paan, highlighting its popularity and cultural significance.

== Geographical indication ==
It was awarded the Geographical Indication (GI) status tag from the Geographical Indications Registry, under the Union Government of India, on 31 March 2023.

Department of Horticulture and Food Processing, Government of Uttar Pradesh and Namami Gange Farmer Producer Company Limited from Varanasi, proposed the GI registration of 'Banaras Pan (Betel Leaf)'. After filing the application in December 2020, the Betel leaf was granted the GI tag in 2023 by the Geographical Indication Registry in Chennai, making the name "Banaras Pan (Betel Leaf)" exclusive to the Betel leaf cultivated in the region. It thus became the first Betel leaf variety from Uttar Pradesh and the 47th type of goods from Uttar Pradesh to earn the GI tag.

The GI tag protects the Banaras Pan (Betel Leaf) from illegal selling and marketing, and gives it legal protection and a unique identity.

== See also ==
- Banaras Lal Bharwamirch (Red Pickle chilli)
- Ramnagar Bhanta (Brinjal)
- Magahi Paan
- Tirur Betel Leaf
