= Tiruchendur =

Tiruchendur Tirucheer Alaiwai
- Town
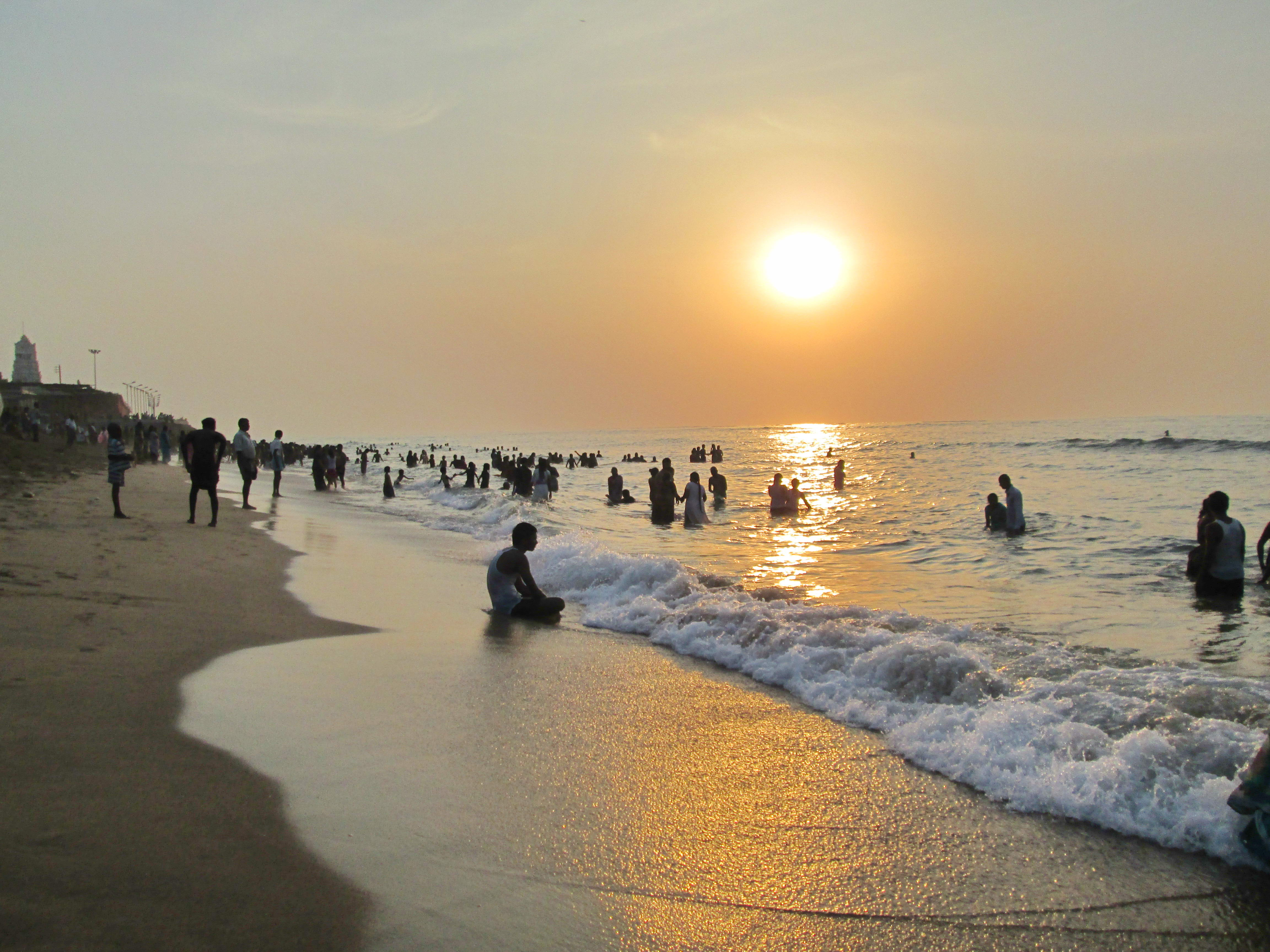
- Tiruchendur beach

- Location within Tamil Nadu Location within India
- Coordinates: 8.494600°N 78.121900°E
- Country: India
- State: Tamil Nadu
- Region: Pandya Nadu
- District: Thoothukudi

Government
  - Type: Municipality
  - Body: Tiruchendur Municipality

Area
  - Total: 24.00 km^{2} (9.27 sq mi)
- Elevation: 32 m (105 ft)

Population (2011)
  - Total: 40,171
  - Density: 1,674/km^{2} (4,335/sq mi)
- Demonym(s): Chendoorkaran, Chendooran

Languages
  - Official: Tamil
- Time zone: UTC+5:30 (IST)
- PIN: 628215
- Telephone code: 04639
- Vehicle registration: TN-92( TN-69 till Jun17,2015)
- Nearest city: Thoothukudi
- Sex ratio: 1000 : 1018.58 ♂/♀
- Literacy: 79%
- Nearest Airport: Thoothukudi
- Lok Sabha constituency: Thoothukudi; Formerly with Tiruchendur
- Vidhan Sabha constituency: Tiruchendur
- Website: www.tiruchendhur.com

Tiruchendur (Tamil: Tiruccentūr [ˈt̪iɾɯtːʃen̪d̪uːr], also jayantipuram, also Thirucheeralaivay) is a town in Thoothukudi district, Tamil Nadu, India. It is home to the Arulmigu Subramaniya Swamy Temple, one of the Six Abodes of Murugan.

== Geography ==
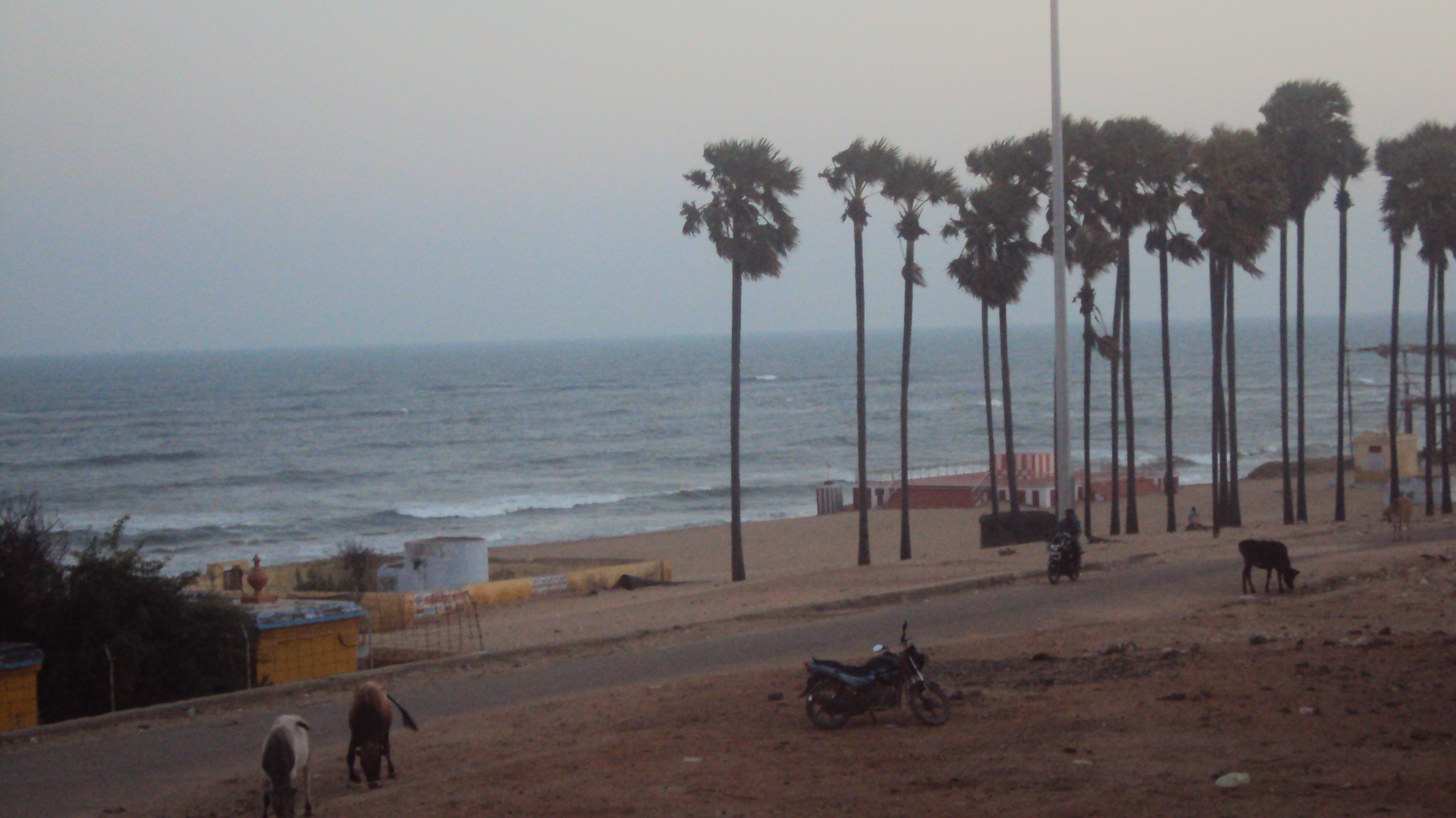
Tiruchendur beach

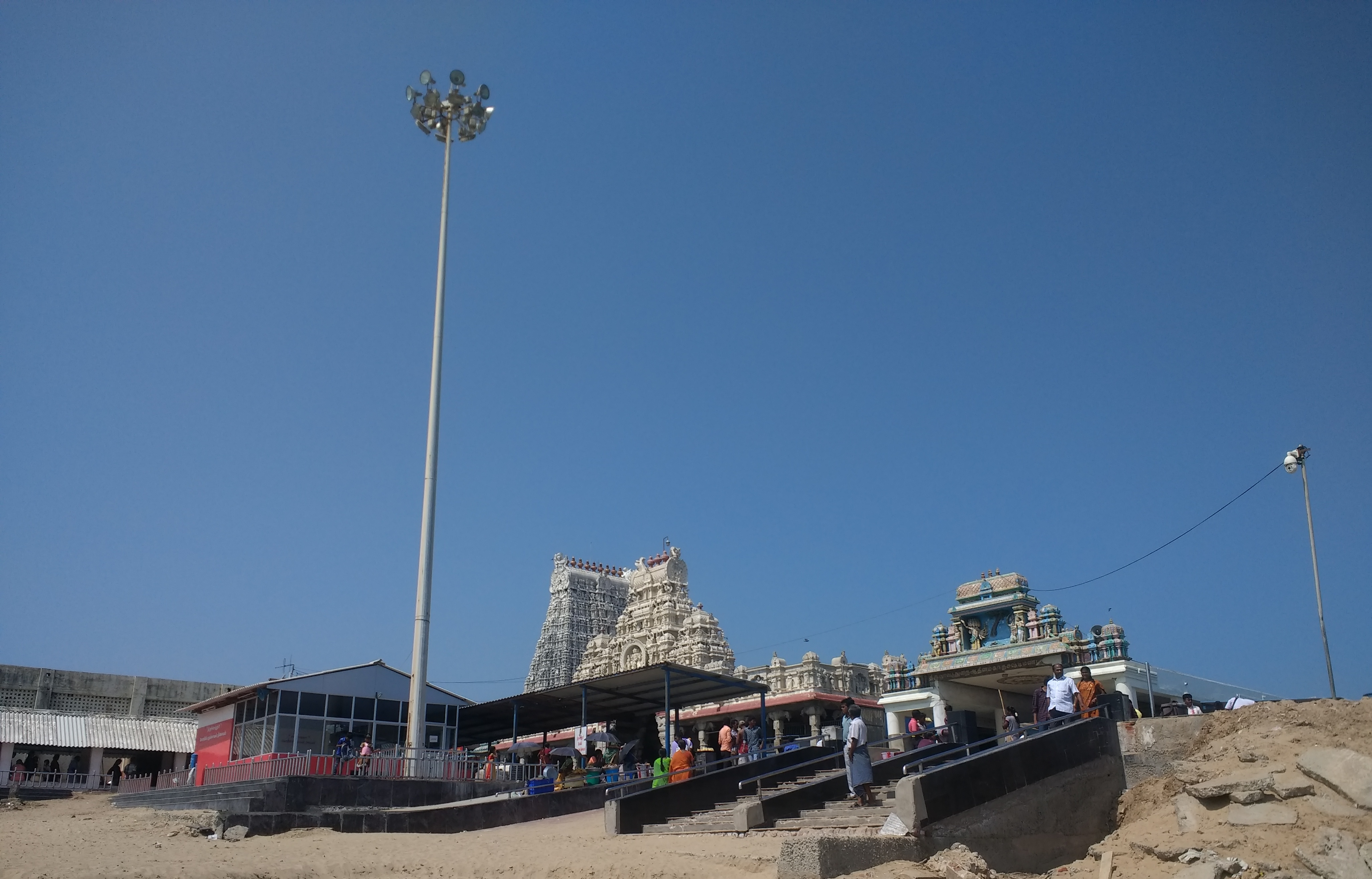

Tiruchendur is located on the shoreline overlooking the Gulf of Mannar in the south-eastern part of Tamil Nadu. The suburban villages surrounding the town contain arid, red soil forests that are densely planted with palm trees, cashew plantations, and other crops part of the region.

== Demographics ==
As of the 2001 Census of India, Tiruchendur had a population of 33,970. Males constituted 50% of the population and females 50%. Tiruchendur had an average literacy rate of 79%, higher than the national average of 59.5%. Male literacy was 82%, and female literacy 76%. 12% of Tiruchendur's population was under 6 years of age.

== Politics ==
The Tiruchendur assembly constituency was part of the Tiruchendur (Lok Sabha constituency) until 2009. After the dissolution of the Lok Sabha constituency in May 2009, the constituency aligned with the Tuticorin Lok Sabha constituency. The current member of the legislative assembly for the Tamil Nadu assembly, elected by the general election 2021, is Anitha R. Radhakrishnan of Dravida Munnetra Kazhagam.

== Public Administration ==
Tiruchendur is managed by the Tiruchendur Municipality, which has 27 wards. It is also a taluk headquarters, and there are 10 local bodies and 46 villages that come under the jurisdiction of Tiruchendur taluk. The District Munsiff Court and Judicial Magistrate Court are located in the town.

== Landmark ==
=== Tiruchendur Murugan Temple ===
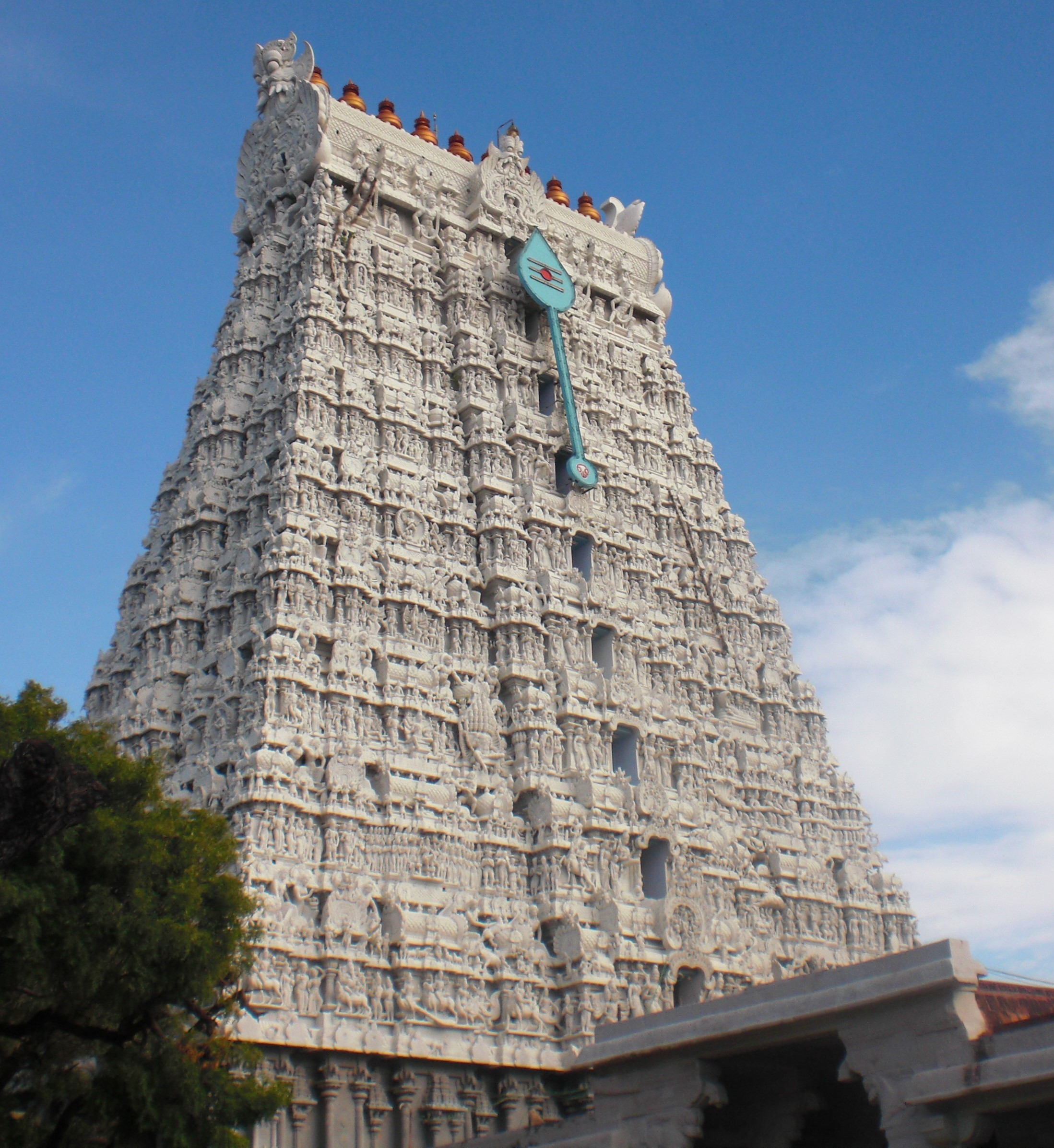
View of the Thiruchedur Temple gopuram

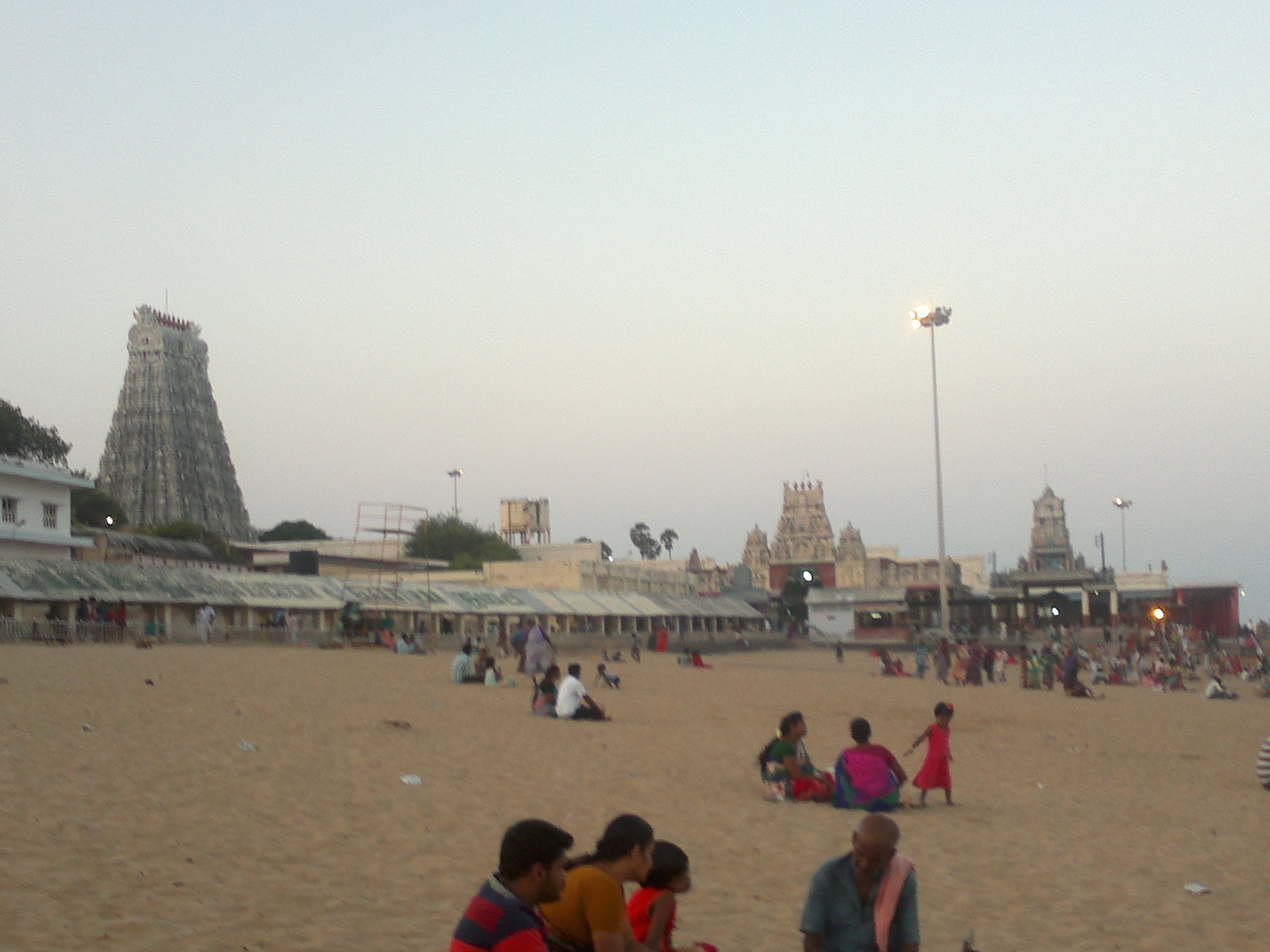
Tiruchendur Murugan Kovil

Arulmigu Subramaniya Swamy Temple, is an ancient Tamil Hindu temple dedicated to Murugan at the site of the battle. It is one of the six major abodes, or sacred temples, of the Kaumaram religion. The temple, which is built near the seashore, measures 91 m (299 ft) north to south, 65 m (213 ft) east to west, and has a seven-tier gopuram that is 42 m (138 ft) high. The Murugan temple at Tiruchendur was occupied by the Dutch East India Company from 1646 to 1648, during the course of their war with the Portuguese.

== Festivals ==
Festivals are celebrated throughout the year at the temple, including Brahmothsavam in the month of Maasi, Vasanthotsavam for 10 days in Chithirai, Vaikasi Visakam for 12 days and Skandha Sashti in Aippasi. There are two Maha Utsavams called Aavani perunthirunaal and Maasi perunthirunaal conducted and celebrated during Aavani and Maasi. These 12-day festivals occur twice every year.

== Gallery ==
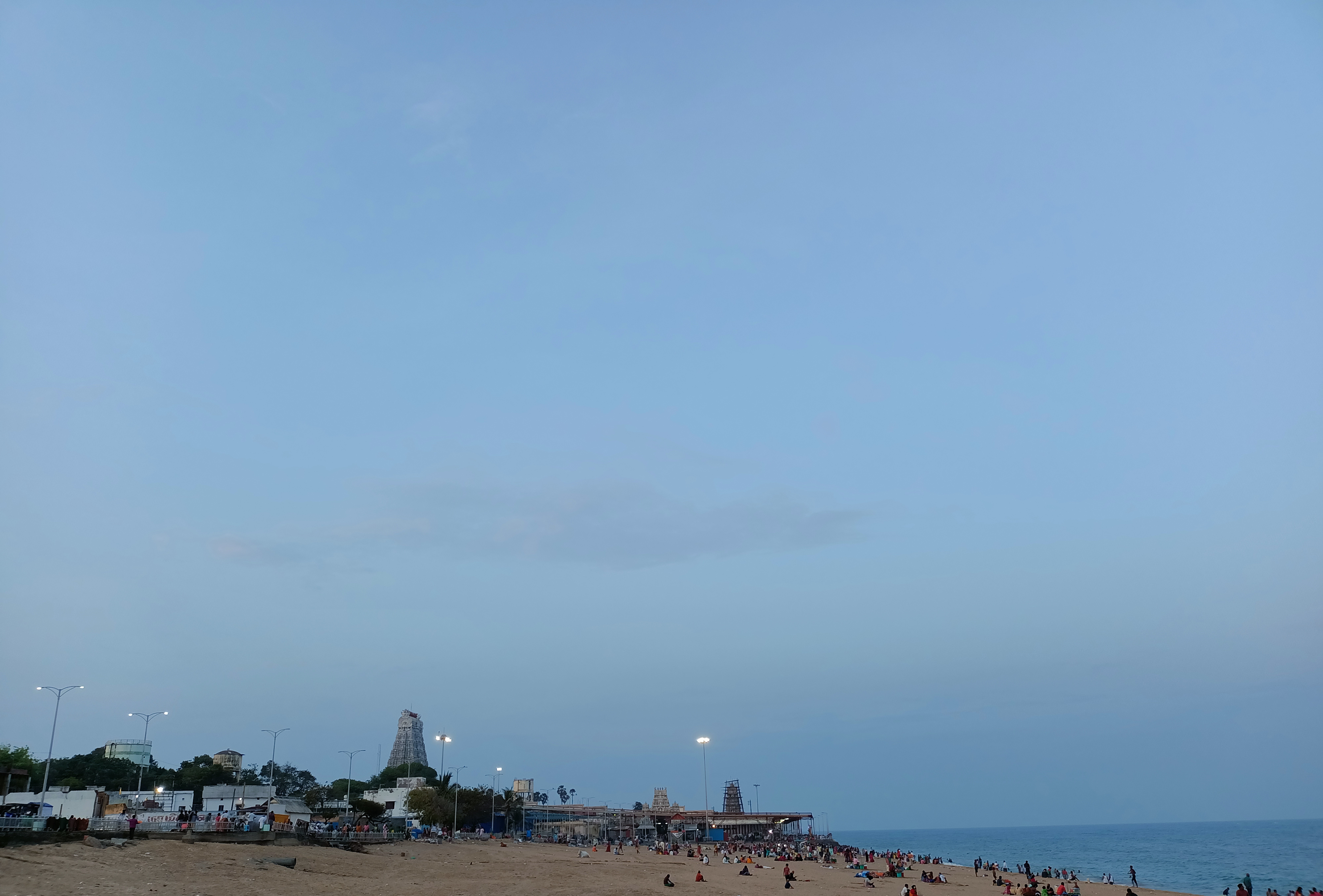
Temple view from Beach

Tiruchendur Temple tower

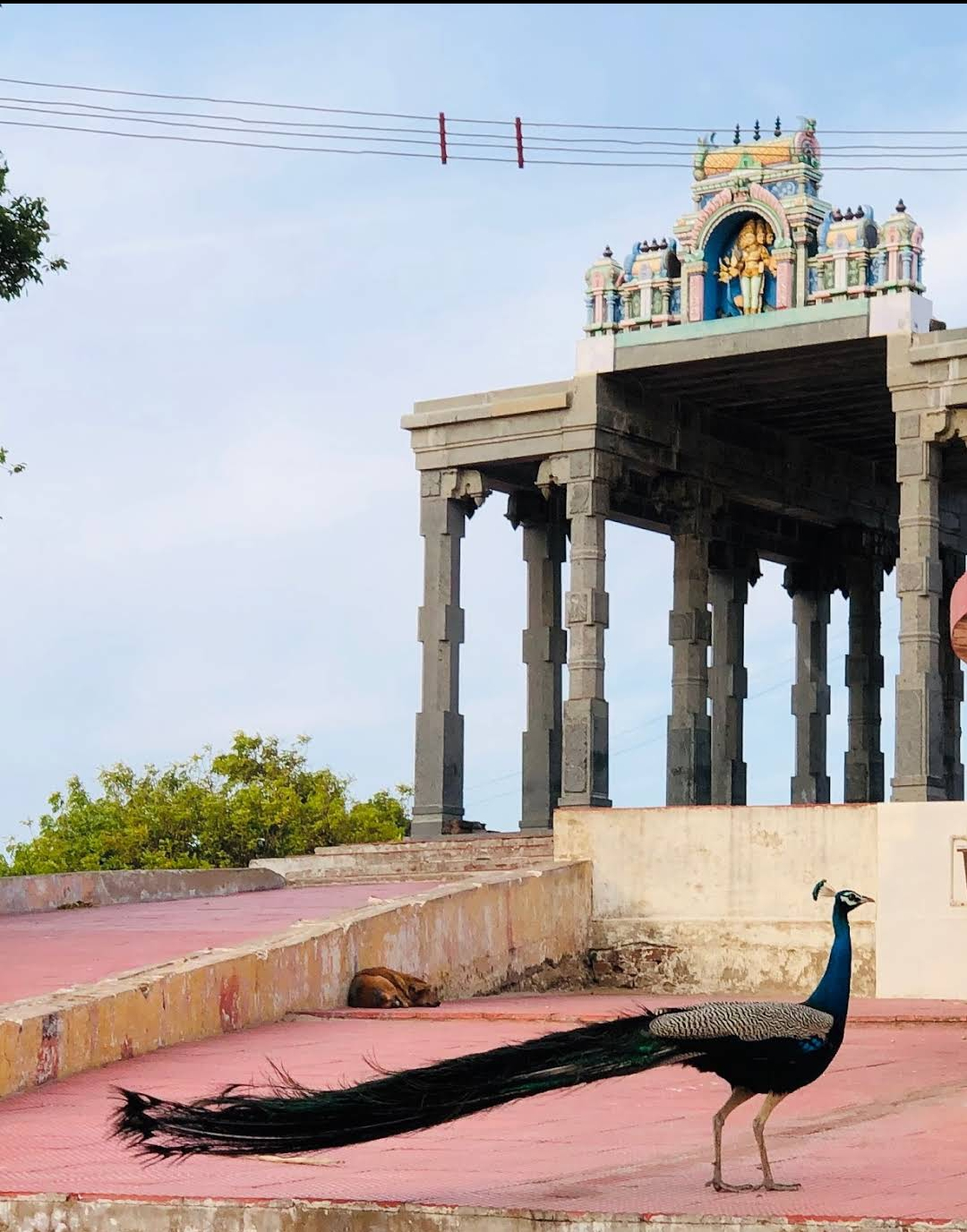
Peacock (lord murugan's vaanganam) at Tiruchendur temple

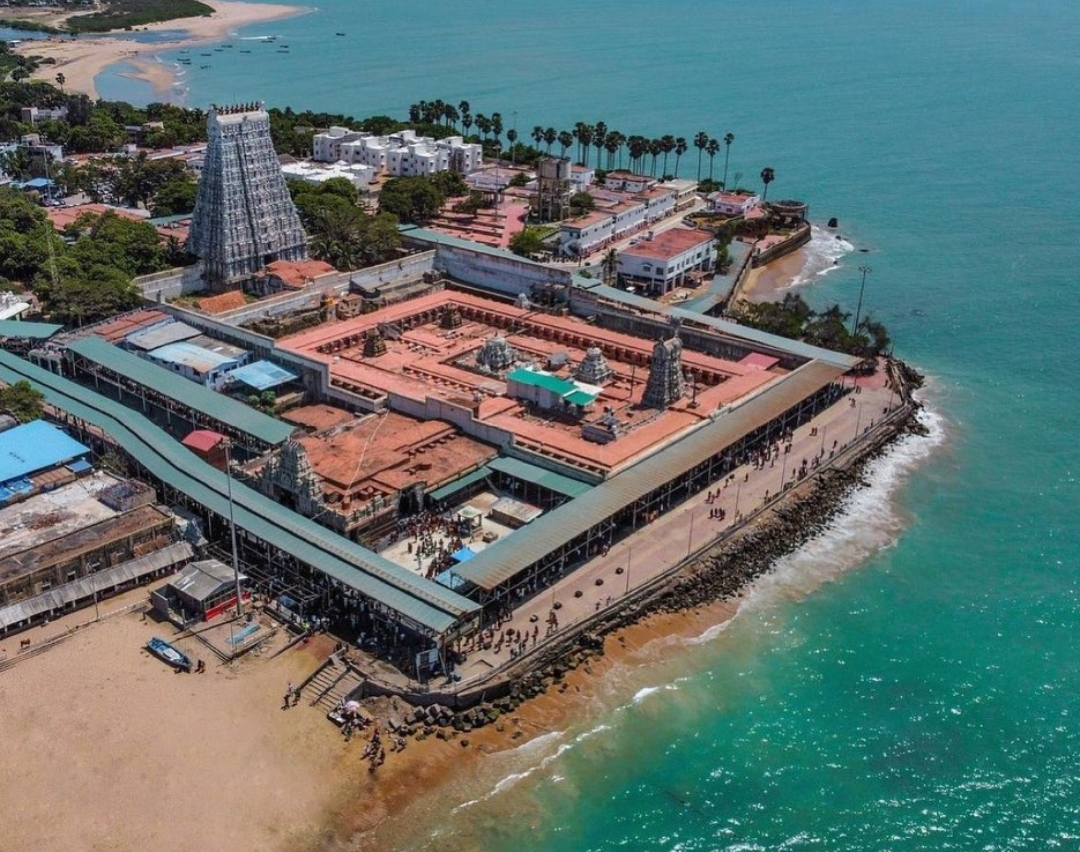
Birdseye view of Tiruchendur Temple

== See also ==
- Virapandianpatnam
- Kulasekarapattinam
- Manapad
- Udangudi
- Sathankulam
- Uvari
- Thoothukudi
- Tirunelveli
- Tiruttani
