= Magahi Paan =

Type of Betel leaf variety from Bihar, India

Magahi Paan (𑂧𑂏𑂯𑂲 𑂣𑂰𑂢)
- Geographical indication
- Description: Betel leaf variety cultivated in Bihar, India
- Type: Betel leaf
- Area: Aurangabad, Gaya, Nawada and Nalanda districts
- Country: India
- Registered: 28 March 2018
- Official website: ipindia.gov.in

Magahi Paan is a traditional crop variety of Betel leaf is cultivated mainly in the Magadh division of the Indian state of Bihar. I t is mainly cultivated in AuraAurangabad.awada and Nal,anda districts of southern Bihar.

Und [2]. r its Geographical Indication tag, it is referred to as "Magahi Paan".

== Name ==
It is named after its place of origin, the ancient Indian region of Magadha located in the southern part of Bihar. The term "Magahi" originates from the word "Magadhi" (From the region of Magadha), which underwent phonological changes from Sanskrit. "Paan" means "leaf" in the local state language of Hindi.

== Description ==
India is home to diverse betelvine varieties, with Magahi being the most expensive due to its tender nature. Magahi Paan, cultivated in the specific 4 districts, is renowned for its quality and premium price. This variety of betel leaf boasts a pungent, less fibrous, and easily soluble betel quid, along with an attractive shiny dark green color and distinct taste. Its excellent keeping quality further adds to its value. Its leaves are also the smallest among all paan cultivars.

Magahi Paan's cultivation serves as a vital source of livelihood for the Chaurasia community. The Chaurasia community, comprising small landholders and marginal farmers, has cultivated betel vine with expertise for generations. Magahi Paan is sold by betel growers in Paan Mandis (markets) in Gaya and Varanasi, typically in units of 200 leaves per "Dholi". Additionally, Magahi Paan is suitable for bleaching, which enhances its shelf life up to 30–35 days.

Notably, Magahi Paan has a sweeter taste than Bangala Paan from West Bengal. Due to its medicinal value, Magahi Paan is commonly used as a mouth freshener, antiseptic, stimulant, and cough reliever. This variety is prized for its soft, smooth, and glossy leaves, which are preferred by "Paan" (Betel Quid) connoisseurs and traders.

The India Post Eastern region, Patna had released a Special Postal Cover to commemorate the Geographical Indication for Magahi Pan (Betelvine) highlighting the significance of Magahi Paan.

== Geographical indication ==
It was awarded the Geographical Indication (GI) status tag from the Geographical Indications Registry, under the Union Government of India, on 28 March 2018.

Magahi Paan Utpadak Kalyan Samiti from Bihar Agricultural University, located in Bhagalpur, proposed the GI registration of 'Magahi Paan'. After filing the application in June 2016, the Betel leaf was granted the GI tag in 2018 by the Geographical Indication Registry in Chennai, making the name "Magahi Paan" exclusive to the Betel leaf cultivated in the region. It thus became the second Betel leaf variety from India and the 11th type of goods from Bihar to earn the GI tag.

The prestigious GI tag, awarded by the GI registry, certifies that a product possesses distinct qualities, adheres to traditional production methods, and has earned a reputation rooted in its geographical origin.

== See also ==
- Marcha rice
