= Navagraha temples in Tamil Nadu =

Location of Nine planets Temple (Navagraham temples)

The Navagraha temples are a set of nine Hindu temples, each dedicated to one of the nine planetary deities, the Navagraham, in various places around the towns of Kumbakonam and Mayiladuthurai in the erstwhile Tanjore region of Southeastern India, present-day Tamil Nadu. The presiding deity in most of the temples is Shiva, with a shrine dedicated to the planetary deity. Leaving Tirunallar Saniswaran Temple which is located in the Karaikal district of the Union Territory of Pondicherry, all the other temples are located in the Cauvery delta districts of Tamil Nadu (Thanjavur, Mayiladuthurai and Tiruvarur), excluding Nagapattinam.

These temples are the most prominent ones in Tamil Nadu and perhaps in overall India. But they are not unique in that Indian state, where other similar sets of planetary deities temples are found, such as the Nava Tirupati and the Nava Kailasam (Navagraha temples).

The present masonry structure for the temples were built during the reign of Medieval Cholas between the 7th and 11th centuries. The temples are constructed in the Dravidian style of architecture, most of the temples have a five-tiered rajagopuram, the gateway tower and a granite wall enclosing all the shrines of the temple. During the Vijayanagar period, renovations and additions were primarily carried out at Suryanar Kovil.

The temples are a part of the popular Navagraham pilgrimage in Tamil Nadu. It is believed that the planetary deities were cursed by Brahma to dwell in Vellurukku Vanam, the white wild flower jungle and were blessed by Shiva to make it their abode to devotees. The temples have six daily rituals at various times from 5:30 a.m. to 9 p.m., and two yearly festivals on its calendar. The temples are maintained and administered by the Hindu Religious and Charitable Endowments Department of the Government of Tamil Nadu.

== Legend ==
As per Hindu legend, Sage Kalava was suffering from serious ailments along with leprosy. He prayed to the Navagrahas, the nine planet deities. The planets were pleased by his devotion and offered cure to the sage. Brahma, the Hindu god of creation, was angered as he felt that the planets have no powers to provide boons to humans. He cursed the nine planets to suffer from leprosy and were sent down to earth in Vellurukku Vanam, the white wild flower, or Sodom's apple forest — the modern time Suryanar Kovil. The planets prayed to Shiva to relieve them off the curse. Shiva appeared to them and said that the place belonged to them and they would have to grace the devotees worshipping them from the place. This is the only temple where there are separate shrines for each of the planet deities.

== The temples ==
Suryanar Kovil is located to the West of Mayiladuthurai (also known as Mayuram or Mayavaram) and East of Kumbakonam, 2 km (1.2 mi) from Aduthurai along the Kumbakonam - Mayiladuthurai road (the NH 136B). The temple has direct connectivity from lower Anicut and Thiruppanandal. Kanjanoor, the temple for Sukran, is located 3 km (1.9 mi) from Suryanar Kovil in the Aduthurai - Mayiladuthurai road. Thingalur, the shrine of Chandra, is located 16 km (9.9 mi) to the North of Thanjavur and 35 km (22 mi) from Kumbakonam, in the Kumbakonam - Tiruvvayyaru Road (the SH 22). Vaitheeswaran Kovil, dedicated to Mangala, is located 14 km (8.7 mi) away from Mayuram, on the Mayiladuthurai - Sirkazhi Road (the NH 136 B). Swetharanyeswarar Temple, hosting Budha, is located in Thiruvenkadu, 24 km (15 mi) away from Mayavaram and 13 km (8.1 mi) to the East of Vaitheeswaran Kovil. Ketu Stalam is located close to Poompuhar, 9 km (5.6 mi) to the South of Thiruvenkadu and 23 km (14 mi) to the South West of Mayuram. Alangudi, where Guru temple is located, is 18 km (11 mi) to the South of Kumbakonam on the Kumbakonam - Mannargudi road (the SH 66). Rahu Stalam is located 6 km (3.7 mi) to the West of Kumbakonam on the Kumbakonam - Karaikal road (SH 147), along which is also situated the Dharbaranyeswarar temple of Tirunallar, the Shani temple, 33 km (21 mi) south of Mayiladuthurai and 34 km (21 mi) from Kethu Stalam.

Out of the nine temples, six are located on the northern bank of the river Kaveri, while the remaining three are on the southern bank. This manner of situating the temples is familiar in the context of the Shaivite sanctuaries of the Saiva Siddhanta faith, known as the Paadal Petra Sthalam. These specific sites were celebrated by three of the most revered Nayanars (Saivite Saints): Appar, Sundarar, and Tirugnana Sambandar, who have glorified the said temples in the Tevaram during the 7th-8th centuries.

Six out of nine temples are closely located within a 30 km (19 mi) radius from the city of Mayiladuthurai.

On the list below, the temples that are also significant Shaivite holy sites (Padal petra stalam), are marked with the color code : *

Name of the temple	Deity	Graha	Day	Location	Photo	Notes/Beliefs
Suryanar Kovil	Hindu Sun-God	Sun	Sunday	Suryanar Kovil		
Kailasanathar Temple	Chandran	Moon	Monday	Thingalur		
Vaitheeswaran Koil	Angaragan	Mars	Tuesday	Vaitheeswaran Koil		
Swetharanyeswarar Temple	Budha	Mercury	Wednesday	Tiruvenkadu		
Apatsahayesvarar Temple	Guru	Jupiter	Thursday	Alangudi		
Agniswarar Temple	Sukran	Venus	Friday	Kanjanur		
Dharbaranyeswarar Temple	Shani	Saturn	Saturday	Thirunallar		
Naganathar Temple	Rahu			Tirunageswaram		
Nagannathaswamy Temple, Keezhaperumpallam	Ketu			Keelaperumpallam		

== History ==
The Suryanar Kovil was built during the reign of Kulottunga Choladeva (AD 1060-1118) and was called Kulottungachola-Marttandalaya. The current granite shrine is believed to have been built by the Vijayanagara Empire. In modern times, most of these temples are maintained and administered by the Hindu Religious and Charitable Endowments Department of the Government of Tamil Nadu. For the Dharbaranye The Suryanar temple is mentioned in the songs of Muthuswami Dikshitar, who has composed a song starting with "Suryamurthe" in Saurashatra ragam.

The temple of Thingalur is associated with the legend of Appar bringing back the life of the son of Appoothi Adigal. The idol of moon is made of black granite and clad in pure white.

Vaitheeswaran Koil has five inscriptions mainly belonging to the period of Kulothunga Chola I (1070-1120 CE). The inscription on the steps of Subramanya shrine records the shutter of the sluice at Sattainathapuram measures 35 inches in length and 8 inches in breadth. The one on the right of the temple tank indicates the tank, Nachiyar shrine, and its hall were completely renovated when Kanderayar was governing the Sigali Simai, and during the management of the temple by Muthukumaraswami Tambiran, a disciple of Sivagnanadesikar-Sambandar of the Dharmapuram Adheenam. On the wall of the second precinct, the inscriptions state that the courtyard of Thayalnayagi shrine, the sacred steps and Tattisuri hall were built during Tamil year 4868 corresponding to 1689 CE. On the floor near accountant's seat registers a deed granted by Sankarabaragiri Rengopanditar by Ambalavanatambiran, an agent of the temple. The Easter gateway inscription indicates the gift of taxes from Manipallam in Tiruvalipparu.

== Architecture ==
There is no specific architecture pattern that uniquely identifies these temples. But all of the temples have a rectangular plan with compound walls, pierced by a tiered raja gopuram (entrance tower). Leaving the Suryanar Kovil, the central shrine is usually that of Shiva in the form of lingam and the shrine of the planetary deity is located in the precinct around the main shrine. All the other eight shrines of the Navagrahas are arranged facing the shrine of Suryanar.

== Worship and festivals ==
The temple priests perform the pooja (rituals) during festivals and on a daily basis. Like most other Shiva temples of Tamil Nadu, the priests belong to the Sivacharyar community, a Tamil Shaivite Brahmin caste. The temple rituals are performed six times a day; Ushathkalam at 5:30 a.m., Kalasanthi at 8:00 a.m., Uchikalam at 10:00 a.m., Sayarakshai at 6:00 p.m., Irandamkalam at 8:00 p.m. and Ardha Jamam at 10:00 p.m. Each ritual comprises four steps: abhisheka (sacred bath), alangaram (decoration), neivethanam (food offering) and deepa aradanai (waving of lamps) for Suryanar, Ushadevi and Chayadevi. The worship is held amidst music with nagaswaram (pipe instrument) and tavil (percussion instrument), religious instructions in the Vedas read by priests and prostration by worshippers in front of the temple mast. There are weekly rituals like somavaram and sukravaram, fortnightly rituals like pradosham and monthly festivals like amavasai (new moon day), kiruthigai, pournami (full moon day) and sathurthi.

These temples constitute the popular Navagraha pilgrimage in Tamil Nadu. The planets are believed to influence the horoscope computed based on time of one's birth and subsequently influence the course of life. Each of the planets are believed to move from a star to another during a predefined period and thus sway over an individual's fortunes. The Navagrahas, as per Hindu customs, are believed to provide both good and bad effects for any individual and the bad effects are mitigated by prayers. As in other Navagraha temples, the common worship practises of the devotees include offering of cloth, grains, flowers and jewels specific to the planet deity. Lighting a set of lamps is also commonly followed in the temples.
