= Vaitheeswarankoil =

- town
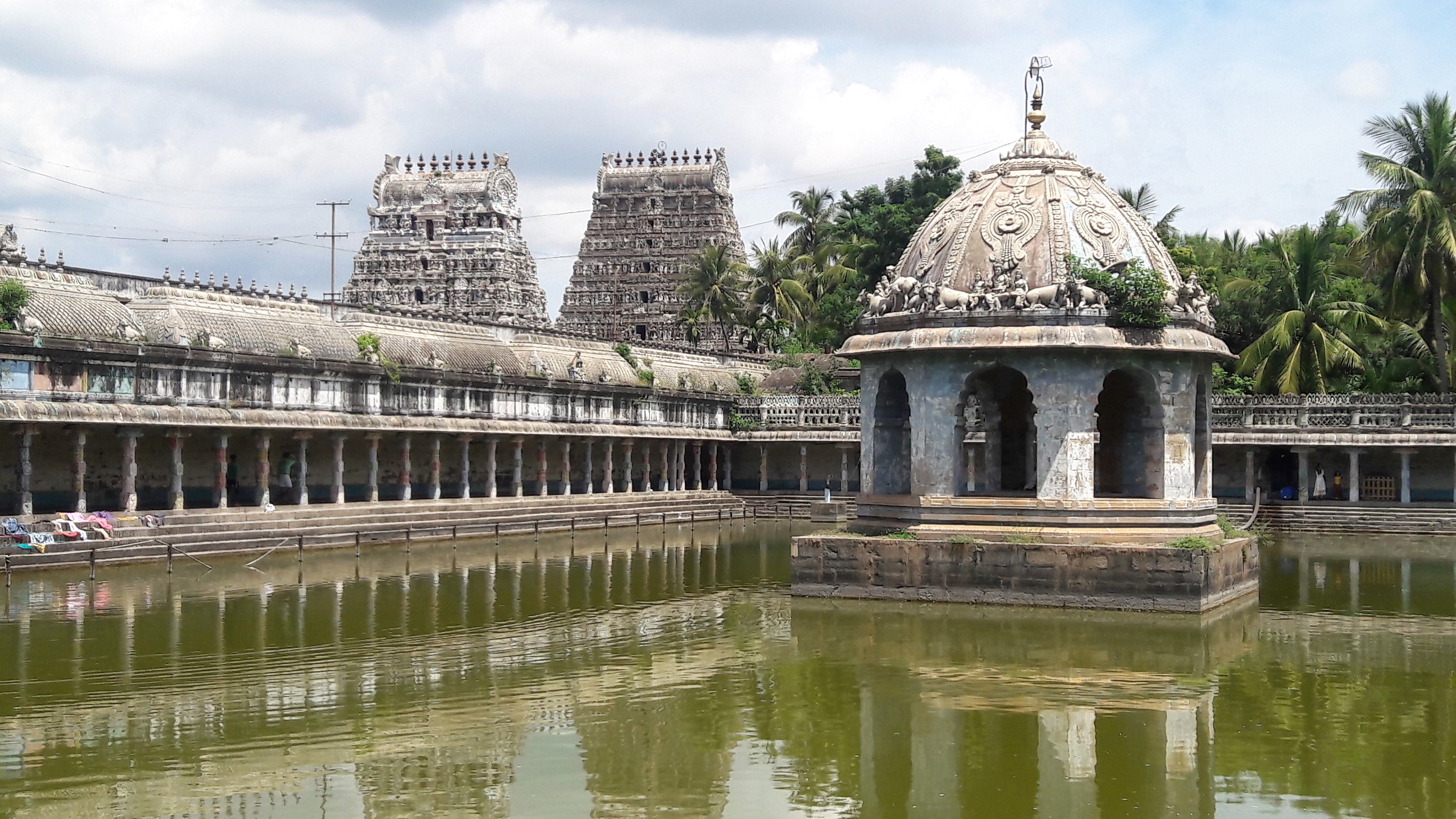
- Vaitheeswaran Temple

- Location in Tamil Nadu, India
- Coordinates: 11°12′N 79°44′E
- Country: India
- State: Tamil Nadu
- District: Mayiladuthurai

Population (2001)
  - Total: 7,522

Languages
  - Official: Tamil
- Time zone: UTC+5:30 (IST)
- Telephone code: +91–4364
- Vehicle registration: TN-82

Vaitheeswarankoil is a panchayat town in Mayiladuthurai district in the Indian state of Tamil Nadu.

== Demographics ==
As of 2001 India census, Vaitheeswarankoil had a population of 7522. Males constitute 50% of the population and females 50%. Vaitheeswarankoil has an average literacy rate of 73%, higher than the national average of 59.5%: male literacy is 80%, and female literacy is 67%. In Vaitheeswarankoil, 11% of the population is under 6 years of age.

== See also ==
- Vaitheeswaran Koil
- Thiruchendur Murugan Temple
- Nadi astrology
- Vibhuti
