= Thingalur =

Town in India

Thingalur is a town situated near Papanasam. It is located at a distance of 18 kilometres from Thanjavur. It is one of the nine Navagraha Sthalas of the Cauvery Delta region and has a temple dedicated to Chandra, the Hindu Moon god, enshrined in the Kailasanathar Sivalaya. It is the birthplace of Apputhi Adigal. One of the 63 Nayanar.
