= Kailasanathar Temple, Thingalur =

Navagraha temple in Tamil Nadu

Chandiranaar Temple
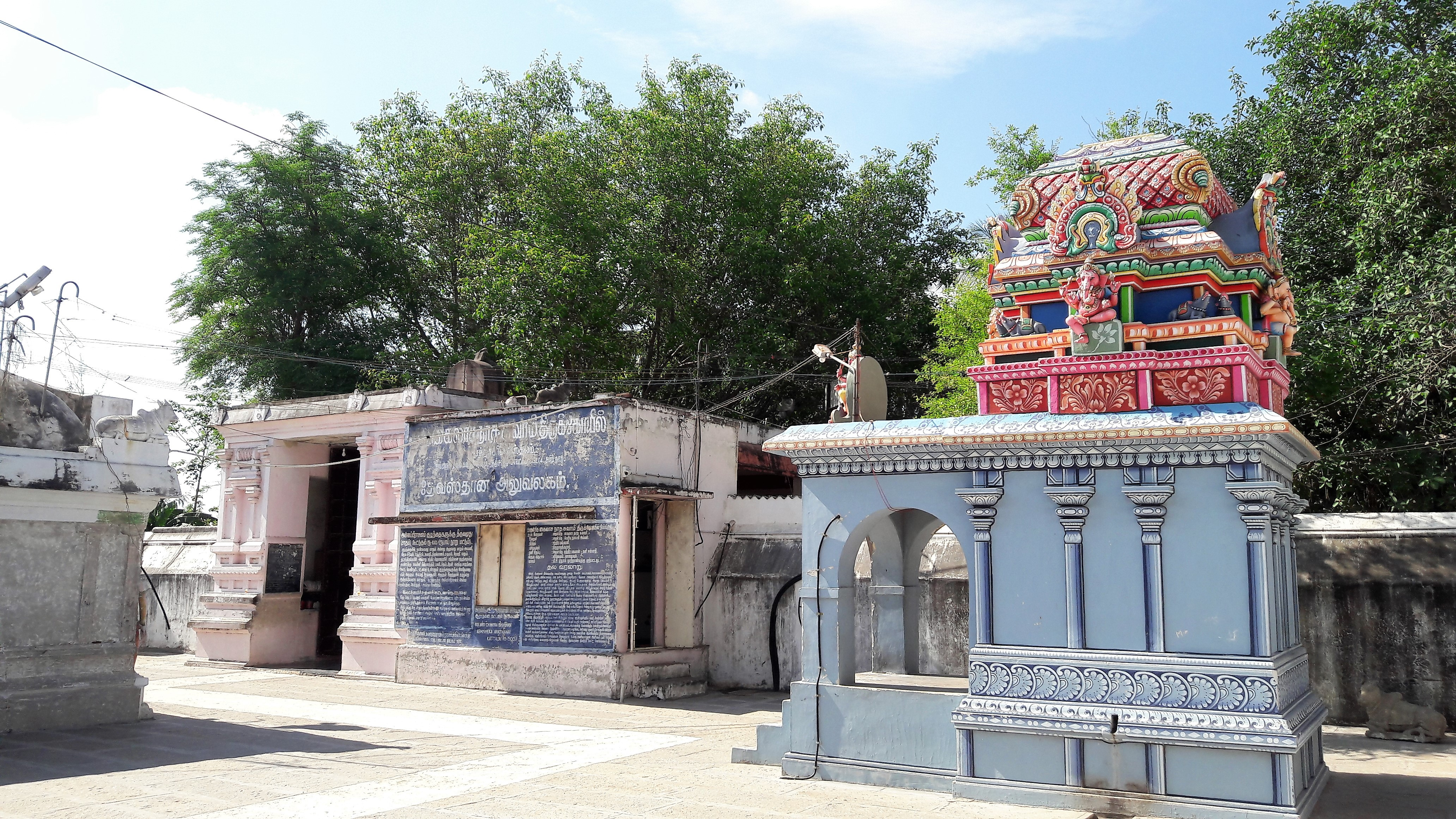

- Location in Tamil Nadu

Religion
- Affiliation: Hinduism
- District: Thanjavur
- Deity: Kailasanathar(Shiva)

Location
- Location: Thingalur
- State: Tamil Nadu
- Country: India
- Coordinates: 10°53′12″N 79°7′32″E

Architecture
- Type: Dravidian architecture

The Chandiranaar Temple (also called Kailasanathar temple or Thingalur temple) is a Hindu temple in the village of Thingalur, 16 kilometres (9.9 mi) from Thanjavur and 33 kilometres (21 mi) from Kumbakonam on the Kumbakonam - Thiruvaiyaru road in the South Indian state of Tamil Nadu. The presiding deity is Soma (moon). However, the main idol in the temple is that of Kailasanathar or Shiva. The temple is considered one of the nine Navagraha temples in Tamil Nadu. Thingalur is the birthplace of Appothi Adigal, one of the 63 nayanmars of lord Shiva and an ardent devotee of saint Thirunavukkarasar, though the temple has no assets related to the saint.

The temple has four daily rituals at various times from 6:00 a.m. to 8:30 p.m., and four yearly festivals on its calendar. Mahasivarathri, Margazhi Thiruvadirai, Panguni Uthiram and Thirukartigai are the major festivals celebrated in the temple. The village finds cursory mention in the 7th century Tamil Saiva canonical work, the Tevaram, written by Tamil saint poets known as the Nayanars and classified as Vaippu Sthalam.

The original complex is believed to have been built by Cholas, while the present masonry structure was built during the Nayak during the 16th century. In modern times, the temple is maintained and administered by the Hindu Religious and Charitable Endowments Department of the Government of Tamil Nadu. The temple is famous for first feeding of rice to infant children.

== Legend ==
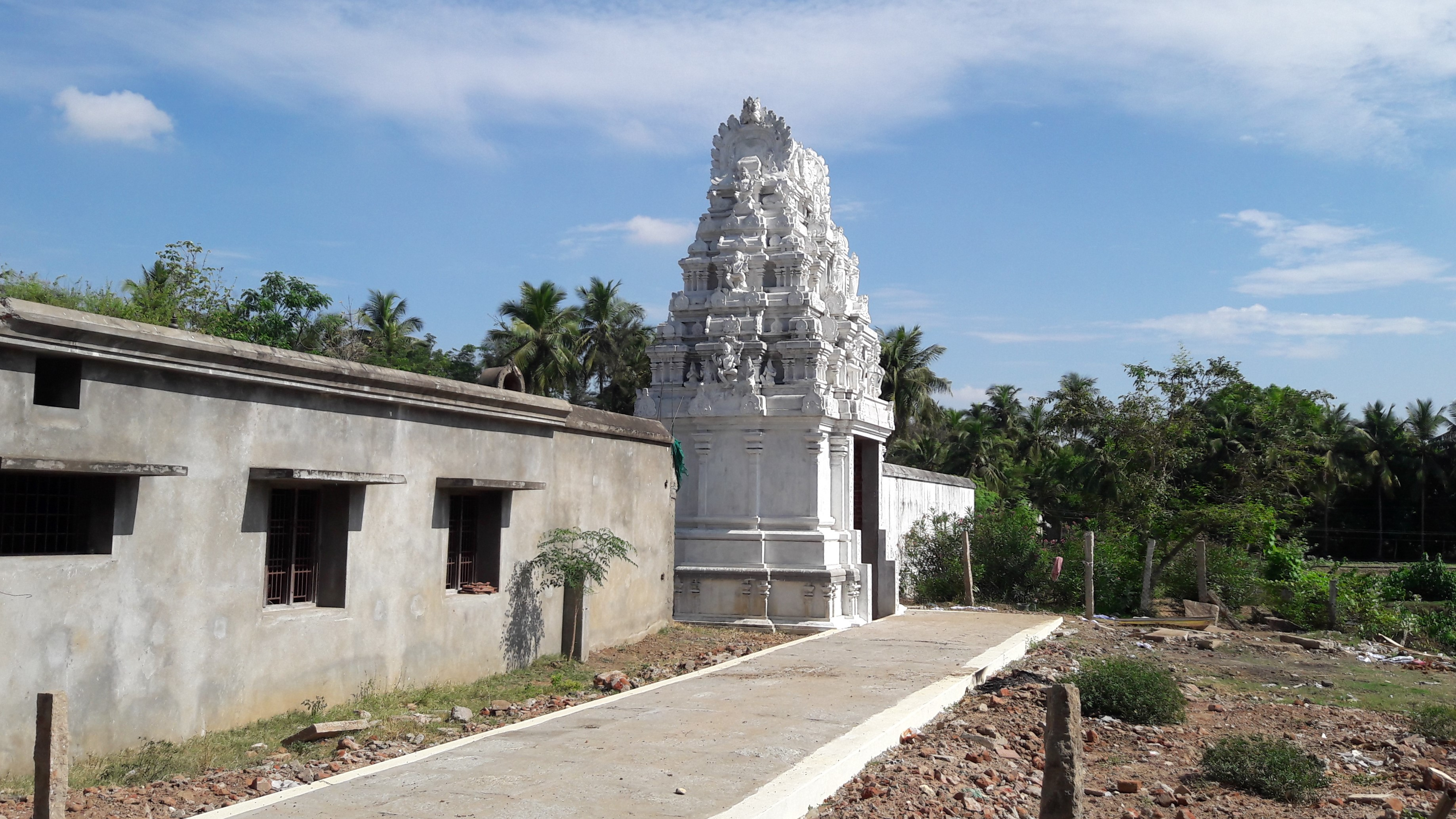
Newly built gopuram of the temple

Legend has it that there lived a merchant Appoodi Adikal, a nayanar in the village of Thingalur who was a devotee of Shiva. Appoodi Adikal held Thirunavukkarasar in high regard. He had many establishments in the village named after Thirunavukkarasar. One day, Appar (Thirunavukkarasar) arrived at Thingalur and was surprised to see many establishments in his name. Apoodi Adigal was very ecstatic to meet the beloved saint in person and launched a grand feast. He sent his son to pick plantain leaves who was killed by a venomous snake bite while the saint was being hosted. Appar, moved by Appoodi Adikal's devotion is said to have miraculously restored the lad to life. During the Tamil month of Purattasi (Sep - Oct) and Panguni (March - April), moonlight falls directly on the image of the presiding deity. As per another legend, Chandra (moon), the handsome looking deity, married 28 daughters of Dakkan. He showed preference only to the last one among them, which infuriated the others. They all complained to Dakkan, who cursed the moon to lose all his powers. Chandra is believed to have worshipped Kailasanathar at this place and was restored all his powers.

== Architecture ==
The temple is located in the village of Thingalur, 33 kilometres (21 mi) from Kumbakonam on the Kumbakonam - Thiruvayyar road and 18 km (11 mi) away from Thanjavur. The temple has a recently built three-tiered rajagopuram surrounded by single prakaram, closed precincts of the temple. The place is revered by the verses of Appar, but since there is no mention of the deity, it is not classified as Padal petra stalam. The image of Chandra is located in the first precinct and houses the image made of black granite and usually clad with a white cloth. The temple tank is named Chandrapushkarani. The gopuram and the central shrine faces East, while the main entrance faces South. There are other shrines for Ambal, Subramanya, Gajalakshmi and Bhairavar. In modern times, the temple is maintained and administered by the Hindu Religious and Charitable Endowments Department of the Government of Tamil Nadu.

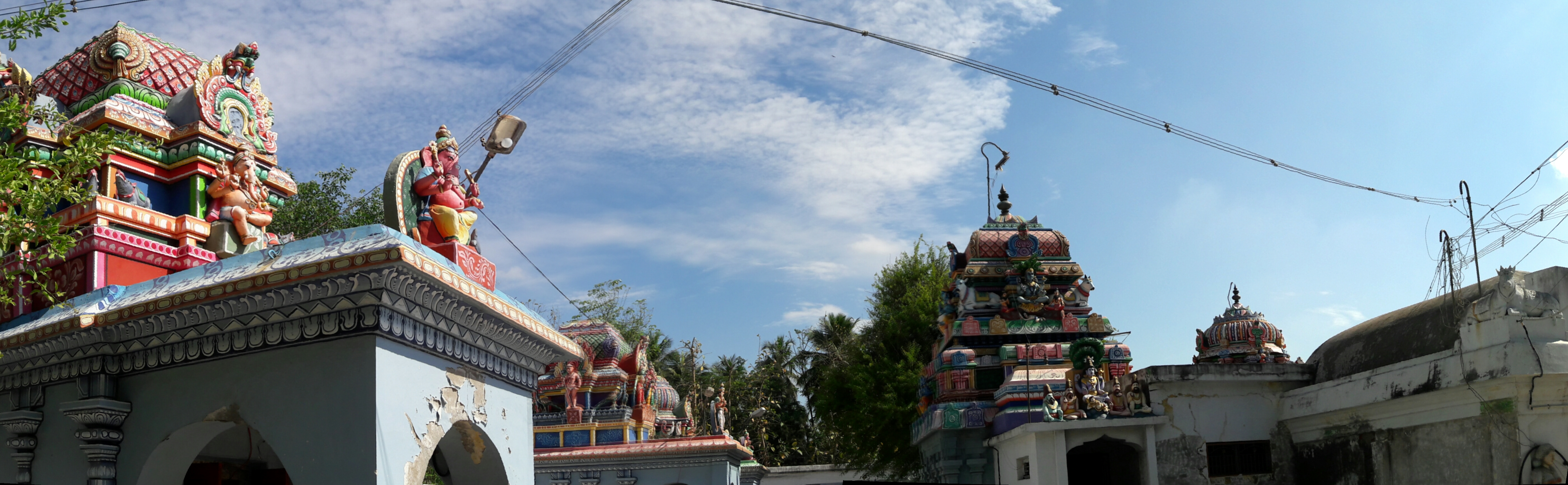
Panoramic view of the temple

== Religious importance ==
The temple is one of the nine Navagraha temples of Tamil Nadu and is a part of the popular Navagraha pilgrimage in the state - it houses the image of Moon (called Thingal locally). The planets are believed to influence the horoscope computed based on time of one's birth and subsequently influence the course of life. Each of the planets is believed to move from one star to another during a predefined period and thus sway over an individual's fortunes. The Navagrahas, as per Hindu customs, are believed to provide both good and bad effects for any individual and the bad effects are mitigated by prayers. As in other Navagraha temples, the common worship practices of the devotees include an offering of cloth, grains, flowers and jewels specific to the planetary deity. Lighting a set of lamps is also commonly followed in the temple. As per contemporary Saivite belief, the energies distributed cyclically by Navagrahas can be channelled based on remedial measures. As per local legends, Shiva, the overlord of the nine planetary deities, allowed them to freely grant wishes based on the devotion of the devotees. The village finds cursory mention in the 7th century Tamil Saiva canonical work, the Tevaram, written by Tamil saint poets known as the Nayanars and classified as Vaippu Sthalam. The temple is frequented by devotees with mental illness and familial problems.

== Worship and festivals ==
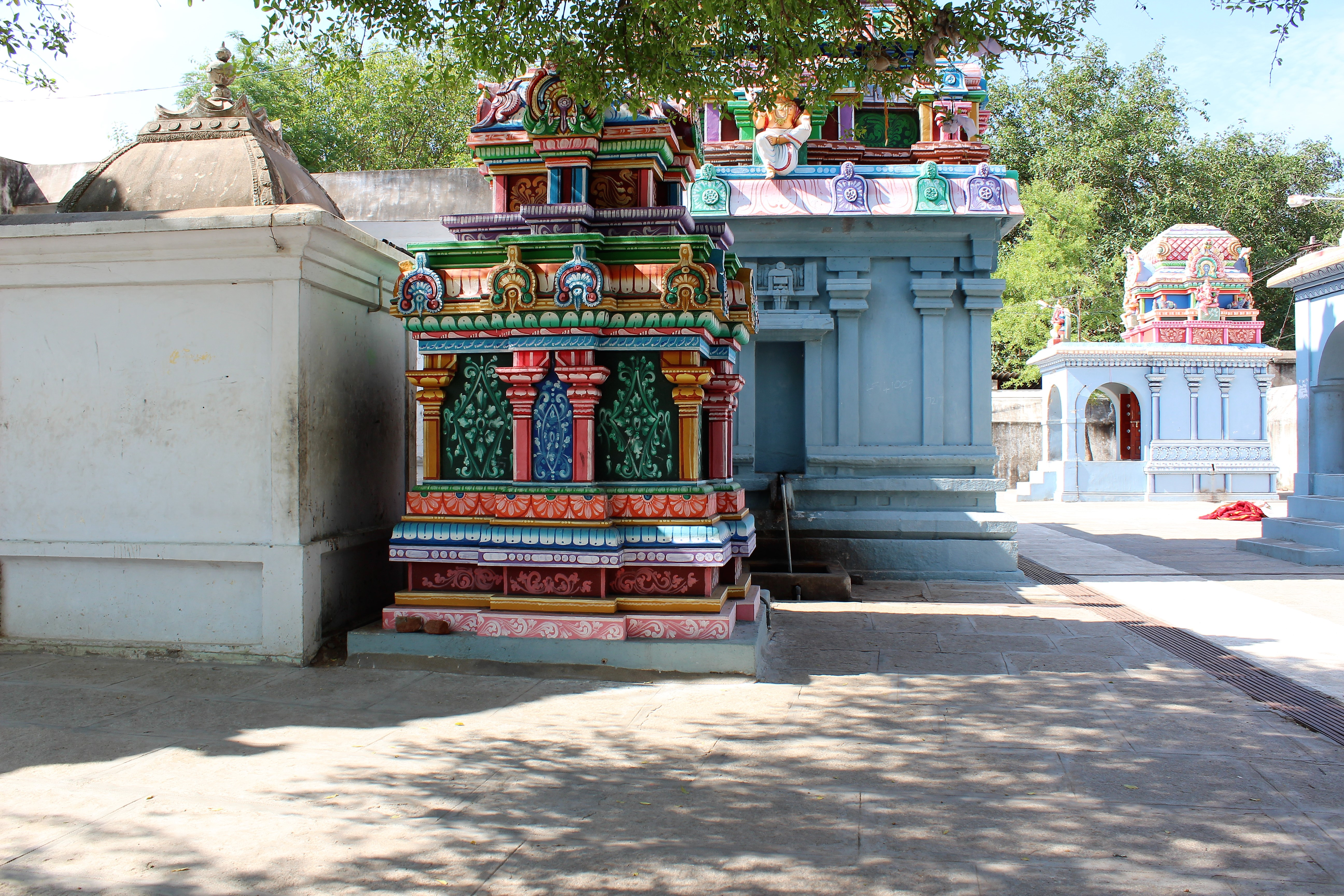
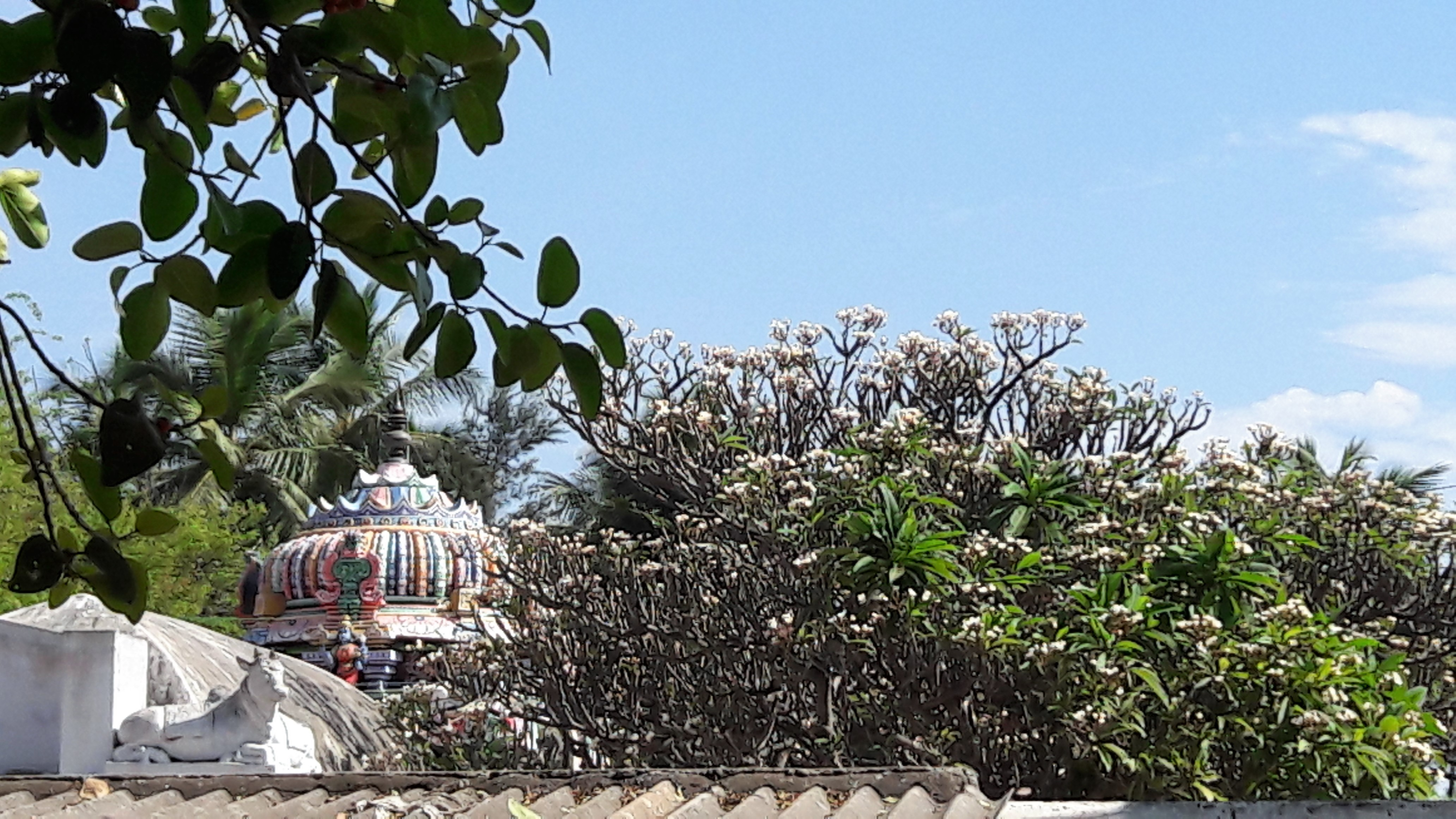
Shrines in the temple

The temple priests perform the pooja (rituals) during festivals and on a daily basis. Like other Shiva temples of Tamil Nadu, the priests belong to the Shaivaite community, a Brahmin sub-caste. The temple rituals are performed six times a day; Ushathkalam at 5:30 a.m., Kalasanthi at 8:00 a.m., Uchikalam at 10:00 a.m., Sayarakshai at 6:00 p.m., Irandamkalam at 8:00 p.m. and Ardha Jamam at 10:00 p.m. Each ritual comprises four steps: abhisheka (sacred bath), alangaram (decoration), neivethanam (food offering) and deepa aradanai (waving of lamps) for Surya, Usha and Chhaya. The worship is held amidst music with nagaswaram (pipe instrument) and tavil (percussion instrument), religious instructions in the Vedas read by priests and prostration by worshippers in front of the temple mast. There are weekly rituals like somavaram and sukravaram, fortnightly rituals like pradosham and monthly festivals like amavasai (new moon day), kiruthigai, pournami (full moon day) and sathurthi. Mahasivarathri, Margazhi Thiruvadirai, Panguni Uthiram and Thirukartigai are the major festivals celebrated in the temple. The temple is famous for first feeding of rice to infant children.
