= Agniswarar Temple, Kanjanur =

Navagraha temple in Tamil Nadu

Agniswarar Temple
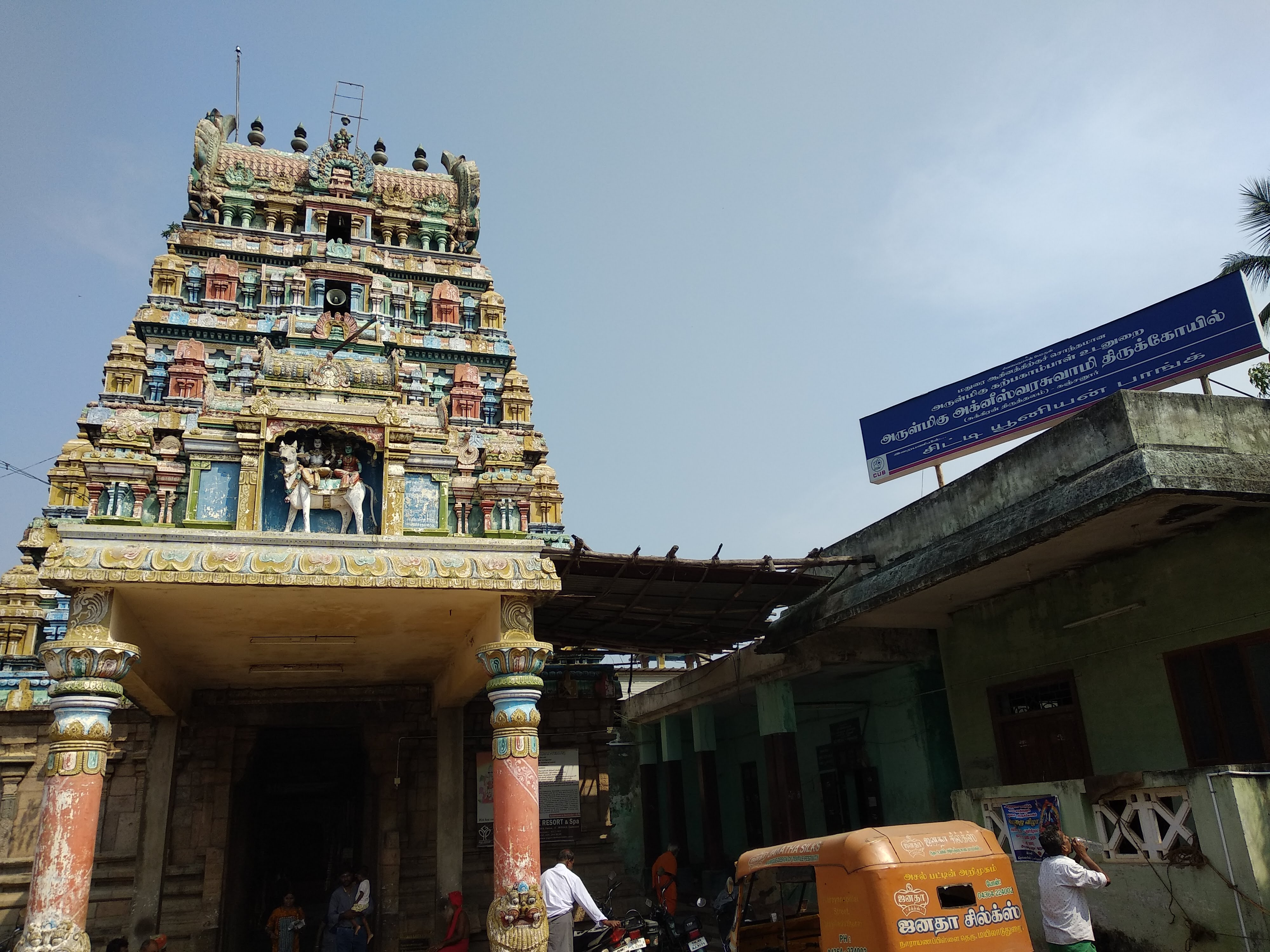

- Location in Tamil Nadu

Religion
- Affiliation: Hinduism
- District: Thanjavur
- Deity: Agniswarar(Shiva) Karpagambigai(Parvathi)
- Features: Temple tank: Agni Theertham, Parasara Theertham

Location
- Location: Kanjanur
- State: Tamil Nadu
- Country: India
- Coordinates: 11°3′57″N 79°29′45″E

Architecture
- Type: Dravidian architecture

The Agniswarar Temple (கஞ்சனூர் அக்கினீஸ்வரர் கோயில்) is a Hindu temple in the village of Kanjanur, 18 kilometres north-east of Kumbakonam. The presiding deity is Sukra (Venus). However, the main idol in the temple is that of "Agniswarar" or Shiva. In concordance with the Saivite belief that Shiva is all-pervading, Sukra is believed to be located within the stomach of the idol of Shiva.

== Architecture ==
The temple is located in Kanjanur, a village 18 km (11 mi) north-east of Kumbakonam on the Kumbakonam - Aduthurai road and 57 km (35 mi) from Thanjavur. The temple was built by the Medieval Cholas and renovated by the kings of the Vijayanagar Empire. The temple has a 5-tier rajagopuram surrounded by two prakarams (closed precincts of a temple). The temple is revered by the verses of Appar and hence referred as Padal petra stalam. It is one of the shrines of the Vaippu Sthalams sung by Tamil Saivite Nayanar Appar.

== History and Legend ==
Legend is that Siva blessed Parasara muni (sage) here with cosmic dance. It is believed that Shiva appeared in the form of Sukra to propitiate himself off the dosha of Sukran.The Agniswarar Temple in Kanjanur has a rich history dating back many centuries. It is one of the prominent Navagraha temples, each associated with a celestial body in Hindu astrology. The temple is particularly linked to the planet Sukran (Venus).

The ancient scriptures and legends associated with the temple narrate its significance in mitigating the malefic effects of Venus and bringing positive influences to the lives of devotees. The architecture and inscriptions within the temple provide glimpses into the cultural and religious practices of the region during different historical periods.

Devotees visit the Agniswarar Temple to participate in rituals, offer prayers, and seek divine blessings. The historical and cultural context of the temple adds to its spiritual significance for those who visit and worship there. The temple is counted as one of the temples built on the northern banks of River Kaveri.

== Navagraha ==
The temple is one of the nine Navagraha temples of Tamil Nadu and is a part of the popular Navagraha pilgrimage in the state - it houses the image of Sukra (Venus).
