= Nagannathaswamy Temple, Keelaperumpallam =

Navagraha temple in Tamil Nadu

Naganatha Swamy Temple
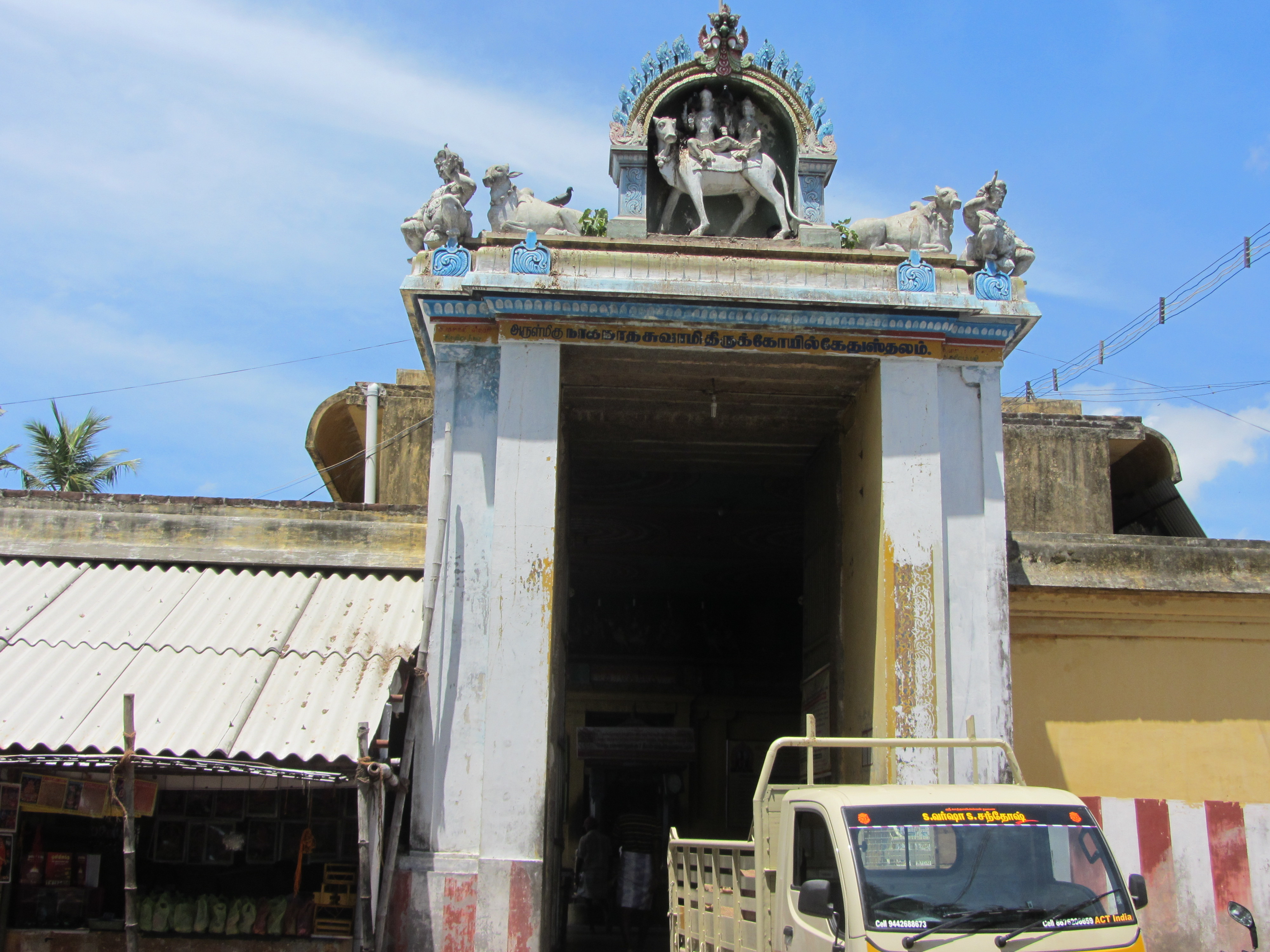

- Location in Tamil Nadu

Religion
- Affiliation: Hinduism
- District: Mayiladuthurai
- Deity: Naganatha Swamy(Shiva) Sowndara Nayagi(Parvathi)
- Features: Temple tank: Naga Theertham

Location
- Location: Keelaperumpallam
- State: Tamil Nadu
- Country: India
- Interactive map of Naganatha Swamy Temple
- Coordinates: 11.1351°N 79.8353°E

Architecture
- Type: Dravidian architecture

Website
- http://kethutemple.org/

The Naganatha Swamy Temple or Kethu Sthalam is a Hindu temple in the village of Keelaperumpallam, 2 kilometres from Poompuhar. The presiding deity is Ketu, a shadow planet. However, the main idol in the temple is that of Naganatha Swamy or Shiva. The temple has a flat rajagopuram surrounded by two prakaram (closed precincts of a temple).

The temple has four daily rituals at various times from 6:00 a.m. to 8:30 p.m., and four yearly festivals on its calendar. Mahasivarathri, Margazhi Thiruvadirai, Panguni Uthiram and Thirukartigai are the major festivals celebrated in the temple. The village finds cursory mention in the 7th-century Tamil Saiva canonical work, the Tevaram, written by Tamil saint poets known as the Nayanars and classified as Vaippu Sthalam.

The original complex is believed to have been built by Cholas, while the present masonry structure was built during the Nayak during the 16th century. In modern times, the temple is maintained and administered by the Hindu Religious and Charitable Endowments Department of the Government of Tamil Nadu. The temple is one of the nine Navagraha temples of Tamil Nadu and is a part of the popular Navagraha pilgrimage in the state - it houses the image of Ketu.

== Legend ==
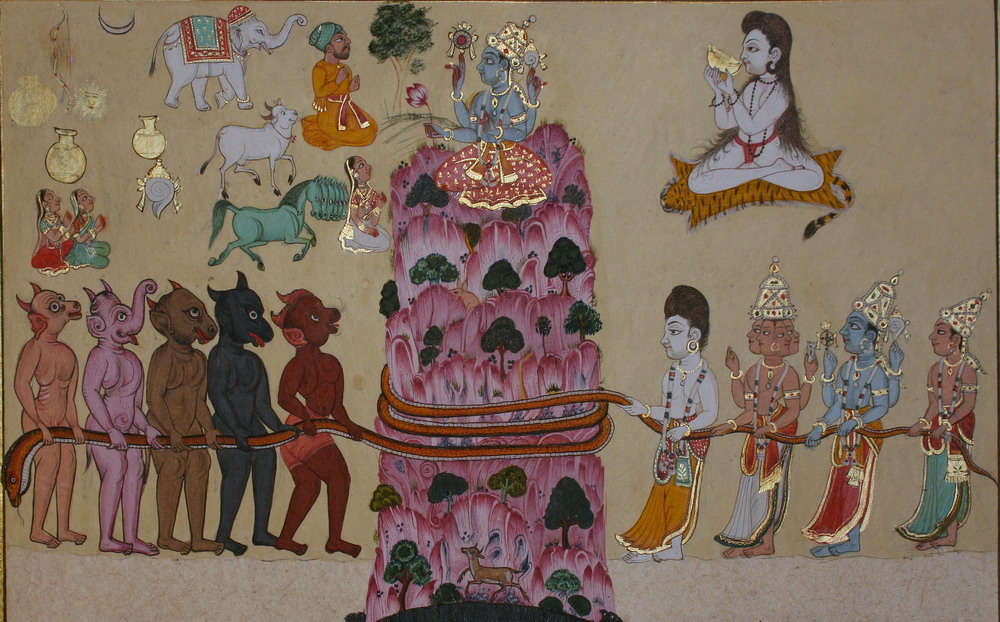
The churning of Ocean of milk

As per Hindu legend, to obtain Amrita – the nectar of immortal life, the Ocean of Milk was churned. At the suggestion of Vishnu, the devas and asuras churn the primeval ocean in order to obtain Amrita which will guarantee them immortality. To churn the ocean they used the Serpent, Vasuki, for their churning-string. For a churning pole they used Mount Mandara placed on the back of a Great Tortoise – the Kurma Avatar of Vishnu. As the gods and demons churned the sea, the terrible poison Halahala issued from its depths and began to envelop the universe with its choking fumes. The devas went to Shiva for rescue who drank the poison the neutralize it. Vasuki was very upset that her mistake resulted in the issue. She prayed to Shiva to propitiate her sins. Shiva was pleased with her devotion and appeared as Naganathar in this place.

== Architecture ==
The temple is located in Keelaperumpallam, a village located 2 km (1.2 mi) from Poompuhar and 93 km (58 mi) from Thanjavur on the Thanjavur - Poompuhar road. The temple has a recently built flat rajagopuram surrounded by single prakaram, closed precincts of the temple. The place is revered by the verses of Appar, but since there is no mention about the deity, it is not classified as Padal petra stalam. The image of Ketu is located in the first precinct and houses the image made of black granite. The shrine faces West and shown worshipping the presiding deity. The image of Vinayaka in the temple is called Anugraha Vinayaka. The gopuram and the central shrine faces East, while the other entrance faces South towards the shrine of Ambal. There are other shrines for Ambal, Subramanya, Gajalakshmi and Bhairavar. In modern times, the temple is maintained and administered by the Hindu Religious and Charitable Endowments Department of the Government of Tamil Nadu.

== Religious importance ==
The temple is one of the nine Navagraha temples of Tamil Nadu and is a part of the popular Navagraha pilgrimage in the state - it houses the image of Ketu. The planets are believed to influence the horoscope computed based on time of one's birth and subsequently influence the course of life. Each of the planets are believed to move from a star to another during a predefined period and thus sway over an individual's fortunes. The Navagrahas, as per Hindu customs, are believed to provide both good and bad effects for any individual and the bad effects are mitigated by prayers. As in other Navagraha temples, the common worship practises of the devotees include offering of cloth, grains, flowers and jewels specific to the planet deity. Lighting a set of lamps is also commonly followed in the temple. As per contemporary Saivite belief, the energies distributed cyclically by Navagrahas can be channeled based on remedial measures. As per local legends, Shiva, the overlord of the nine planetary deities, allowed them to freely grant wishes based on devotion of the devotees.

== Worship and festivals ==
The temple priests perform the pooja (rituals) during festivals and on a daily basis. Like other Shiva temples of Tamil Nadu, the priests belong to the Shaivaite community, a Brahmin sub-caste. The temple rituals are performed six times a day; Ushathkalam at 5:30 a.m., Kalasanthi at 8:00 a.m., Uchikalam at 10:00 a.m., Sayarakshai at 6:00 p.m., Irandamkalam at 8:00 p.m. and Ardha Jamam at 10:00 p.m. Each ritual comprises four steps: abhisheka (sacred bath), alangaram (decoration), neivethanam (food offering) and deepa aradanai (waving of lamps) for Naganathaswamy. The worship is held amidst music with nagaswaram (pipe instrument) and tavil (percussion instrument), religious instructions in the Vedas read by priests and prostration by worshippers in front of the temple mast. There are weekly rituals like somavaram and sukravaram, fortnightly rituals like pradosham and monthly festivals like amavasai (new moon day), kiruthigai, pournami (full moon day) and sathurthi. Mahasivarathri, Margazhi Thiruvadirai, Panguni Uthiram and Vasuki Utsavam during Panguni are the major festivals celebrated in the temple. The temple is famous for the conduct of Annaprasanam ritual, first feeding of rice to infant children. Rahu and Ketu transition is celebrated every 2.5 years in the temple during planetary transition.
