= Apputhi Adigal =

Nayanar saint

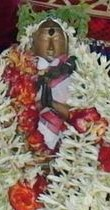

Personal life
- Born: 7th century CE Thingalur
- Honors: Nayanar saint,

Religious life
- Religion: Hinduism
- Philosophy: Shaivism, Bhakti

Apputhi Adigal, also spelt as Apputhi Adikal, Atputhi Adigal, Apputi Adigal, Appoodi Adikal, Appoothi Adikal and Appudhi Adigal and known as Appuddi Nayanar, was a Nayanar saint, venerated in the Hindu sect of Shaivism. He is generally counted as the twenty-fifth in the list of 63 Nayanars. He is described as a contemporary of Appar or Thirunavukkarasar (first half of the 7th century CE), one of the most prominent Nayanars.

== Life ==
The life of Apputhi Adigal is described in the Tamil Periya Puranam by Sekkizhar (12th century), which is a hagiography of the 63 Nayanars. He was a contemporary of Appar.

Apputhi Adigal was born in the village of Thingalur, Chola kingdom. Presently in the Thanjavur district, in the Indian state of Tamil Nadu, the village is famous for its Kailasanthar Temple dedicated to Shiva, the patron god of Shaivism. Apputhi Adigal belonged to Brahmin caste. His family had the job of reciting the Vedic scriptures. He was a staunch devotee of Shiva and a follower of Appar, who he regarded as his guru even though he has ever met Appar. He named his sons, cows and everything else in his house "Tirunavukkarasu", after Appar (Thirunavukkarasar). He worshipped Appar and erected rest-houses and water-sheds and dug ponds for devotees of Shiva and named them after Appar.

Once, while Appar decided to close-by Shiva temples after worshipping in the Shiva temple at Thirupuvanam and arrived at Thingalur. Thirsty, he went to a water-shed and saw his own name "Thirunavukkarasar", written all over the place. Upon enquiry, fellow pilgrims informed him that it was the word of Apputhi Adigal.

Appar went to the home of Apputhi Adigal and was welcomed by his host as a devotee of Shiva. Before Apputhi Adigal bowed to Appar, Appar prostrated before him. The guest asked Apputhi Adigal the reason why he did not name the water-shed after himself, but the name of somebody else. Apputhi was annoyed by the "causal reference" of the name of his guru. He shouted at the guest and asked if he did not know the greatness of Appar and sang his guru's glories. Finally, he asked the guest his identity. The humble guest indicated that he was the devotee who wrongly converted to another religion, but returned to Shaivism, after being cured by Shiva of colic. Apputhi realized by the description that his guest was his guru Appar.

Apputhi Adigal fell at his guru's feet and worshipped him. He washed Appar's feet with his family and sprinkled the "holy" water on him and his kin. He requested Appar to have lunch at the house; Appar consented. While Apputhi's wife cooked various delicacies, the eldest son (called "eldest Tirunavukkarasu") rushed to the garden to bring a banana leaf (traditionally lunch is served on a banana leaf in Tamil Nadu) for the guest. A snake bit him in the garden. The boy rushed with the banana leaf to the house before the poison took effect so as to not delay the feast. On handling the leaf to his parents, he collapsed. The parents realised their son had died due to the venom.

Not to delay the lunch of his guru, Apputhi and his wife hid the corpse and served Appar. Before the lunch, Appar blessed the family and wanted to present sacred ash to the family. He called the eldest son to receive it; Apputhi said he would not be available without mentioning the son's death. Finally, upon further enquiry, Apputhi revealed the truth to Appar. Appalled, Appar prayed to Shiva with the hymn Ondru Kolam thevaram. The child was resurrected. While the village cheered, the disappointed parents apologized to Appar for delaying his food. Appar had the meal with Apputhi and his children. Appar also resided at Apputhi Adigal's home for a few days, before returning to Thirupuvanam. At Thirupuvanam, Appar composed a hymn in honour of his host. Apputhi Adigal is said to have earned the grace of Shiva by serving Appar. The Periya Puranam also praises the devotion of the entire family.

== Remembrance ==
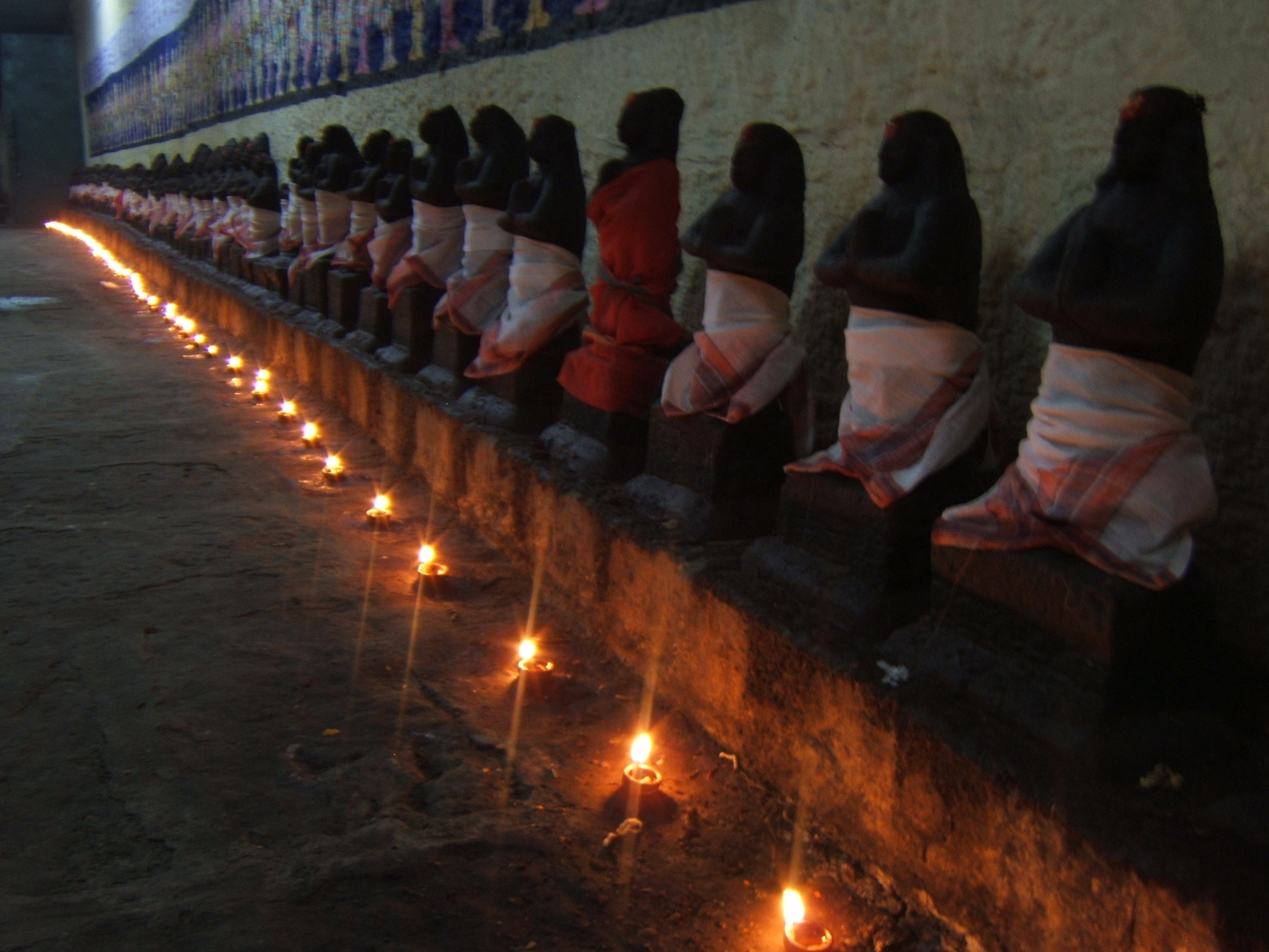
The images of the Nayanars are found in many Shiva temples in Tamil Nadu.

One of the most prominent Nayanars, Sundarar (8th century) venerates Apputhi Adigal in the Tiruthonda Thogai, a hymn to Nayanar saints, praises him as "princely Apputi". Appar has praised Apputhi Adigal in a hymn, composed at Thirupuvanam.

Images of Apputhi Adigal and his family are worshipped in the Kailasanathar Temple in his native village Thingalur.

Apputhi Adigal is worshipped in the Tamil month of Thai, when the moon enters the Shatabhisha nakshatra (lunar mansion). He is depicted with a shaved head and folded hands (see Anjali mudra). He receives collective worship as part of the 63 Nayanars. Their icons and brief accounts of his deeds are found in many Shiva temples in Tamil Nadu. Their images are taken out in procession in festivals.
