= Nadi astrology =

Astrology taken from ancient nadi leaves

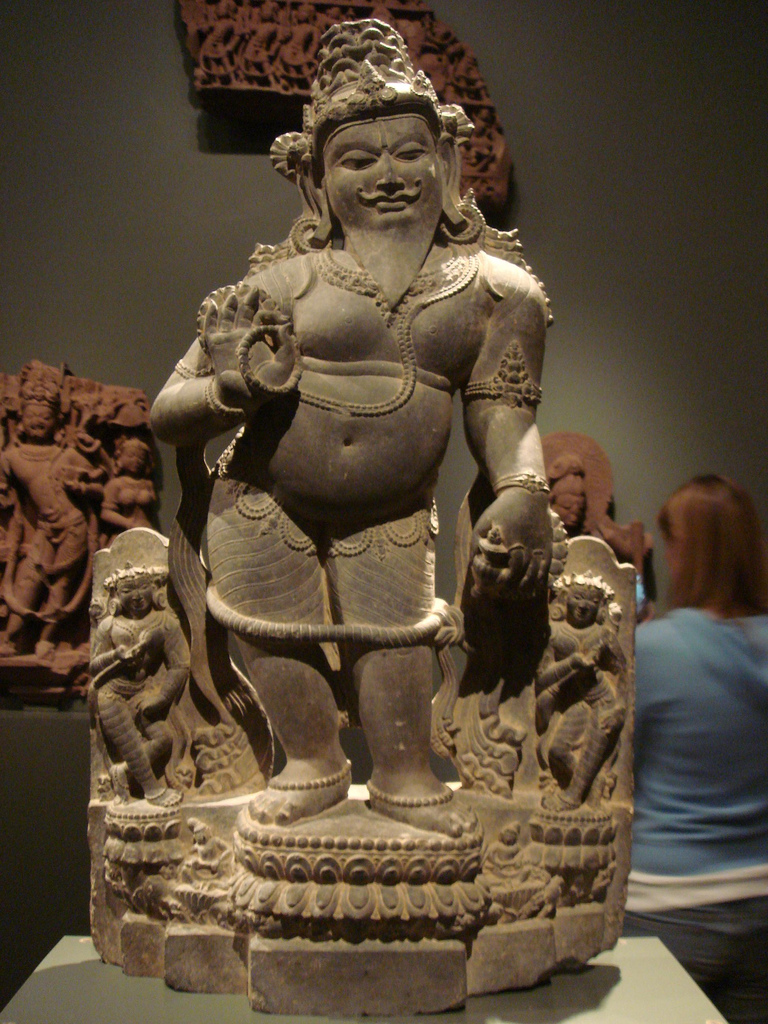
The origin of Nāḍi Jyotiṣa is often attributed to the Vedic sage Agastya

Nādi Astrology (nāḍi jyotiṣa) is a form of astrology practiced in Tamil Nadu and adjacent regions in India, chiefly in the erstwhile Tanjore country. It is based on the belief that the present lives of many humans were foreseen by Hindu sages in ancient times.

== History ==
In Tamil Nadu, the texts are mainly written in Vatteluttu, which was an abugida script used to write Tamil up until the 12th century CE. The content of the manuscripts is often attributed to the Vedic sage Agastya who is believed to have possessed a highly developed consciousness. These ancient records of providence were made famous by practitioners around the Vaitheeshwaran Temple in the state of Tamil Nadu. First, the Nadi palm leaves are located based on thumb impressions (right for men, left for women).

These Nadi leaves were initially stored on the premises of Thanjavur's Saraswati Mahal Library in Tamil Nadu. The British colonialists later showed interest in the Nadi leaves concerned with herbs and medicine, future prediction, etc. Some leaves got destroyed, and the remaining were auctioned during the British Raj (rule). These Nadi leaves were obtained by the families of astrologers at the Vaitheeswaran Temple and have been passed down the years from one generation to the other.

This entire science is kept as the deepest and the darkest secret. These secrets are often kept to the specific community i.e. the Valluvars and Vanniyars. The people belonging to other communities cannot know these secrets.

There is also another set of astrologers claiming that the content written on the palm leaf is the conversation between Shiva and Parvathi. This is called "Shiva nadi jyotisiyam".

== Theory ==
The basic concept of Nadi Astrology is "Nadi" (nāḍi). There are 150 Nādis in a sign or Rāshi (Rāsi); one sign is 30 degrees of the zodiac 360. Twelve signs of the zodiac are grouped into three categories: Moveable (Chara), Fixed (Sthira), and Dual (Dvisvabhāva) signs. The nomenclature of 150 Nādis is peculiar to each of these three types of signs. There are 1,800 Nādis in 360 degrees. The numbers and names of Nādis are identical among all four Chara signs. Among all four Sthira signs, the numbers and names of Nādis are identical, but the numbering is different from those in Chara and Dvisvabhāva signs. Similarly, the numbering of Nādis in all four Dvisvabhāva signs is identical among themselves but different from Chara or Sthira signs. For instance, the first Nādi in Chara signs such as Aries is Vasudhā Nādi, but in Sthira signs the order is reversed and Vasudhā is 150th Nādi. In Dvisvabhāva signs such as Gemini, Vasudhā is 76th Nādi; that is, from the middle of 150. Thus, there are 450 distinctive names and numbers in the full zodiac. Nādi texts use this concept of Nādi as the basic unit for prediction. That is why they are called "Nādi amshas".

Chandra Kalā Nadi, which is also known as Deva Keralam, was published by Sagar Publications in 1992, edited, and translated into English by R Santhanam. It is a compilation of over 82 hundred verses by Achyut of Kerala. That is why it is called "Deva Keralam". But its original kernel was Chandra Kalā Nādi, which has not been preserved as a separate text. Deva Keralam has borrowed many non-Nādi concepts also to make the book fuller, but it preserves the gist of Nādi astrology. However, there are many different trends in Nādi Astrology that are not present in Deva Keralam. There are Nādi texts named after planets, such as Guru Nādi or Shukra Nādi, and there are voluminous unpublished texts like Dhruva Nādi. The palm leaves in Tamil Nādu temples use a style different from that of Deva Keralam, and the Tamil method of Nādi Astrology is paralleled by Bhrigu Samhitā in north India, which has been published in part, but many spurious publications in the name of Bhrigu Samhitā have also appeared in the market.

The basic methodology of these Nādi or Samhitā texts has never been described in these texts, hence astrologers can predict only what they already possess, and are dumbfounded when they do not possess the required leaf about some particular person. The most fundamental trait of Nādi texts is Nādi, which is a sum total of all divisions of a sign caused by sixteen divisional charts (shodasha Vargas) described in texts like BPHS (Brihat Parāshara Horā Shāstra). 135 divisions out of a total of 285 are repeated in other divisions; hence there are exactly 150 distinctive divisions of a sign. But these divisions are unequal; largest division being of half a degree, and the smallest division is 36th part of a degree. Another school of thought assumes that all 150 divisions are equal; the value being 12 minutes (arc) in length.

When predictions are based on Nādis in which ascendant and planets are placed; it means the combined results of all sixteen divisional charts are being told. Hence, Nādi Astrology is the most detailed and accurate method. But it requires highly precise birth time, and it also requires knowledge of genuine Nādi texts, most of which are unpublished, and the custodians do not allow others to see the manuscripts. The same is the case with Samhitā texts in north India, such as Bhrigu Samhitā or Rāvana Samhitā.

== Beliefs ==
=== Atma ===
Atma is the 'real' self with no body, no mind or no desire. Atma is immortal, and characterises the real self. Changes apply only to the physical bodies. Common stages are birth, childhood, teenage, adulthood, old age, and death. The real self (the Atma) then enters into a different body depending on one's Karma and takes form relative to the good or bad deeds one has done. Atma can neither be created nor destroyed. Atma manifests in a physical body as per applicable karmas.

In Karmic terms, a transition like this is like a person working in an organisation getting promoted when he or she works sincerely, honestly and efficiently, or demoted if he or she is a bad worker.

Nadi Astrology is like a mirror of one's karmas in the previous birth(s). While this is not entirely accurate, for simplicity's sake, consider two options associated with one's Karma. One either lives out one's mistakes or one can overcome them by performing corrective actions in a proactive manner – this goes for all living beings.

=== Navagrahas and siddars ===
All beings, irrespective of species, nationality, religion, social class, aggressiveness, etc., are controlled by the Navagrahas (nine planets). The Navagrahas are very sincere in their duties as cosmic public servants and never deviate in performing their duties. They cannot be bribed. They affect individual beings as well as entire societies as per the Karma (thoughts, words and deeds of beings in this world as well as other worlds) applicable. The current life path of a person is determined by past Karma. For example, if a person is blessed with wealth in this birth, then it implies this person has done many punyas (activities that resulted in good Karma) in his/her previous births and he/she is enjoying the benefits of it in this birth. It is like a person who has saved a lot of punyas in his or her account cashing it in when the need arrives.

Birth, death, rebirth and moksha are all controlled by our karma. Paapams (activities that result in negative Karma) are obstacles that may take long to dilute whereas punyas earned can be 'spent' very soon. From the Hindu point of view, this makes it important that one always thinks good thoughts and does no harm to any other being. Bad Karma is committed even if one thinks unrighteous thoughts.

What is to be given to one's lot in life, when, how and where are all decided by the Brahma using the Navagarahas and the Siddars as channels. As the Brahma cannot do everything in our realm directly, 84,000 Siddars have been created to perform duties on its behalf. Siddars are only another level of public servants in the cosmos, and they have capabilities and energies many would consider supernatural, although in Hinduism this is quite normal. Of all the siddars, 84,000 are identified as very powerful and these siddars express themselves by way of Nadi. Agathiyar is the leader of all Siddars – Agathiyar along with Kakapujandar, Bokar. Agathiyar always thrived for Jeeva Karunyam (to not harm any being), i.e., taking care of all living things in this world and guiding them to the path of Gnana or the attaining of supreme self-knowledge.

=== Types ===
- Nadi talks about a person's past, present and future and is mostly concerned with material things like getting a job, construction of house, marriage, curing a disease, and so on. Gaanda Nadi were already written by Siddars ages back and are available in Tamil Nadu with blessed people.
- Jeeva Nadi is like a live thing happening. It is mainly concerned with Gnana (knowledge) and Nakshatra, the study of the lunar mansions and constellations for timing.

== Nadi astrology in popular culture ==
Prince of Malacca

In the film Chandran Rutnam is set to direct, Prince of Malacca, the olai-chuvadi (palm-leaf) reading which Raj Rajaratnam sought to forecast his future is influenced.

After Johny reads an article in the Newsweek magazine by a professor at the University of New York, he becomes interested in olai-chuvadi reading or Nadi astrology. The article reveals, "Rajaratnam had gone to the ola-leaf readers." It is said there was a government case against Raj, that he was in the stock business, that he was famous worldwide, that he had to close his business down. Rajaratnam revealed in the article that he doesn't generally believe in fortunetellers and astrologers. "But the ola leaves were written thousands of years ago. In those days there was no share business. I found it interesting." The leaf reader had also divined that his wife was born in "some southeast Asian country." His wife Asha was born in the Philippines.

Chidhambara Ragasiyam

In the Tamil language TV show Chidhambara Ragasiyam revolved around the Nadi olai-chuvadis (palm-leaves) of 12 people in which the cure of AIDS was written as 12 parts.

There is also a note/belief that has been shared in the series, that the Nadi palm leaves originated from Chidambaram and then moved to Tanjavur, from where it move to Vaitheeswaran Koil.

'The Detective is Already Dead'

In the second volume of the Japanese light novel series The Detective Is Already Dead, a direct reference is made by two characters – the protagonist, Kimihiko Kimizuka, and Hel – to Nadi astrology and its purported future-telling abilities.

Chandrettan Evideya In the Malayalam movie Chandrettan Evideya starring Dileep. One day the protagonist and his family decide to go for a trip to Thanjavur where they meet a Nadi Astrologer who tells them the love story of the protagonist's previous life which took place 1000 years ago.

== Bibliography ==
- Shashikant Oak, Nadi Predictions A Mind Boggling Miracle (2010), ISBN 81-7182-948-1
- Sanjay Rath, Collected Papers in Vedic Astrology (2006), ISBN 0-9765177-1-X, chapter 9, pp. 247–276.
- Thomas Ritter, Die Palmblattbibliotheken und ihre Prophezeiungen zur Zukunft Europas (2006) ISBN 978-3-938516-20-1.
- Thomas Ritter, Die Geheimnisse indischer Palmblattbibliotheken Dem Schicksal auf der Spur: Dem Schicksal auf der Spur. Das Vermächtnis der Sieben Weisen. Schicksalsbibliotheken auf der Spur (2002) ISBN 978-3-89094-350-3.
