= Vaitheeswaran Koil =

Navagraha temple in Tamil Nadu

- Vaitheeswaran Kovil (Pullirukuvelur)
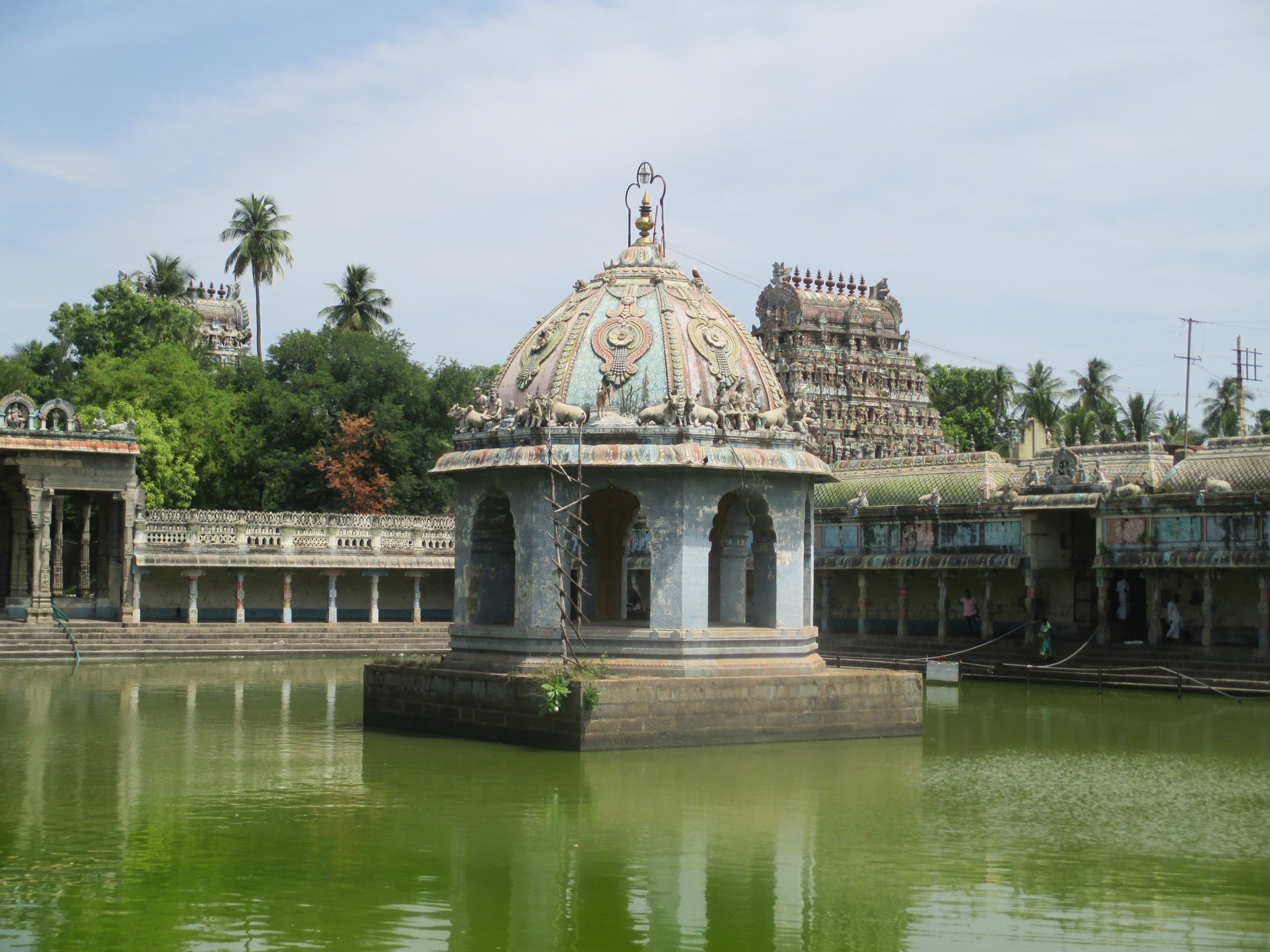

- Location in Tamil Nadu

Religion
- Affiliation: Hinduism
- District: Mayiladuthurai
- Deity: Vaidyanatha Swamy Thayyal Nayagi Selvamuthukumarasamy Shree Vinayakar, Angarakan (Mars) Dhanvantari Siddhar Jeeva Samadhi
- Features: Tower: 4; Temple tank: Siddha Amritam

Location
- Location: Vaitheeswarankoil
- State: Tamil Nadu
- Country: India
- Coordinates: 11°11′42″N 79°42′51″E

Architecture
- Type: Dravidian architecture
- Temple: 1

Vaitheeswaran Koil is a Hindu temple dedicated to the Shiva, located in a small town Vaitheeswarankoil near Mayiladuthurai, Mayiladuthurai district the Indian state of Tamil Nadu. Shiva is worshipped as Vaidyanathar or Vaitheeswaran meaning the "God of healing" and it is believed that prayers to Vaitheeswaran can cure diseases. Vaitheeswaran is a Tamil derivative from vaidya (Doctor) and Ishvara (God/Master). The presiding deity is Sri vaidyanathan, facing towards West whereas East side is the common one. He is the God of Healing. When pronouncing in Tamil, it sounds like "vaideeswaran". It is one of the nine Navagraha (nine planets) temples and is associated with the planet Mars (Angaraka).

The village is also known for palm leaf astrology called Naadi astrology in Tamil. It is located 7 kilometers from Sirkazhi, 235 kilometers from Chennai, 27 km from Chidambaram, 110 km from Thanjavur and 13 km from Mayiladuthurai.

The holy waters of the Siddhamirtham tank within the temple complex contains nectar, and a holy dip is believed to cure all diseases.

The temple is revered by the Tevaram hymns of 7th-century Saiva nayanars - Tamil saint poets and is also classified as a Paadal Petra Sthalam (temple revered by the nayanars).

== Legend ==
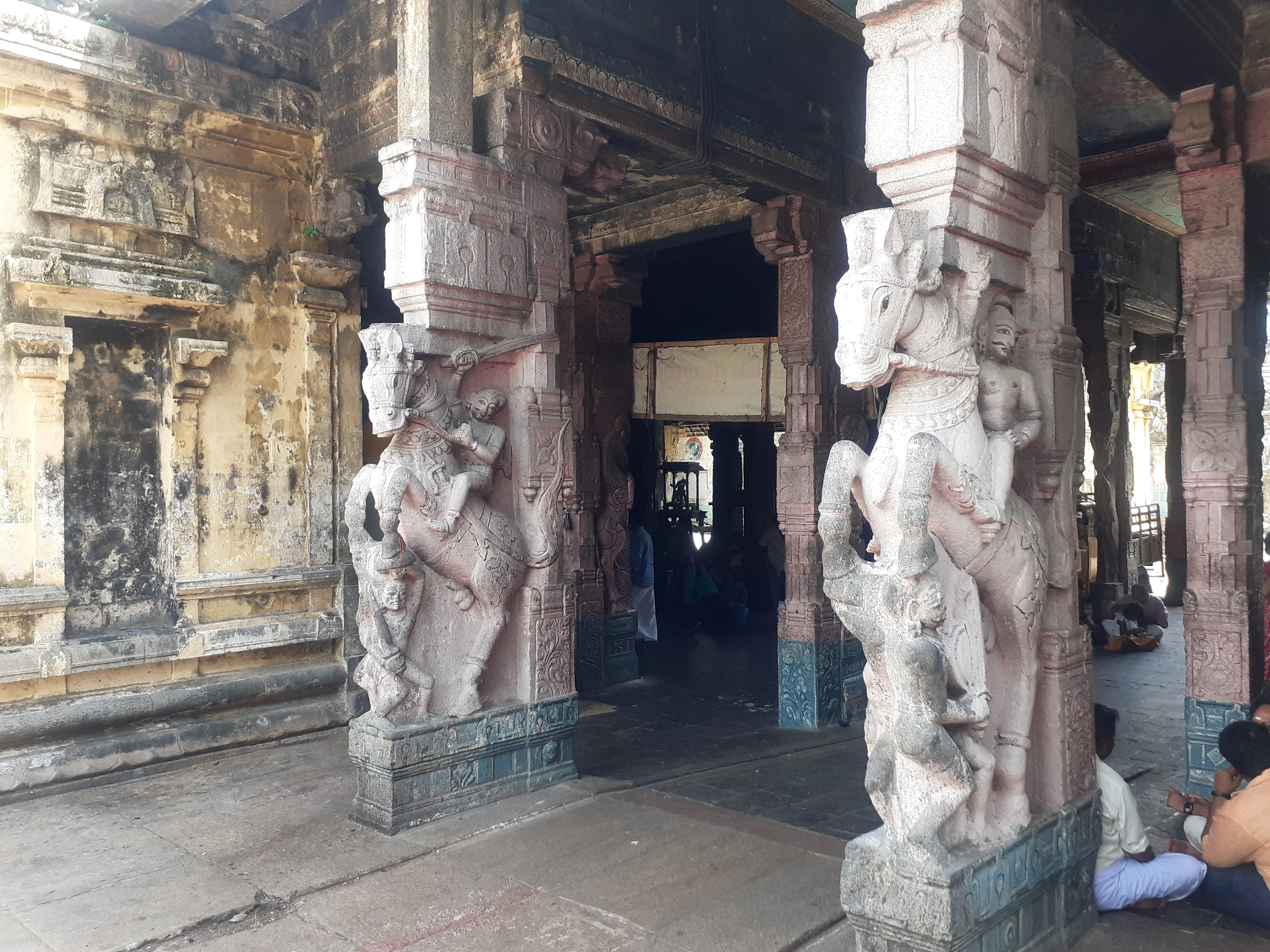
Pillars inside the temple

During the Ramayana period, Rama, Lakshmana and Saptarishi have worshipped the deity in this place. There is a pond at this temple called Jatayu kundam (pot of Jatayu having holy ash of Vibhuti). One of the nine planets, Angaraka (Mars), suffered from leprosy and was cured by Vaidhyanathaswamy and from then on it is treated as one of the Navagraha Temples for planet Angaraka. Parvati, the consort of Shiva, asked her son, Subramanya to appear with one face from his regular appearance of six faces. When he did so, she was pleased and presented him with vel (a weapon) to slay the demons. Subramanya overcame the asura Surapadman (a demon) and in the war, his army was severely injured. Shiva came out as the healer Vaitheeswaran and cured the wounds. As per another legend, Shiva came as Vaidya, a doctor, and cured the leprosy of a staunch devotee named Angahara. Jatayu, Muruga and Surya were all believed to have worshipped Shiva here. Murugan obtained a Vel trident at this place and is called Selvamuthu Kumaran. As per popular legend, 'Pul' (Jatayu), 'Irukku' (Irukkuvedam)', 'Vel' (representing Muruga) and 'Ooor' (place) worshipped in the place and hence it came to be known as 'Pullirukavelur'.

== History ==
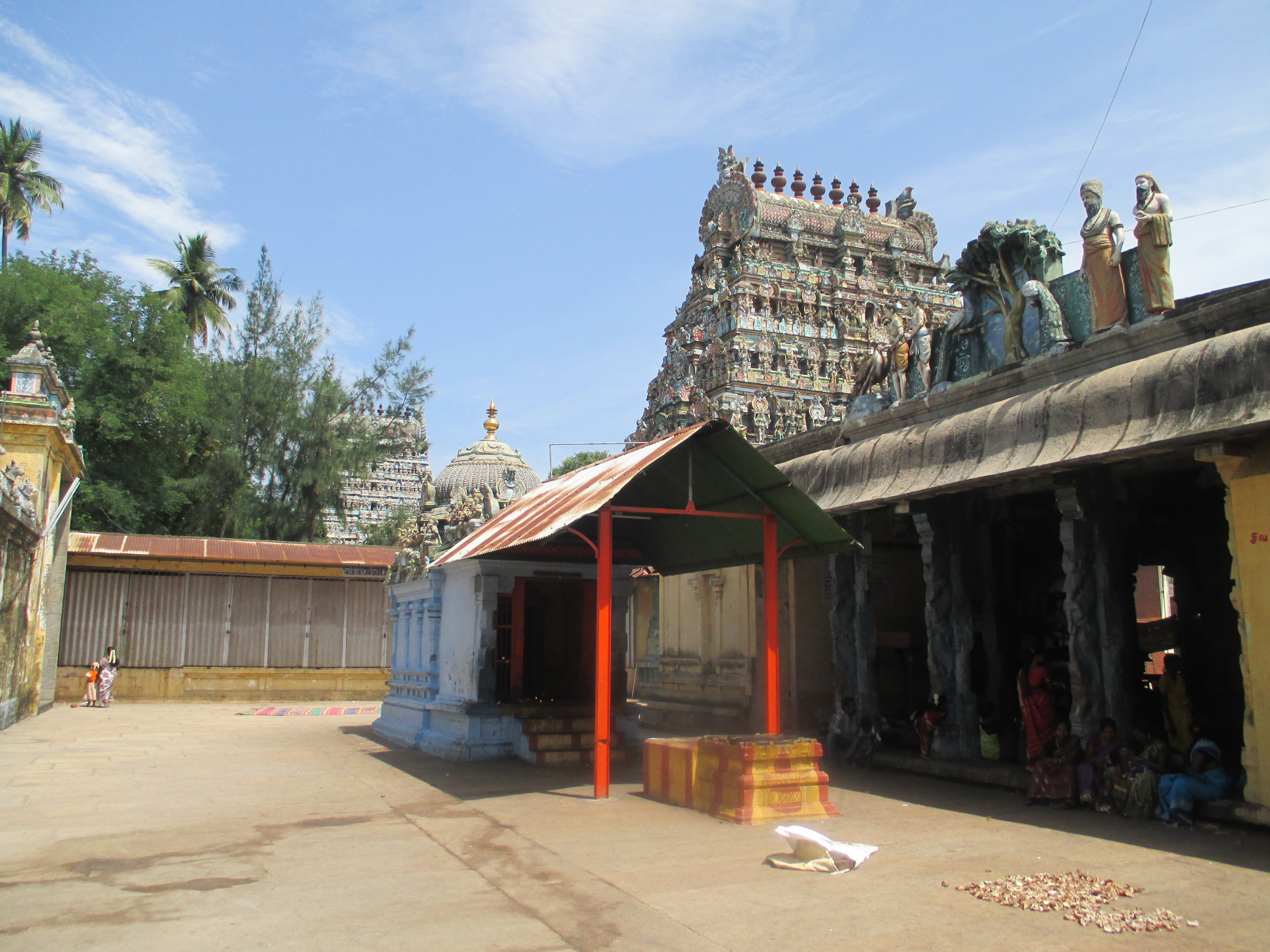
The shrine of Vinayagar near the temple tank

The temple received contributions from various rulers of the region like Vikrama Chola, Vira Rajendra Pandya, Achuthappa Nayak (1560 - 1614 AD) and Maratha prince Thulaja. The temple has five inscriptions mainly belonging to the period of Kulothunga Chola I (1070-1120 CE). The inscription on the steps of Subramanya shrine records the shutter of the sluice at Sattainathapuram measures 35 inches in length and 8 inches in breadth. The one on the right of the temple tank indicates the tank, Nachiyar shrine, and its hall were completely renovated when Kanderayar was governing the Sigali Simai, and during the management of the temple by Muthukumaraswami Tambiran, a disciple of Sivagnanadesikar-Sambandar of the Dharmapuram Adheenam. On the wall of the second precinct, the inscriptions state that the courtyard of Thayalnayagi shrine, the sacred steps and Tattisuri hall were built during Tamil year 4868 corresponding to 1689 CE. On the floor near accountant's seat registers a deed granted by Sankarabaragiri Rengopanditar by Ambalavanatambiran, an agent of the temple. The Easter gateway inscription indicates the gift of taxes from Manipallam in Tiruvalipparu. The temple is maintained by Dharmapuram Adheenam, a Saivite mutt or monastic institution located in the town of Mayiladuthurai, India. As of 1987, there were a total of 27 Shiva temples under the control of the adheenam.

== Architecture ==
Vaitheeswarankoil is located 13 km (8.1 mi) from Mayiladuthurai and 90 km (56 mi) from Thanjavur on the Thanjavur - Chidambaram highway. The temple is located between Sirkali to Mayiladuthurai State Highway. Frequent bus services are operated by Tamil Nadu government. There is a Railway station which is located between Chennai to Mayiladuthurai railway road. Karaikal is the nearest proposal airport located around 40 kilometer from temple. The temple has a five-tiered gopuram (temple tower), two inner gopurams and large precincts. The central shrine is that of Vaitheeswaran present as lingam in the inner most sanctum. The first precinct around the sanctum has the metal image of Subramanya, worshipped here as Muthukumara Swamy. The other metal images in the sanctum are of Nataraja, Somaskanda, Angaraka and stone sculptures of Durga, Dakshinamoorthy, Surya (Sun god), Jatayu, Sampati. The shrine of Thaiyalnayaki in the second precinct facing south houses the image of Thiyalnayagi sported in standing posture with the medicinal oil to cure the diseases. The large precinct also has a small shrine to Dhanvantari and shrine of Angaraka in stone sculpture. The southern gateway from this precinct leads to the temple tank and directly faces the Thaiyalnayaki shrine. The Sthala Vriksha (temple tree) is margosa (Azadirachta indica, neem tree), believed to possesses medicinal properties, is present near the eastern gateway. The eastern gateway also has the shrine of Adi (original) temple that has a smaller replica of the main shrines. There is a fine metal image of Gangavisarjanar inside the temple. The shrine of Angaragan (Mars) is present near the Eastern gateway in the third precinct.

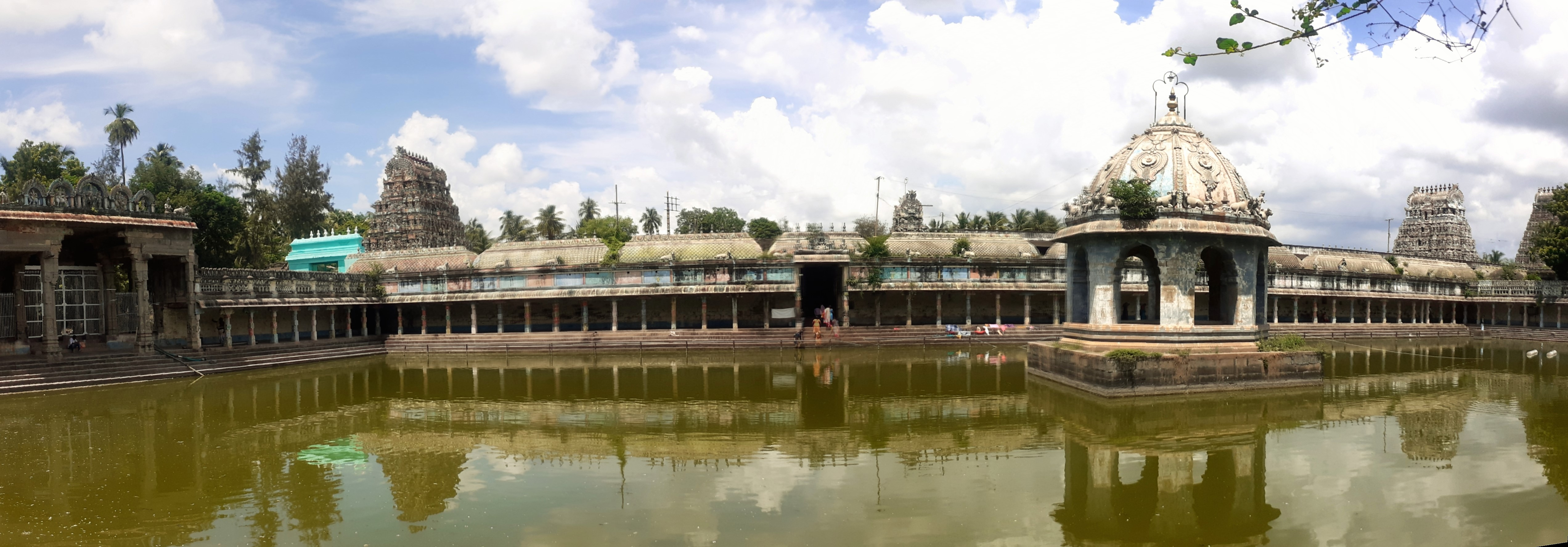
Panoramic view of the temple

== Worship and festivals ==
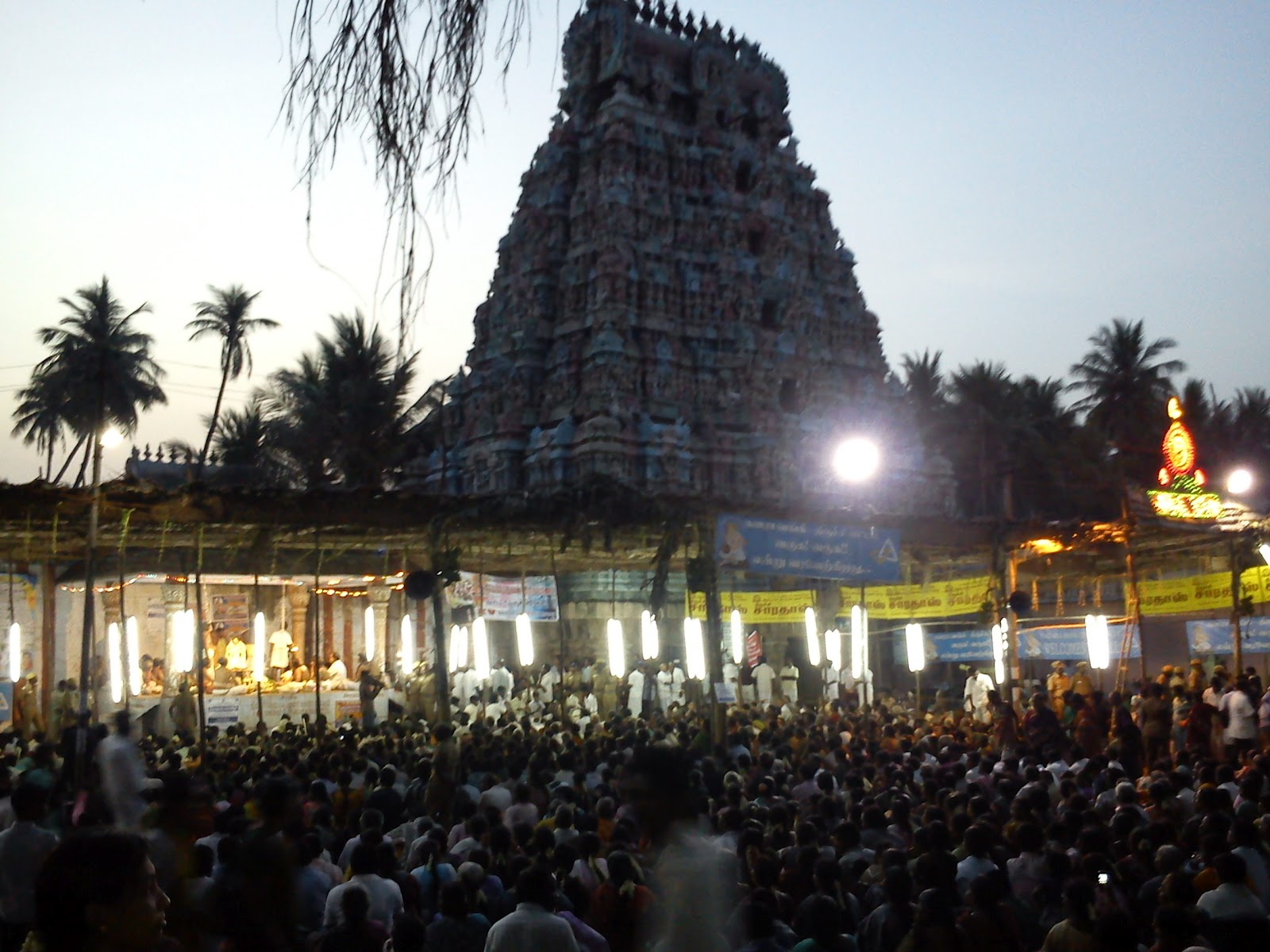
Thirukalyanam festival

Devotees take a holy dip in the temple tank before worshipping Vaitheeswaran in the temple. It is also a local belief that dissolving jaggery (Tamil:vellam) in the waters cures skin diseases. Tonsure ceremony of getting children shaved for the first time to promote proper growth is a very common practise. Mavilaku ma (lighting lamp in rice cakes) is a form of worship practised. The practise of jamming salt and pepper in front of the temple mast and the pot near the temple tank is also followed. Unlike other temples in South India, where each shrine has a priest, each priest in the temple associates themselves with the devotees and perform worship on their behalf. The holy soil rounded with ash (called Thiruchandu Urundai) is treated as medicine and believed to cure all the diseases. Another medicine given is chandan (sandalwood powder) with saffron. It is a practice to purchase silver-plated images of body parts to put in the Hundi (vessel for offering) to fix ailments one might be having. The Veeraraghavaswamy temple at Thiruvallur is considered the Vaishnavite temple equivalent of healing abilities of the presiding deity to that of the Saivite Vaitheeswaran Kovil. Brahmotsavam (annual festival) is celebrated during the Tamil calendar months of Pankuni and Thai (January–February). Karthigai festival during November is also celebrated with pomp and glory. Kantha Sashti, a festive occasion for Subramanya, is celebrated in the shrine of Muthukumaraswamy.

== Navagraha temple ==
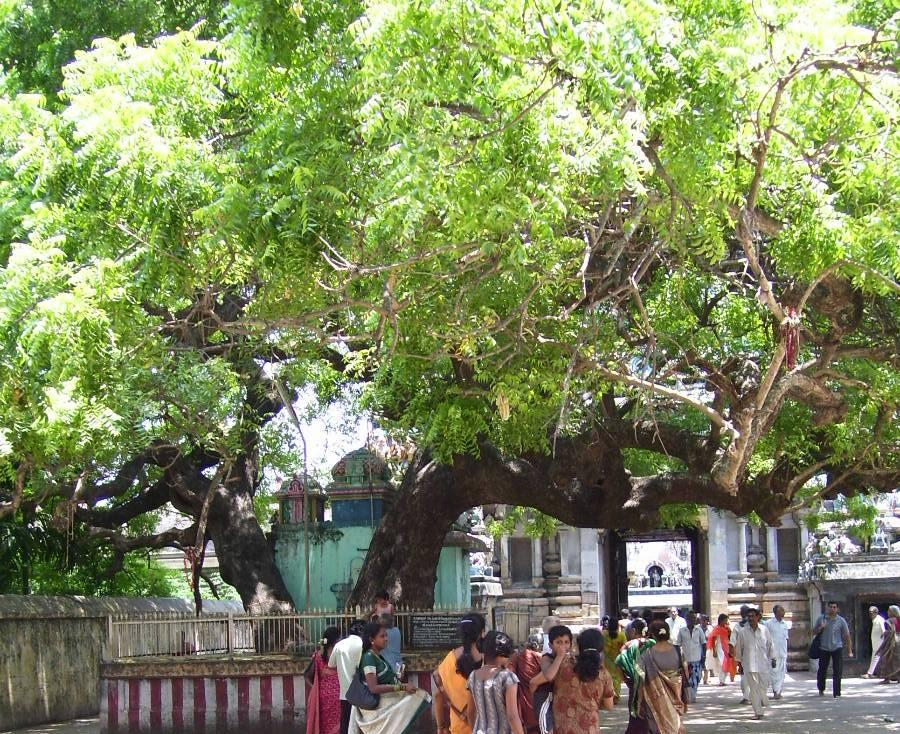
Eastern gateway with 'Adi' shrines and temple tree

The temple is one of the nine Navagraha temples of Tamil Nadu and is a part of the popular Navagraha pilgrimage in the state - it houses the image of Angaraka (Mars). The planets are believed to influence the horoscope computed based on time of one's birth and subsequently influence the course of life. Each of the planets are believed to move from a star to another during a predefined period and thus sway over an individual's fortunes. The Navagrahas, as per Hindu customs, are believed to provide both good and bad effects for any individual and the bad effects are mitigated by prayers. As in other Navagraha temples, the common worship practises of the devotees include offering of cloth, grains, flowers and jewels specific to the planet deity. Lighting a set of lamps is also commonly followed in the temple. As per local legend, Shiva was doing penance at mount Meru when a drop of water fell from his forehead which turned into a beautiful child. Bhoomidevi brought up the child, who went on to become a staunch devotee of Shiva. Pleased by the devotion, Shiva turned him to a planet. Based on his colour, Angaraka (Mars) is usually clad with red coloured cloth. Vaitheeswaran is believed to preside over Angarakan in the temple. Along with Angarakan, Sambathi, Jatayu and Surya deva are believed to have worshipped Vaitheeswaran at this temple.

== Nadi astrology ==
Nadi astrology ('நாடி ஜோதிடம்' in Tamil), (nāḍi jyotiṣa) is a form of Hindu astrology practiced around the temple. It is based on the belief that the past, present and the future lives of all humans were foreseen by Hindu sages in ancient time. The texts are mainly written in Vatteluttu, which is an ancient Tamil script. There are different schools of thought as to the author of these leaves. They are believed to be written by a Tamil sage called Agathiyar who is said to have had divine revelations. These Nadi leaves were initially stored in the premises of Tanjore Saraswati Mahal Library of Tamil Nadu. The British rulers later showed interest in the Nadi leaves concerned with herbs and medicine and future prediction, but left most of the leaves to their loyal people. Some leaves got destroyed and the remaining were auctioned during the British rule. These leaves were obtained and possessed by the families of astrologers in Vaitheeswaran temple and was passed down the years from one generation to the other.

== Religious importance ==
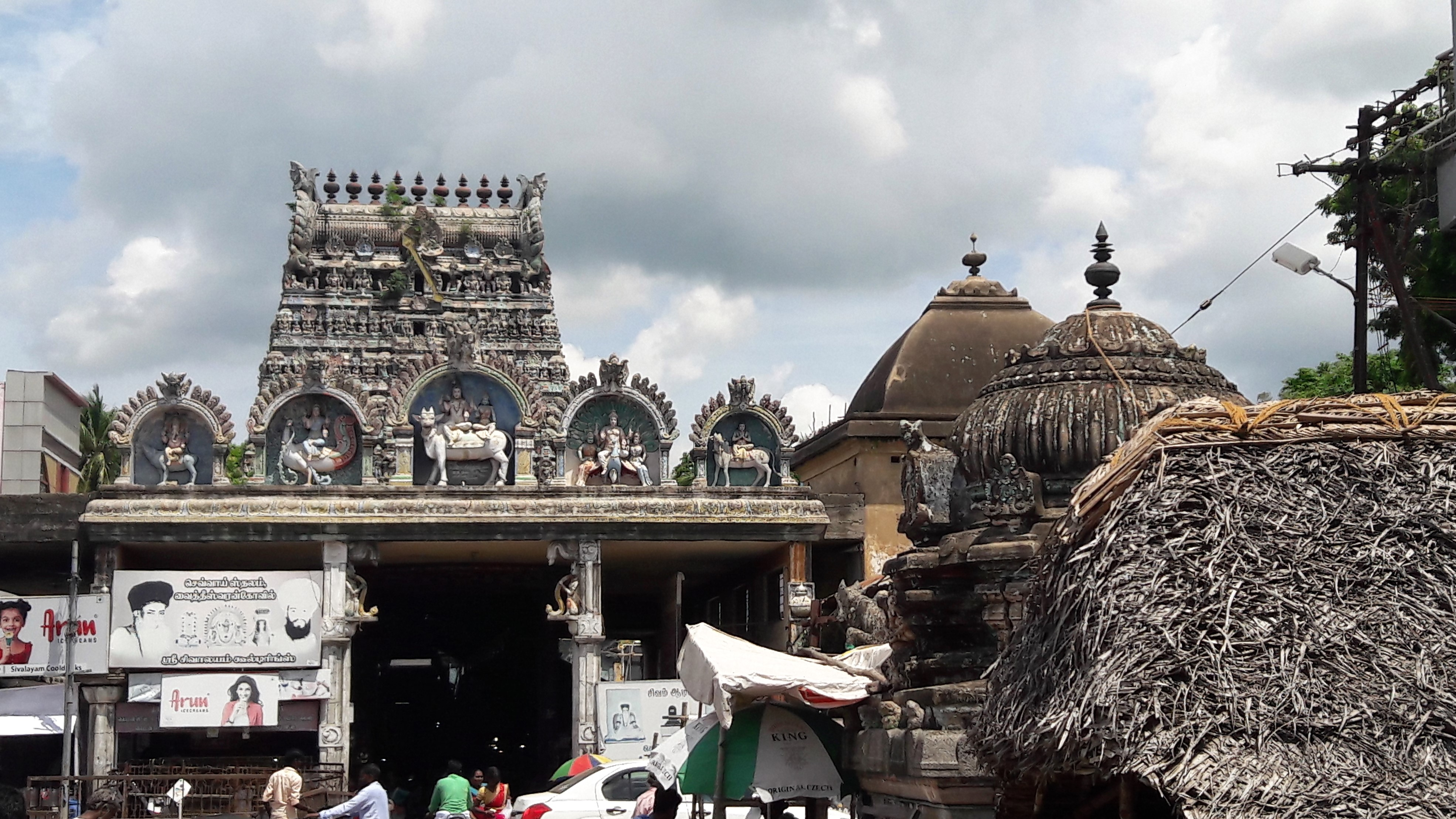
View of entrance of the temple

The temple is revered by Tevaram hymns of saint poets Thirunavukkarasar and sambandar belonging to the 7th century. The poets name the towns where they found the temple in their hymns and Pullirukkuvelur finds a mention in their verses, corresponding to the temple. The hymns appear to recognise the function of the mantras (sacred text) as invocation of Shiva. In addition the hymns from Thirunavukkarasar likens Shiva to luminous objects - a flame, a pearl, a diamond and pure gold. He also indicates wasting lot of days not worshipping Shiva at this temple.

"வெள்ளெ ருக்கர வம்விர வுஞ்சடைப்
புள்ளி ருக்குவே ளூரரன் பொற்கழல்
உள்ளிருக்கு முணர்ச்சியில் லாதவர்
நள்ளி ருப்பர் நரகக் குழியிலே."

translating to

Those who have no perception of the golden feet of deity in Puḷḷirukku Vēḷūr on whose matted hairs cobra and white yarcum flowers are mingled, staying in their minds. will be in the centre of the hollow of the hell.

Muthuswami Dikshitar has composed 6 Keerthanais on the devi of the temple as per an inscription at the temple.
