= Kanjanur =

- village
- Country: India
- State: Tamil Nadu
- District: Thanjavur

Languages
  - Official: Tamil
- Time zone: UTC+5:30 (IST)

Kanjanur is a village in the Thiruvidaimarudur taluk of Thanjavur district, Tamil Nadu, India. It is situated on the northern bank of the Kaveri River about 18 kilometres (11 miles) north-east of Kumbakonam. It is one of the nine Navagrahasthalas of the Cauvery Delta and is famous for its Agniswarar temple dedicated to Shukra (Venus). The temple is one of the "Navagraha temples" of the Cauvery Delta. To the north of Kanjanur, are a series of low hillocks 100 to 150 feet (30 to 46 metres) high. Magnesite deposits have discovered in these hills.
