= Nagore Naganathaswamy Temple =

Coordinates: 10.8207°N 79.8379°E

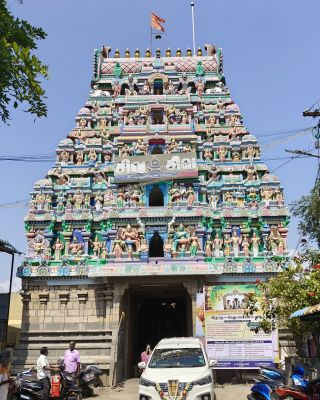
Rajagopuram

Nagore Naganathaswamy Temple is a Shiva temple located at Nagore in Nagapattinam district of Tamil Nadu, India.

== Presiding deity and consort ==
Naganathar is the presiding deity of the temple. As Nagaraja worshipped the presiding deity of the temple, He is known as Naganathar. His consort is known as Nagavalli. In the inner Prakaram, Rahu, one of the nine major celestial bodies (navagraha) in Hindu texts, is found with Nagavalli and Nagakanni, in a separate shrine. In this prakaram, shrines of Dakshinamurti, Nāgas, Valampuri Vinayaka, Muruga, Annamalayar, Chandikesa, Kasi Visvanathar are found.

== Festivals ==
Maha Shivaratri, Pradosha, Karthika Deepam and other festivals are celebrated in a grand manner.

== Speciality ==
During Vaishakha Purnima, the presiding deity appeared as Svayambhu Lingam under the temple tree punnai (Calophyllum inophyllum). It is said that snakes do not bite the people in this town. According to Sthala purana, Vasuki and other snakes went to Nageswaraswamy Temple, Tirunageswaram Naganathar Temple, Paampuranathar Temple, Thirupampuram and this temple in Nagore at a stretch and was bestowed with good deeds.

== Photo gallery ==
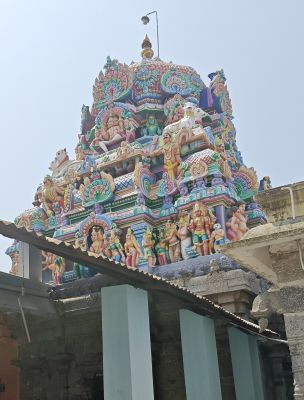
Shrine of the presiding deity

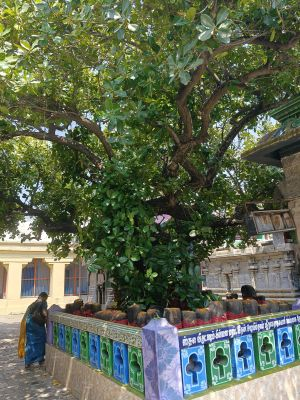
Temple tree

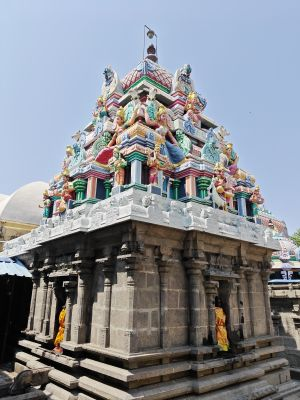
Shrine of the goddess

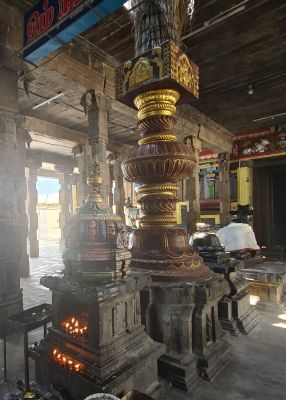
Nandhi and flagpost

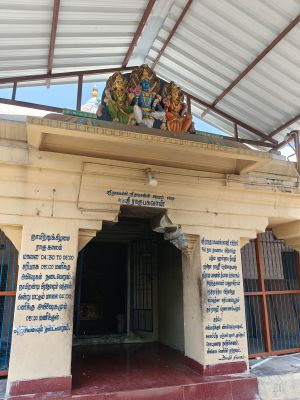
Shrine of Ragu

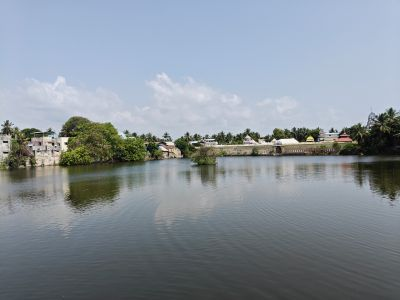
Temple tank
