= Oppiliappan Temple =

Vishnu temple in Thanjavur district, Tamil Nadu, India

- Thiruvinnagar
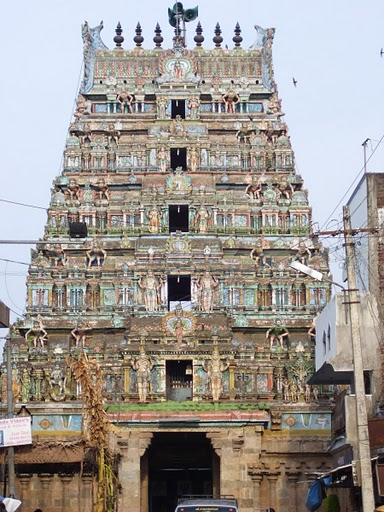
- The rajagopuram (gateway tower) of the temple

- Location in Tamil Nadu

Religion
- Affiliation: Hinduism
- District: Thanjavur
- Deity: Oppiliappan Perumal (Vishnu); Lakshmi as Bhudevi
- Festivals: Rama Navami, Vaikuntha Ekadasi, Sravanam Festival
- Features: Tower: Suddhananda Vimana; Temple tank: Ahoraathra Pushkarani

Location
- Location: Thirunageswaram
- State: Tamil Nadu
- Country: India
- Coordinates: 10°57′41.63″N 79°25′53.73″E

Architecture
- Type: Cholas

Website
- www.oppiliappanswamytemple.tnhrce.in, oppiliappan.org

Oppiliappan Temple, is a Hindu temple dedicated to Vishnu, located near Thirunageswaram and also known by its old toponym Thiruvinnagar, a village in the outskirts of the Kumbakonam in the South Indian state of Tamil Nadu. Constructed in the Dravidian style of architecture, the temple is glorified in the Naalayira Divya Prabandham, the early medieval Tamil canon of the Alvar saints from the 6th–9th centuries CE. It is counted as the 60th of the 108 Divya Desams dedicated to Vishnu. Vishnu is worshiped as Oppiliappan and his consort Lakshmi as Bhudevi.

The temple is one of the Pancha Kshethram, where Lakshmi was born as Bhargavi, the daughter of the sage Bhrigu.

The temple is believed to be of significant antiquity and to have been initiated by the Medieval Cholas of the late 8th century CE, with later contributions at different times from Thanjavur Nayaks. The temple has two inscriptions dating from the Chola period, a five-tiered rajagopuram (gateway tower), and a granite wall. The complex contains all the shrines and water bodies associated with it.

Oppiliappan is believed to have appeared for sage Markandeya and the Hindu deities Bhudevi, Brahma, and Shiva. The temple observes six daily rituals and three yearly festivals. The chariot festival, celebrated during the Tamil month of "Panguni" (March–April), is the most prominent. The temple is maintained and administered by the Hindu Religious and Charitable Endowments Department of the Government of Tamil Nadu.

== Legend ==
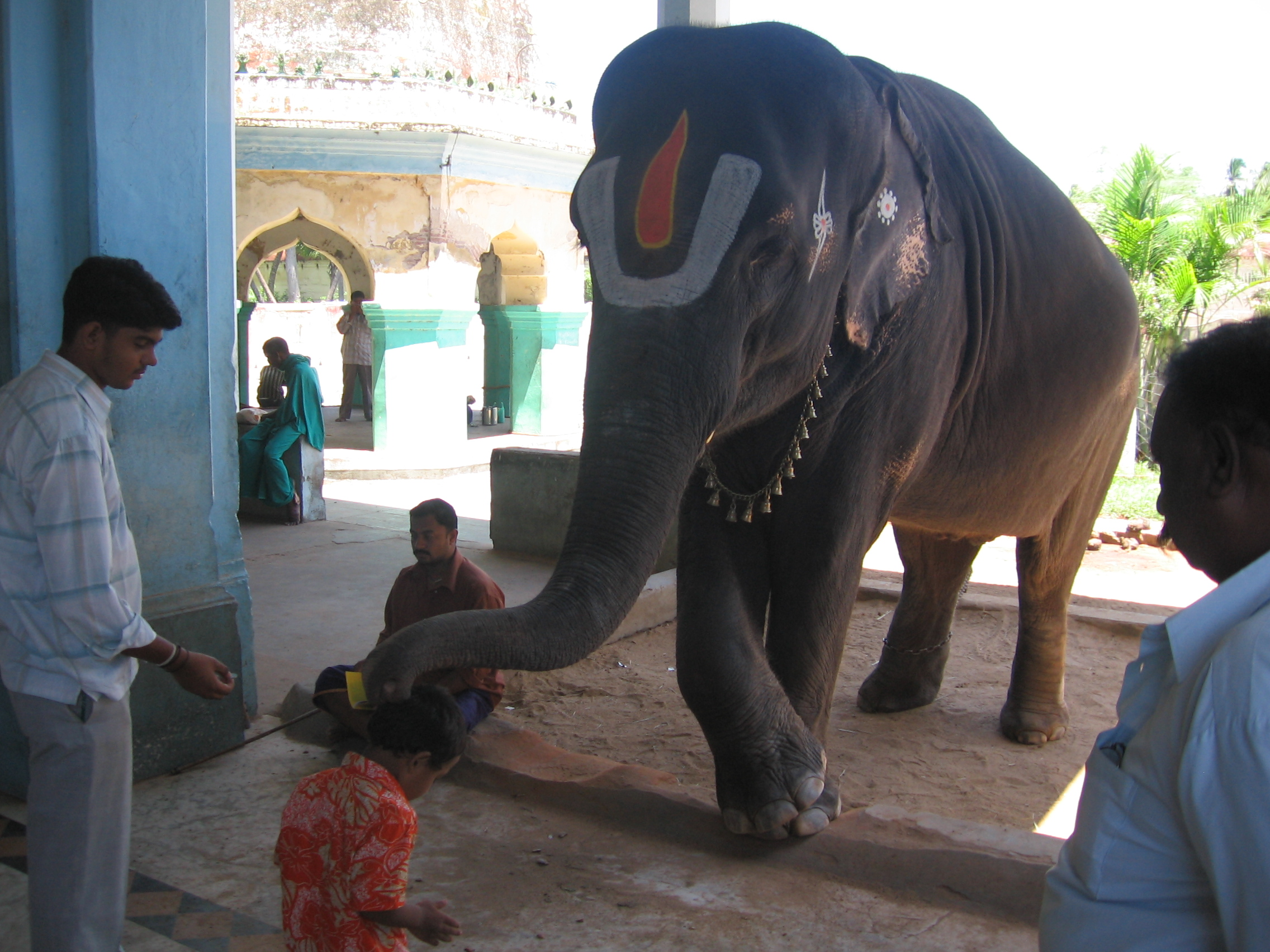
Temple elephant

The legend of the temple is mentioned in the Hindu scripture Brahmanda Purana. Tulasi, once did penance to attain closeness to the god Vishnu. Vishnu responded that his consort Lakshmi would appear under Tulasi's lap in Tiruvinnagaram. Tulasi appeared as a plant in the place where the temple is located. This is mentioned in the 53rd verse of Nammazhwaar in Thiruviruththam. The sage Markandeya worshipped Vishnu and desired to have Lakshmi as his daughter and Vishnu as his son-in-law. Once Markandeya was on a holy trip and after reaching Thiruvinnagaram, he felt it was the right place to get his desire fulfilled. Markandeya started a severe penance for thousand years, seeking Lakshmi's blessings. Lakshmi appeared as a baby under the tulasi plant. Markandeya recognized the baby as Lakshmi and raised her. When the young girl reached adolescence, on the panguni month of Shravana, Vishnu appeared as an old man and proposed marriage to her. Markandeya replied, "You are very ripe and old, my daughter is too young and she does not even know how to cook with proper salt contents", to which the old man replied, "If your daughter must cook without salt, then I will still take it as my best food, but I will not leave from here without marrying her". Markandeya sought Vishnu's help and then realised using his penance that the old man was Vishnu himself. When he opened his eyes, Vishnu appeared in his true celestial form. Markandeya married his daughter to Vishnu. Per the legend, the temple's Neyvethiyam (food offering) is always prepared without salt. The name Oppiliappan is a result of this legend.

There is also a story behind the tank in this temple. Once a King had consummated with a daughter of a saint and hence the saint cursed him to become a bird. The king lived as a bird and one night when there was a storm, the branch of the tree the bird was sleeping on broke and fell into the water of this tank. The bird regained its original form as the King and since then this is known as the only theerththam that one can do theerth thaadanam even in the night. Since this tank has such healing power in the day as well as night, it is called "Ahoraathra Pushkarani". The place is called by various names, including "Agasa Nagaram", "Vaikunda Nagaram", "Thiruvinnagar", "Oppiliappan Sannithi" and "Uppiliappan Sannithi". The presiding deity is also called by various names, including Venkatachalapathy, Thiruvinnagarappan, Oppilaappan, Thanoppillaappan, Uppiliappan and Srinivasan.

== History ==
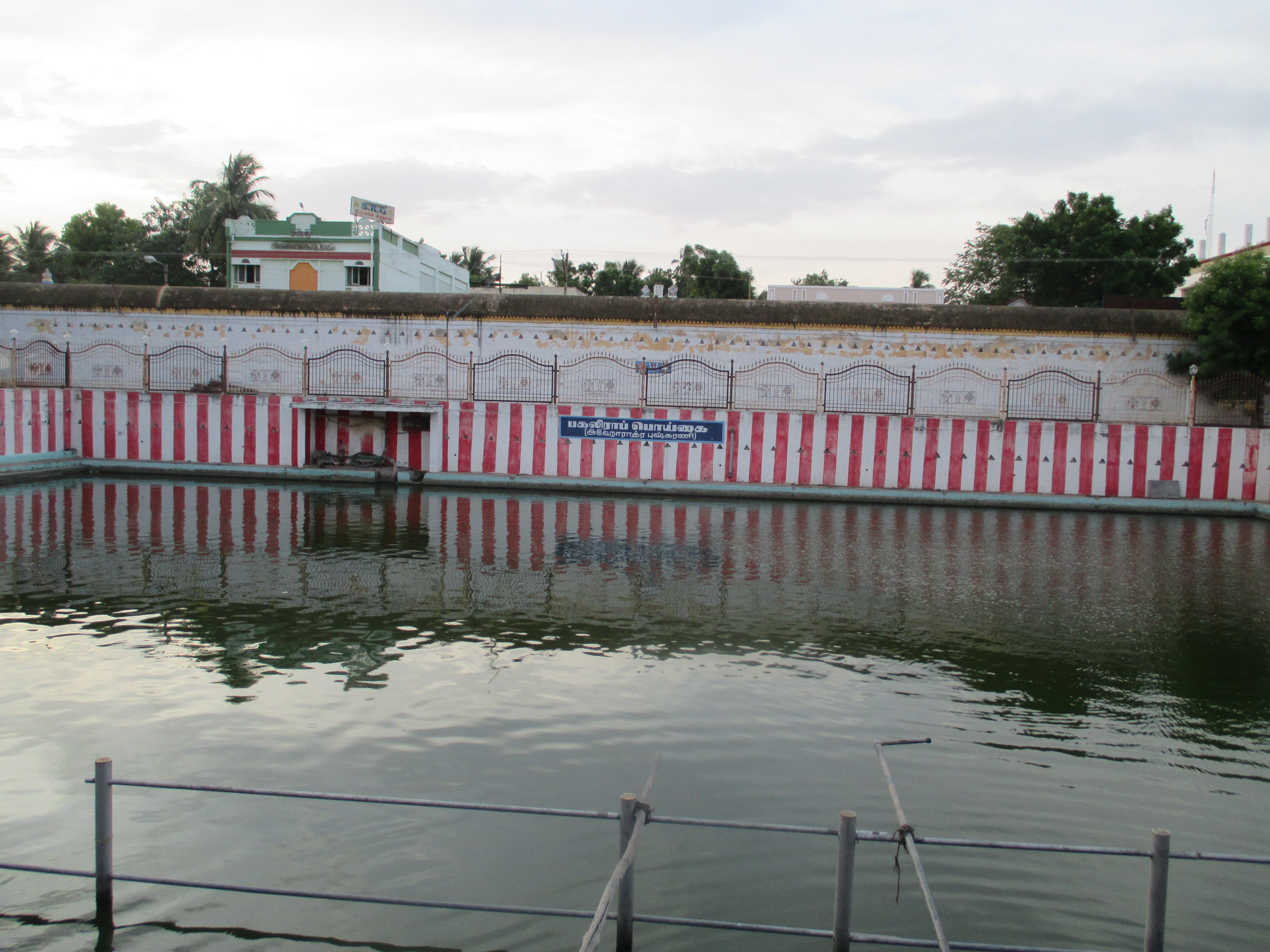
View of the temple tank

It is not clear from the inscriptions and records when the temple was initiated, but there are inscriptions from the Medieval Cholas period indicating generous gifts to the temple. There are two inscriptions recorded from the Naganathar Temple in Tirunageswaram. The epigraph numbered 211 of 1911 on the northern wall of the central shrine indicates gift of gold jewel worked in gems and pearls to the temple from the Chola king Parakesarivarman, alias Rajendra Chola I (1012–44 CE). The second inscription numbered 218 of 1911 on the shrine's southern wall indicates a gift of land to the temple in the 14th year of the Chola king Rajaraja Rajakkesarivarman I.

The tradition in many ancient temples in Tamil Nadu including this one is that the original image of the presiding deity is made of wood and replaced later with stone. There were a lot of additions made to the temple by Govinda Dikshitar, the minister of successive Nayak rulers, Achuthappa Nayak (1560–1614) and Raghunatha Nayak (1600–34). The temple is maintained and administered by the Hindu Religious and Endowment Board of the Government of Tamil Nadu.

== Architecture ==
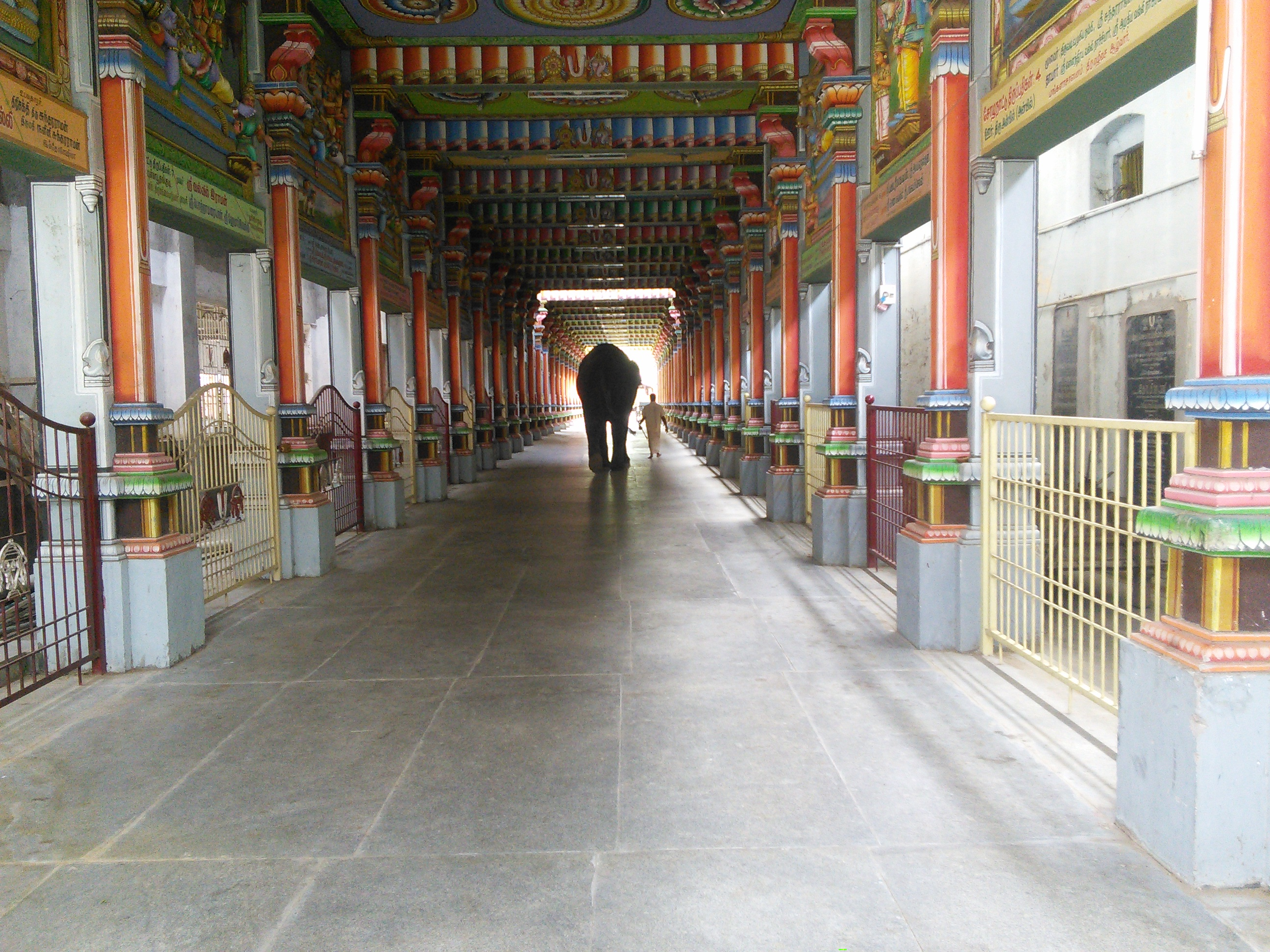
Elephant and mahout walking through the pillared hall.

The temple has a five-tiered rajagopuram (the gateway tower) and enshrined within a granite wall. The complex contains all the shrines and water bodies associated with it. The Sahasradhari plate and pot (kudam) are made of gold for performing Thirumanjanam (ablution) to the presiding deity. The temple also maintains golden sword, diamond crown and gold arm guard for the image of Hanuman. The shrine over the sanctum is plated with gold. The main shrine of the temple houses the image of Oppiliappan in standing posture and it also houses the images of Bhoomidevi and sage Markendeya. The vimana is called Suddhananda, meaning "pure happiness". The Desika shrine is located near the sancturn sanctorum. On the sides of the first precinct, the shrine of Anjaneya is located on the southern, and Alvars' and Rama's on the northern and Ramanuja's on the eastern sides. The shrine for Maniappan is located in the second precinct in the southern side, while the shrines of Ennappan and the holy birth spot of Bhoomidevi are located in the northern side. Garuda's shrine is located right opposite the sanctum and right behind the temple mast. The shrine of dancing Krishna is located on the southern side of the main entrance.

A marble hall is located on the western side in the inner precinct acts as the resting hall for the festival deities during festivals. Dolotsavam festival is celebrated in Another marble hall in the northern side of the temple. Adjoining the hall, there is a shrine where the images of Rama, Lakshmana, Sita and Hanuman are housed. The sacred bed chamber called Tiruppalliarai, covered full of mirrors is located next to it. A Yaga sala for performing religious rituals is present in the temple. The temple has a hall for housing festival vehicles, a library, and a hall with edight carved pillars on the banks of the temple tank, where the annual float-festival is celebrated. The Kodimandapa, located to the south of the Garuda shrine, is used for several day-to-day religious practices. The annual Kalyana Utsavam festival is performed in the hall amidst music and dance programmes.

The temple is considered the southern counterpart of Thirupathi temple and hence devotees perform their marriages and vows as they do in Thirupathi. Outside the main complex, the temple maintains two marriage halls, a rest house containing five rooms, two other halls, a housing each for the small chariot and the big chariot. There is a garden around the third precinct of the temple and a much bigger garden about 0.5 km (0.31 mi) to the south of the temple, where Tulasi and flowers are grown. A hall in the garden is used for resting deities during the Vasantotsavam festival celebrated for six days in May–June every year.

== Festivals and religious practices ==
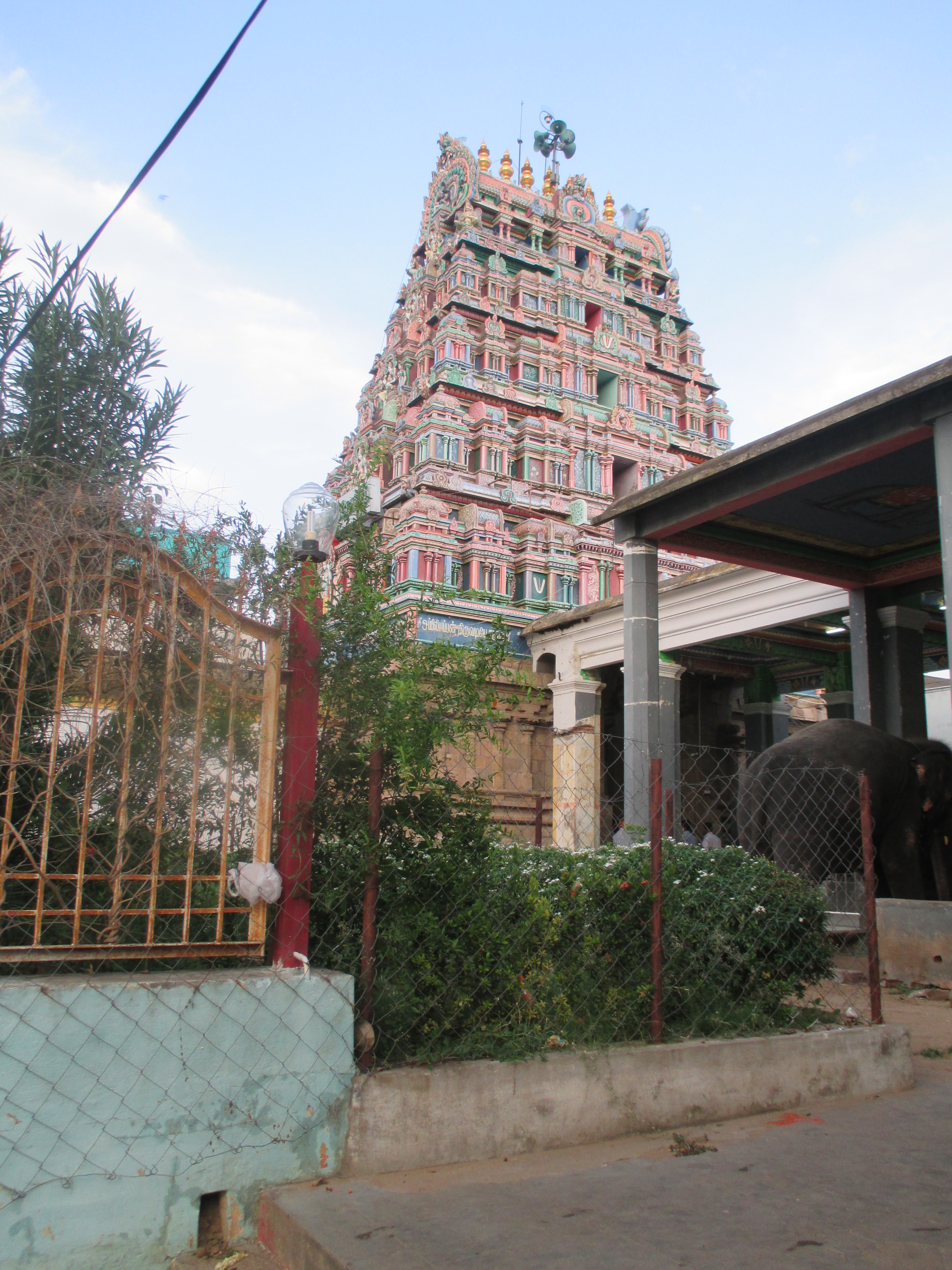
View of the shrine from the temple tank

The temple follows Vaigasana Agama and follows Vadagalai practices. During the Viswaroopa Seva, the first worship, Suprapada Prabarthi Mangalam, a verse exclusively dedicated to Oppiliappan is relayed. Thiruppavai is relayed after it, followed by naivethana in all shrines. Uchikalam is the last worship during the day time and happens at noon. During the evening, mutharkalam is the first worship sequence, recitals in Veda and Nithsuasandamam. Arthajamam is the last puja of the day.

The chariot festival is the most prominent festival of the temple, celebrated for nine days during the Tamil month of Panguni (March–April) and devotees from various places pull the chariot round the streets of temple. Verses from the 'Naalayira Divya Prabandham' are recited by a group of temple priests amidst music with Nagaswaram (pipe instrument) and Tavil (percussion instrument). The processional idols of Oppiliappan and Bhudevi are brought to the temple car early in the morning amidst Vedic chantings. Subsequently, the festive idols are taken to the 'ther thatti mandapam' (chariot launching hall). The 'ratharohanam', the rituals associated with taking the idols to the temple car is performed in an auspicious time before starting the procession. The temple celebrates six other festivals: Vasanta Utsavam (spring festival) for 6 days in the temple garden during Vaikasi (May–June), Pavitrotsavam (purifying festival) for 5 days during Avani (Aug – Sep), Brahmotsavam for nine days of Purattasi (Sept – Oct), Kalyana Utsavam (holy marriage of god and goddess) for 12 days commencing from Sravanam during Aippasi (Oct–Nov), Adhyayana Utsavam (ten-day-and-ten-night festival) during Margali (Dec–Jan) and float festival for 5 days during Thai(Jan – Feb). Ramanavami, the festival associated with Rama, an avatar of Vishnu. The event is celebrated for ten days with music and dance performance and on the concluding day, kanakabhishekam (ablution with gold for the festival image) and Rama Pattabhishekam. Sravan Deepam is a festival celebrated every month in the temple on the day of Tamil star of Thiruvonam and devotees observe fast called Sravana Vratham that day by consuming only unsalted food. Tonsure ceremony for getting children shaved for the first time to promote proper growth and ear piercing is a very common practise followed in the temple. It is believed that the place is as sacred as Vaikunta and as in Vaikunta, the river Vraja there flows as river Nattaru and hence considered sacred. The temple is counted as one of the temples built on the banks of River Kaveri.

== Literary mention ==
Oppiliappan is considered the elder brother of the presiding deity of Tirupathi Venkateshwara Temple. The temple is revered in Naalayira Divya Prabandham, the 7th–9th century Vaishnava canon, by Periyalvar, Thirumangai Alvar and Nammalvar. The temple is classified as a Divya Desam, the 108 Vishnu temples that are revered in the Vaishnava canon. The temple is counted as the 14th in the list of divyadesams in Chola Nadu and 83rd in the overall list. The Alvars address the presiding deity by various names like Oppiliappan, Vinnagarappan and Venkatachalapathy and his consort Bhudevi as Bhoomidevi Nachiar and Dharanadevi. Thirumangai Alvar refers to Oppiliappan as "Thiruvinnagar Mevvane" in his verses in Peria Tirumoli while Nammalvar called him "Thannoppaarillappan", that is, "he who has no comparison", meaning there is neither an equivalent nor superior to Vishnu. He mentions "the Lord who by his powers affords solace for pining hearts and renders them fit for service". The temple is one of the most visited in the district.
