= Velleswarar Temple, Mangadu =

Velleeswarar Temple, Mangadu
- Velleeswarar Temple, Mangadu, Tamil Nadu

Religion
- Affiliation: Hinduism
- District: Chennai
- Deity: Lord Velleeswarar

Location
- Location: Mangadu
- State: Tamil Nadu
- Country: India
- Interactive map of Velleeswarar Temple, Mangadu
- Coordinates: 13.028931°N 80.106766°E

Architecture
- Elevation: 42.02 m (138 ft)

Velleeswarar Temple is a Shiva temple located in Mangadu, a suburb of Chennai, India. This is a mid-size temple spread over 2 acres and is among the 3 principal temples in Mangadu – the other 2 being the Sri Kamakshi Amman Temple and Sri Vaikunda Perumal Temple. The temple is managed by the HRCE Department of the Government of Tamil Nadu. It is situated about 2 kilometers from Sri Kamakshi Amman Temple in Mangadu.

== Mythology ==
The temple is dedicated to Lord Shiva and derives its name from being worshiped here by Sukra (Vellee in Thamizh) - the planet Venus as per Hindu mythology. Lord Sukra is the guru of the Asuras. Special poojas are hence offered by devotees on Fridays - the day dedicated to Venus. This temple forms part of the Navagraha temples around Chennai. Devotees offer white field beans (Mochai) as a special offering signifying the cereal in relation to Sri Sukra.

According to the legend, when Goddess Sri Kamakshi performed tapas here in Mangadu, Lord Shiva came down to earth to give darshan to Her and then marry Her. It is said that Sri Sukra worshipped Lord Shiva here. When Sri Kamakshi came here to have darshan of Lord Shiva, she saw Sri Sukra worshiping the Lord. The Goddess went back as She did not want to disturb the penance of Sukra.

Later, Lord Shiva directed the Goddess to come to Kanchipuram and married her there. As Sri Sukra worshipped Lord Shiva here, the Lord came to be known as Sri Velleeswarar and also as Sri Bhargaveswarar. This temple is Sukra Sthalam among the Navagraha Temples of Chennai (or Thondai Mandalam). Sri Sukra blesses people with wealth, prosperity, good family, vehicles, fame and social status.

== The Temple ==
Sri Velleeswarar temple is a beautiful, ancient temple dedicated to Lord Shiva.

The east-facing grand shrine of Sri Velleeswarar is joined by Lord Ganesha and Lord Muruga at either side of the entrance of the sanctum. Lingothbavar is seen on the outer wall behind the sanctum. Lord Brahma and Lord Vishnu are present on either side of Lingothbavar worshipping Him. There is a separate shrine for Sri Veerabadhrar behind the sanctum. Sri Veerabadhrar is said to have been created from the sweat of Lord Shiva in order to defeat Daksha who was the father-in-law of Lord Shiva.

Sri Subramanya's shrine is present at the north-west side of the outer prakaram. Sri Subramanyar is magnificently adorned and is seen with His consorts - Sri Valli and Sri Dhevasena. All the three deities are carved out of a single stone. Lord Muruga’s vahana (carrier) peacock is present outside the shrine, facing it. On entering the temple one comes across the Bali Peeta or the sacrificial altar, and a resplendent Nandhi is present outside the sanctum, facing west. Further down the temple one can enter the Artha Mantapa (Central Hall) where there are idols of Lord Ganesha and Lord Subramanya installed on the sides of the entrances to the Garbhagriha. Lord Ganesha here is holding a mango fruit in His hand instead of the regular modak and is called ‘Mangani Vinayagar’. The place Mangadu itself got its name as it was once a vast mango forest.

Across from this one can enter the Maha Mantapa and have darshan of Lord Velleeswarar or Lord Sukreswara in the Linga form. The Lord himself is a 6-feet-tall shivalinga sporting a square avudaiyar. This is the case with all Shiva temples where Sri Kamakshi is the presiding deity in the town. Elsewhere in the Temple are the figurines of Lord Dakshinamoorthy, an exquisite lingothbavar and Sri Durga just after the Chandikeswara shrine. The temple also has separate shrines for Lord Kasi Viswanatha and Lord Sundaresa along with their consorts Visalakshi and Meenakshi respectively. The temple has a separate shrine for the Navagrahas as well. Friday pooja is considered auspicious in this temple.

It is said that people visiting Sri Kamakshi Amman Temple should also have dharshan at Sri Velleeswarar Temple and Sri Vaikunda Perumal Temple in Mangadu, as all these three temples are interconnected with the history of Sri Kamakshi Amman.

== See also ==
- Religion in Chennai
- Kovur Sundareswarar Temple
- Kundrathur Nageswarar Temple
- Gerugambakkam Neelakandeswarar Temple
