= Kovur Sundareswarar Temple =

Shiva temple in Tamil Nadu, India

Coordinates: 13.012324°N 80.121257°E

Sundareswarar Temple at Kovur, a suburb of Chennai, India is a Hindu temple dedicated to the god Shiva. Constructed in about 965 CE, the presiding deity of the temple is Sundareswarar, a form of Shiva and the presiding goddess is Soundarambikai. The temple was visited by the Carnatic music composer Tyagaraja who composed a set of five songs collectively called the Kovur Pancharatnam.

== Purana/ Charitram ==
According to legend, Goddess Kamakshi was performing thapas (penance) on Panchagni (fire) in Maangaadu praying to Lord Shiva to marry Her. Her penance was so intense that the whole surroundings became very hot and all living beings started to suffer because of this enormous heat. However, since Lord Shiva was deeply meditating with His eyes closed, He did not perceive this. Therefore, all Sages and Devas prayed to Lord Vishnu to save the world from the heat of the penance. Lord Vishnu directed Sri Mahalakshmi to save the world.

Goddess Sri Mahalakshmi came down here to this place in the form of a cow and worshipped Lord Shiva to request Him to open His eyes, so that the world could be saved. Pleased with Her prayers, Lord Shiva opened His eyes, after which the heat of the place subsided and became cooler. As Sri Mahalakshmi worshipped here in the form of a cow, the place came to be known as Kopuri (In Thamizh, Ko means cow) and later corrupted to become Kovur.

== Temple ==
Kovur has a massive temple for Lord Shiva built by Kulothunga Chozha, dating back to the 7th century. The main deity of this temple is Sri Sundhareswarar (also called Thirumaeneeswarar) and Goddess Sri Soundharaambigai (also called Thiruvudai Naayagi).

The temple is facing south with a beautiful 7 tiered Rajagopuram. The entire Sannadhi street itself is so beautiful with shady trees and ancient houses. This temple is one among the Navagraha temples of Chennai (or Thondai Mandalam) for Sri Budhan (Mercury). Lord Sri Sundhareswarar and Goddess Sri Soundharaambigai are said to be so beautiful here and hence they are called so. It is said that, by worshipping Sri Sundhareswarar, one would be cured of many ailments. The temple has undergone Kumbhabhishekam (consecration) recently and looks fresh and new.

Other deities present in the temple are Sri Veerabadhrar, Sri Valli Devasena Samedha Sri Subramanyar and Navagrahams. All 63 Naayanmaars are also present in this temple. Sri Sekkizhaar, who was born in a nearby place ‘Kundrathur’, started writing ‘Periya Puranam’ from this temple only. Another rarity of this temple is the Sthala Viruksham which is the Maha Vilvam tree (Bael- Aegle marmelos). The Maha Vilvam of this temple is a very rare one that each stalk of Maha Vilvam has 27 leaves to it. This Maha Vilvam also has many medicinal properties in it. The Theertham for this temple is called Siva Gangai Theertham. This temple also has a beautiful chariot which requires renovation. Such a marvelous temple, standing tall across centuries is definitely a boon to pilgrims.

== Visit by Saint Thyagaraja ==
Saint Thyagaraja has visited this temple on his way to Thirupathi. It is said that Saint Thyagaraja traveled on a palanquin towards Thirupathi and passed through this place. He also visited this temple on his way back. A local headman called Sundharesan asked the saint to compose and sing some songs on him. Thyagarajar refused and said that he would not sing in praise of any individual but he will sing in praise of God only and left Kovur.

While travelling from Kovur, his palanquin was attacked by a group of bandits who threw stones at the palanquin and his servants in order to stop him from going further. Then Thyagaraja stopped and got down from the palanquin to explain to the bandits that he was not so rich as to be robbed and also he was on a pilgrimage to Thirupathi. The bandits approached Thyagaraja and asked him as to who threw the stones back at them during the attack? Thyagaraja denied that there were any other people with him except for the carriers of the palanquin. However, the thieves informed him that they saw 2 youngsters furiously throwing back the stones at them to save Thyagaraja. Saint Thyagaraja then realized that they were none other than Sri Rama and Sri Lakshmana who had come to his rescue.

Realizing that there was some holy power to this place he again came back to Kovur temple and sang 5 compositions (Keerthanas) called ‘Kovur Pancharathnam’. The local headman proudly believed that the Saint Thyagaraja had sung in his praise. However, the saint explained to him that the 5 compositions were made in praise of the Lord Sri Sundhareswarar and not the individual called Sundhareswaran. The Kovur Pancharatnams are "Ee Vasudha" (Sahaana Raagam), "Kori Sevimpa"(Karaharapriya Raagam), "Sambo Mahadeva" (Pantuvarali Raagam), "Nammi Vachina" (Kalyani Raagam) and "Sundareswaruni" (Sankarabharanam Raagam).

While most of the compositions of Saint Thyagaraja are in praise of Lord Rama only, this is one of the few places where he had composed Keerthanas to other Gods.

== See also ==
- Gerugambakkam Neelakandeswarar Temple
- Kundrathur Nageswarar Temple
- Mangadu Velleswarar Temple
- Heritage structures in Chennai
