= Paampuranathar Temple, Thirupampuram =

Thirupampuram
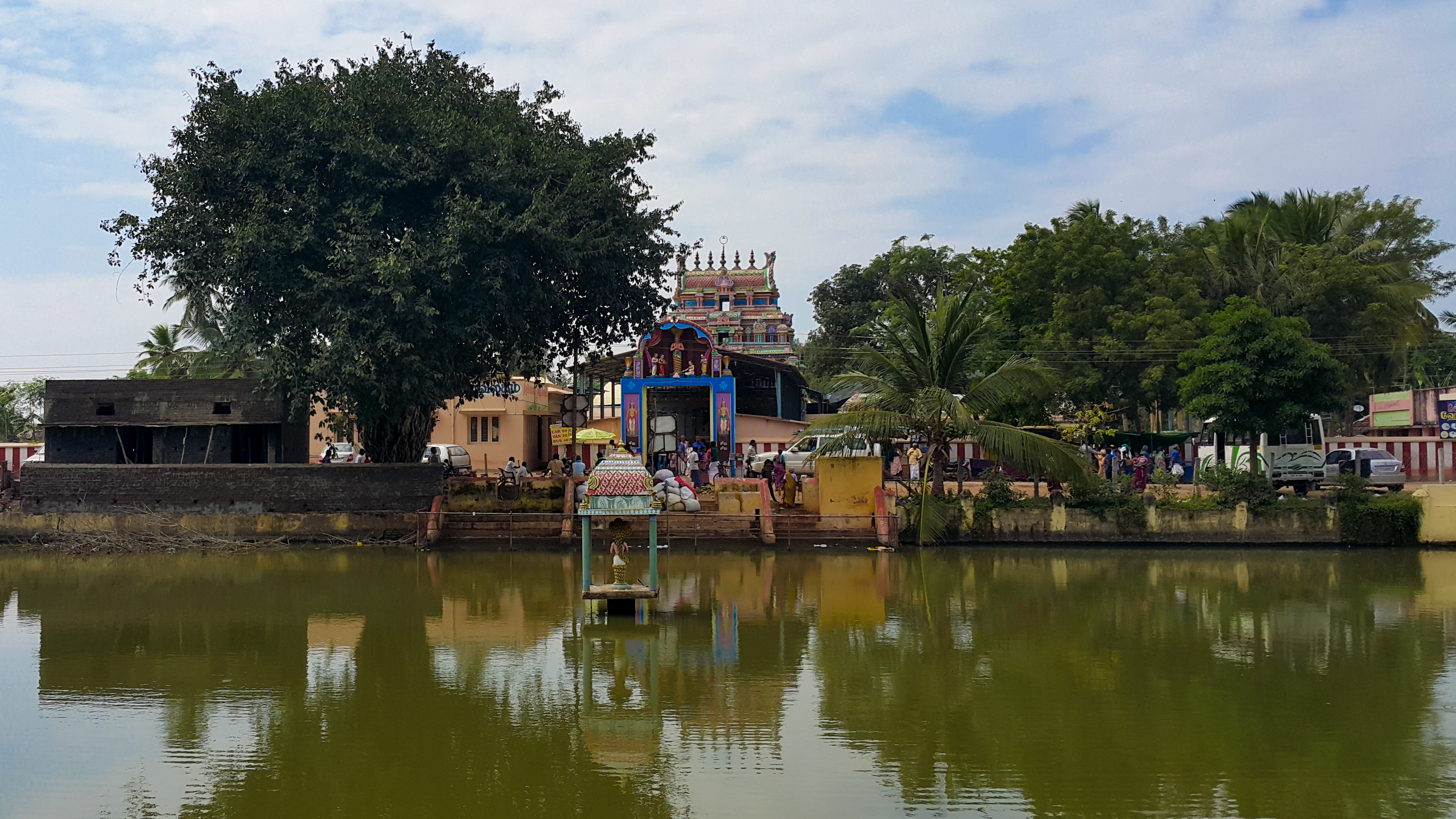

- Location in Tamil Nadu

Religion
- Affiliation: Hinduism
- Deity: Paampuranathar(Shiva) Pramarambikai(parvathi)

Location
- Location: Thirupampuram, Tamil Nadu, India
- State: Tamil Nadu
- Country: India
- Coordinates: 10°57′N 79°37′E

Architecture
- Type: Tamil architecture

Paampuranathar Temple, Thirupampuram is situated at Thirupampuram in Thiruvarur district in the Indian state of Tamil Nadu.

== Significance ==
It is one of the shrines of the 275 Paadal Petra Sthalams - Shiva Sthalams glorified in the early medieval Tevaram poems by Tamil Saivite Nayanar Tirugnanasambandar Sundarar and Appar.

== Pooja's ==
Pooja's for Rahu ketu doshas is done here. In order to get relieved from Nagadosham, people who do not have children and for Raghu-Kethu Dosham people come here and offer prayers to the lord.

As per Hindu belief, people troubled by Sarpa-dosha or Malefic effects Rahu-Kethu seek a relief by offering prayers in a single day to Kudanthai or Kumbakonam Nageshwarar in the morning, Thirunageshwaram Naganathar at the noon, Thirupamburam Pambureswarar in the evening and Nagoor Nageshwarar or Naganathar temple at night.
