= Kundrathur Nageswarar Temple =

Hindu temple in Chennai, India

- Location in Chennai

Religion
- Affiliation: Hinduism
- District: Chennai
- Deity: Nageshwara (Lord Shiva)

Location
- Location: Kundrathur
- State: Tamil Nadu
- Country: India
- Interactive map of Kundrathur Nageswarar Temple
- Coordinates: 12.9981°N 80.0936°E

Architecture
- Type: Hindu temple architecture
- Creator: Sekkilar
- Completed: 12th century CE
- Temple: 1

Kundrathur Nageswarar Temple, also known as Vada Thirunageswaram, is a Hindu temple dedicated to Shiva, located in the neighbourhood of Kundrathur in Chennai, India. The temple was built in the 12th century by the Shivite saint Sekkilar and is modelled on the Thirunageswaram temple at Kumbakonam.

The temple is one of the nine Navagraha temples of the Tondai Mandalam and is known as the Rahu sthala (lit. place of Rahu).

== History ==
Sekkilar, the 12th-century Shivaite poet-saint and the author of the Periya Puranam, built the temple at his native place of Kundrathur after visiting the Nageshwara Swami temple in Tirunageswaram near Kumbakonam, which is associated with Rahu, one of the navagrahas (nine planets) of Hinduism. Since the temple at Kundrathur is situated to the north of the original temple at Thirunageshwaram, the temple came to be known as Vada Nageshwaram (lit. "North Nageshwaram"). The temple features several Chola architectural elements.

=== Inscriptions ===
The temple has 46 stone inscriptions including those of Kulothunga Chola III (1178–1218 CE), Rajendra Chola III (1246–1271 CE), Sundara Pandiyan (1251–1271 CE), Maravarman Kulasekara Pandiyan I (1268–1311 CE), Harihara Rayar I (1509–1592 CE), and Sriranga Devarayar (1582–1592 CE).

== The temple complex ==
The temple is located on the Kundrathur Main Road. The main deity of the temple is Lord Nageswarar (Shiva) and his consort goddess Kamakshi Amman (Parvathi). The main entrance with a five-tier tower (raja gopuram) lies on the eastern side of the complex. The main entrance leads to a mandapa or auditorium of the Chola times, near which a shrine for Kamakshi Amman is present. The main deity is the shiva linga, worshipped as Nageshwara Swami, and the utsava-murti or the deity of procession is Somaskanda. There is also a separate shrine for Sekkilar, where the idol of the scholar-devotee sports a garland of prayer beads (japa mala) in his right hand and palm-leaf manuscripts in his left hand. Several inscriptions of the reigns of the Chola, Pandya, and Vijayanagara monarchs, and the kings such as Rajanarayana Sambuvarayar have been discovered in the temple.

The temple is one of the nine Shiva temples around Porur associated with the Navagraha. The temple's holy theertham (pond) is known as Suryapushkarini and the sacred tree is the shenbagam (Michelia champaka) tree.

A school of 70 pupils functions at the temple premises, which was started in September 1990.

== Festivities ==
The temple conducts annual brahmosthsawam that spans 10 days around Chithra Pournami (April).

== See also ==
- Religion in Chennai
- Heritage structures in Chennai
