= Thirunageswaram =

- Town panchayat/Sub urban
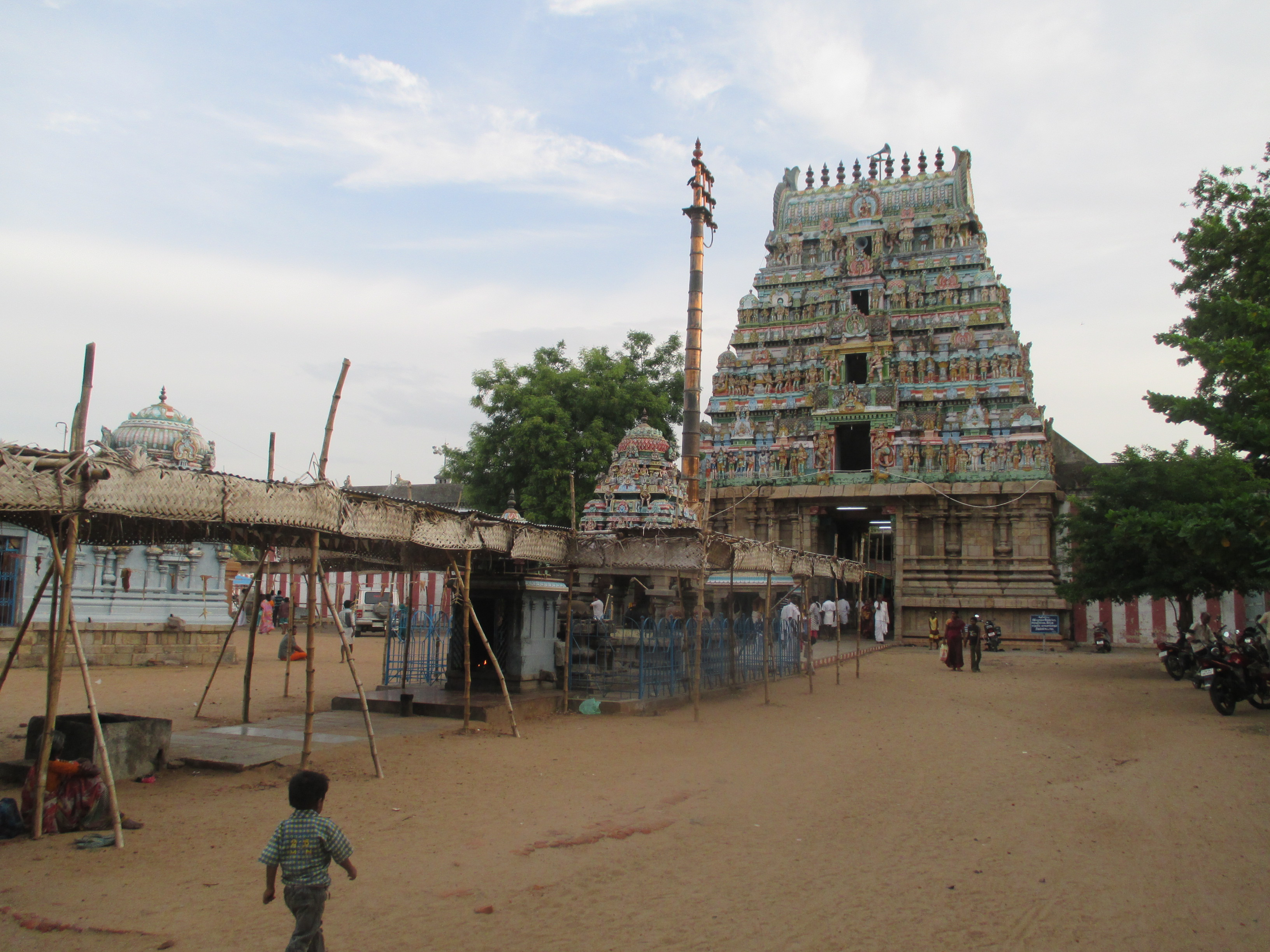
- Rahu Stalam

- Thirunageswaram, Thanjavur, Tamil Nadu, India
- Coordinates: 10.9637°N 79.4315°E
- Country: India
- State: Tamil Nadu
- District: Thanjavur

Government
  - Chairman: Kurinja S.Saminathan
- Elevation: 75 m (246 ft)

Population (2001)
  - Total: 13,814

Languages
  - Official: Tamil
- Time zone: UTC+5:30 (IST)
- PIN: 612204

Thirunageswaram is a panchayat town in Thanjavur district in the Indian state of Tamil Nadu. Thirunageswaram is located 6 km east of Kumbakonam. It is the suburban region of business city of Kumbakonam.

Thirunageswaram is one of the many temple towns in the state which is named after the grooves, clusters or forests dominated by a particular variety of a tree or shrub and the same variety of tree or shrub sheltering the presiding deity. The region is believed to have been covered with Chamapaka forest and hence called Chamapakavanam.

== Demographics ==
As of 2001 India census, Thirunageswaram had a population of 9,814. Males constitute 49% of the population and females 51%. Thirunageswaram has an average literacy rate of 72%, higher than the national average of 59.5%: the male literacy is 79%, and the female literacy is 65%. In Thirunageswaram, 11% of the population is under 6 years of age.

The town receives a rainfall every year (120 cm) and is known for its extremely fertile land. The chief crops harvested here include rice and corn, while coconut and mango farms are also found in abundance.

== Temples at Thirunageswaram ==
There are two major temples at Thirunageswaram. One of them is the famous Vaishnavite temple of Oppliyappan (Oppliyappan Sannadhi), while the other is the Thiru Nageswarar or Naganatha Swami temple for Shaivites.

=== Oppliyappan Sannadhi ===
Oppiliappan temple attracts pilgrims throughout the year. Ramanavami is celebrated every year in a grand manner in the months of April/May. Thirukalyanam and Kanakibishekam are the two important events in Ramanavami festival. The temple food (prasadam) is always prepared without salt in any food, and a custom of not carrying salt-containing foods into the temple is observed.

=== Naganatha Swami temple ===
Tirunageswaram Naganathar Temple (Naga meaning "Snake" and Natha meaning "God" in Tamil and Sanskrit) is a temple dedicated to Shiva. An important feature of the Naganatha Swami temple is the Rahu bhagawan (one of the nine celestial bodies) sannathi. It is the 29th in the series of Tevara Stalams located south of the river Kaveri. Here milk abhishekam is performed daily during Rahukaalam. While this is performed, the milk poured on the statue turns blue when it passes over the body of the idol and once again to white after it reaches the floor. This wonder is watched by many daily during the Raahu Kaalam. This is also the only place wherein one can view Rahu bhagawan with his consorts. The mythological serpents Aadi Seshan, Dakshan and Kaarkotakan worshipped Shiva here. Nala worshipped Shiva here too. Gautama Maharishi, Parashara and Bhageerata are also associated with this temple.

== Business ==
- Weaving silk sarees is the main economic activity in this small town, while tourism and devotees visiting the temples here provide a secondary income for the people of this town.

== Education ==
- Government Higher Secondary School.
- Rajamani Matriculation School.
- Aided Primary School, Thirunageswaram North.
- Tiruvalluvur Primary School.
- Aided middle school, Sannapuram.
- Primary School.
- Government Primary School Anthamangalam .

== Politics ==
Tirunageswaram assembly constituency is part of Mayiladuthurai (Lok Sabha constituency). Present MP - Mr. S.RAMALINGAM (DMK)

Present MLA - Mr. Anbazhagan (DMK)

President Mrs. T.JOTHI THAMARAISELVAN (DMK)

Present

Present Vice President - Mrs. Udaya Uppili(DMK). Thirunageswaram has totally 15 wards.
