= Thirupampuram =

- Village
- Thirupampuram, Tiruvarur (Tamil Nadu)
- Coordinates: 10.965800°N 79.601400°E
- Country: India
- State: Tamil Nadu
- District: Tiruvarur
- Elevation: 38 m (125 ft)

Population (2001)
  - Total: 1,239

Languages
  - Official: Tamil
- Time zone: UTC+5:30 (IST)

Thirupampuram is a village in the Kudavasal taluk of Tiruvarur district, Tamil Nadu, India. The famous Ragu, Kethu temple is located in Tirupampuram. The Ragu, Kethutemple is a part Pamburanathar Siva Temple.

Thirupampuram is located at an altitude of about 38 m above the mean sea level with the geographical coordinates of 10.965800°N 79.601400°E.

== Demographics ==
As per the 2001 census, Thirupampuram had a total population of 1,239 with 597 males and 642 females. The sex ratio was 1,075. The literacy rate was 66.52.
