= Tirunageswaram Naganathar Temple =

Hindu temple in Tirunageswaram, Thanjavur

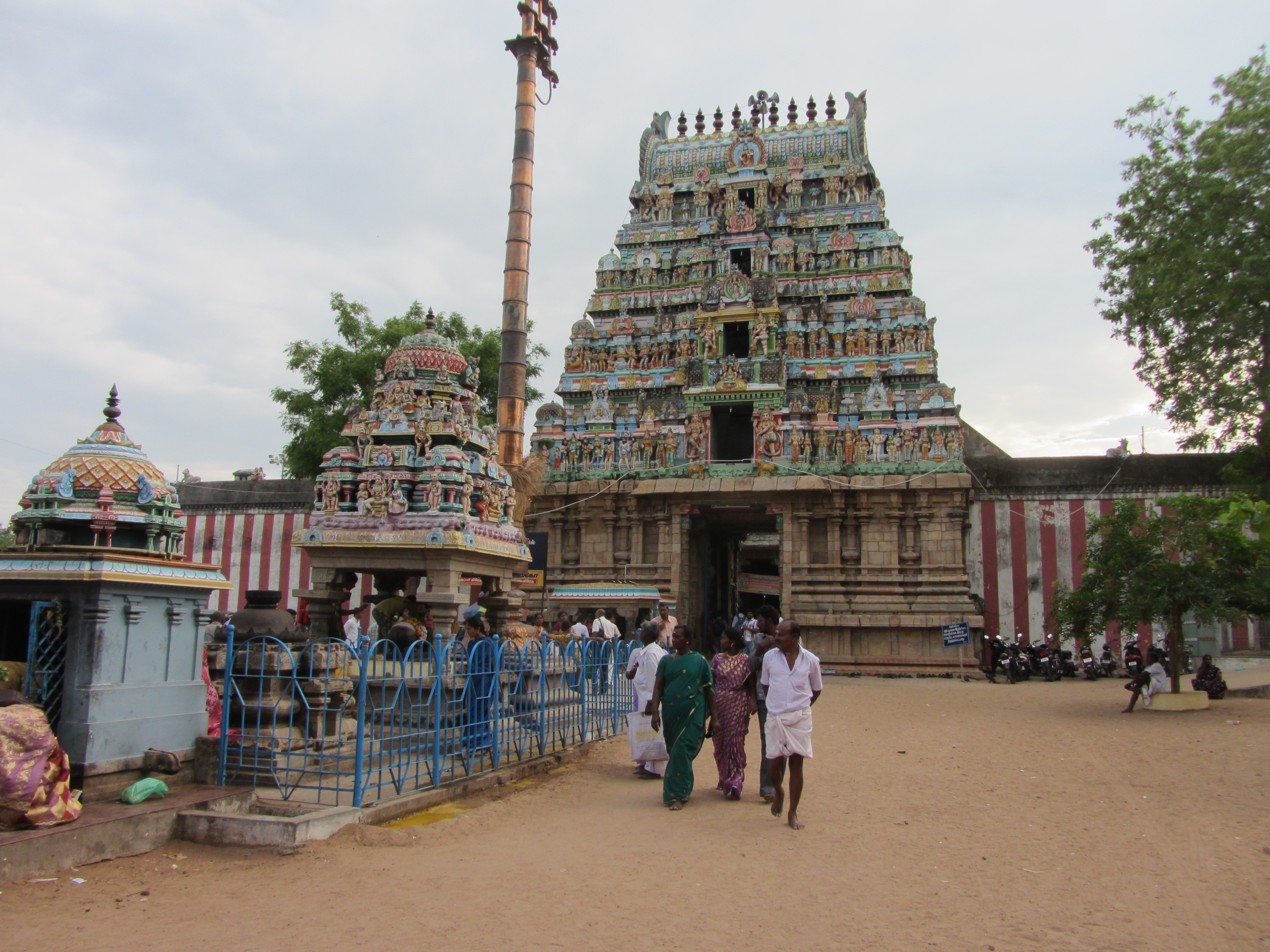

- Naganathar Temple, Thirunageswaram, Thanjavur, Tamil Nadu

Religion
- Affiliation: Hinduism
- District: Tanjore
- Deity: Naganatha Swamy (Shiva), Giri Gujambigai (Parvathi)

Location
- Location: Thirunageswaram
- State: Tamil Nadu
- Country: India
- Coordinates: 10.964279°N 79.429269°E

Architecture
- Type: Dravidian Architecture
- Elevation: 75 m (246 ft)

Tirunageswaram Naganathar Temple also known as Rahu Stalam is a Hindu temple dedicated to the deity Shiva, located in Tirunageswaram, a village in the outskirts of Kumbakonam, a town in Tamil Nadu, India. It is significant to the Hindu sect of Saivism as one of the temples associated with the nine planet elements, the Navagraha Stalas, and specifically Rahu. Shiva is worshiped as Naganathar, and is represented by the lingam. His consort Parvati is depicted as Piraisoodi Amman. The presiding deity is revered in the 7th-century Tamil Saiva canonical work, the Tevaram, written by Tamil saint poets known as the nayanars and classified as Paadal Petra Sthalam.

It houses four gateway towers known as gopurams. The temple has numerous shrines, with those of Naganathar, Rahu and Piraisoodi Amman being the most prominent. The temple complex houses many halls; the most notable is the ornamental entrance hall built during the Nayak period.

The temple has six daily rituals at various times from 5:30 a.m. to 10 p.m., and twelve yearly festivals on its calendar.

== Legend ==
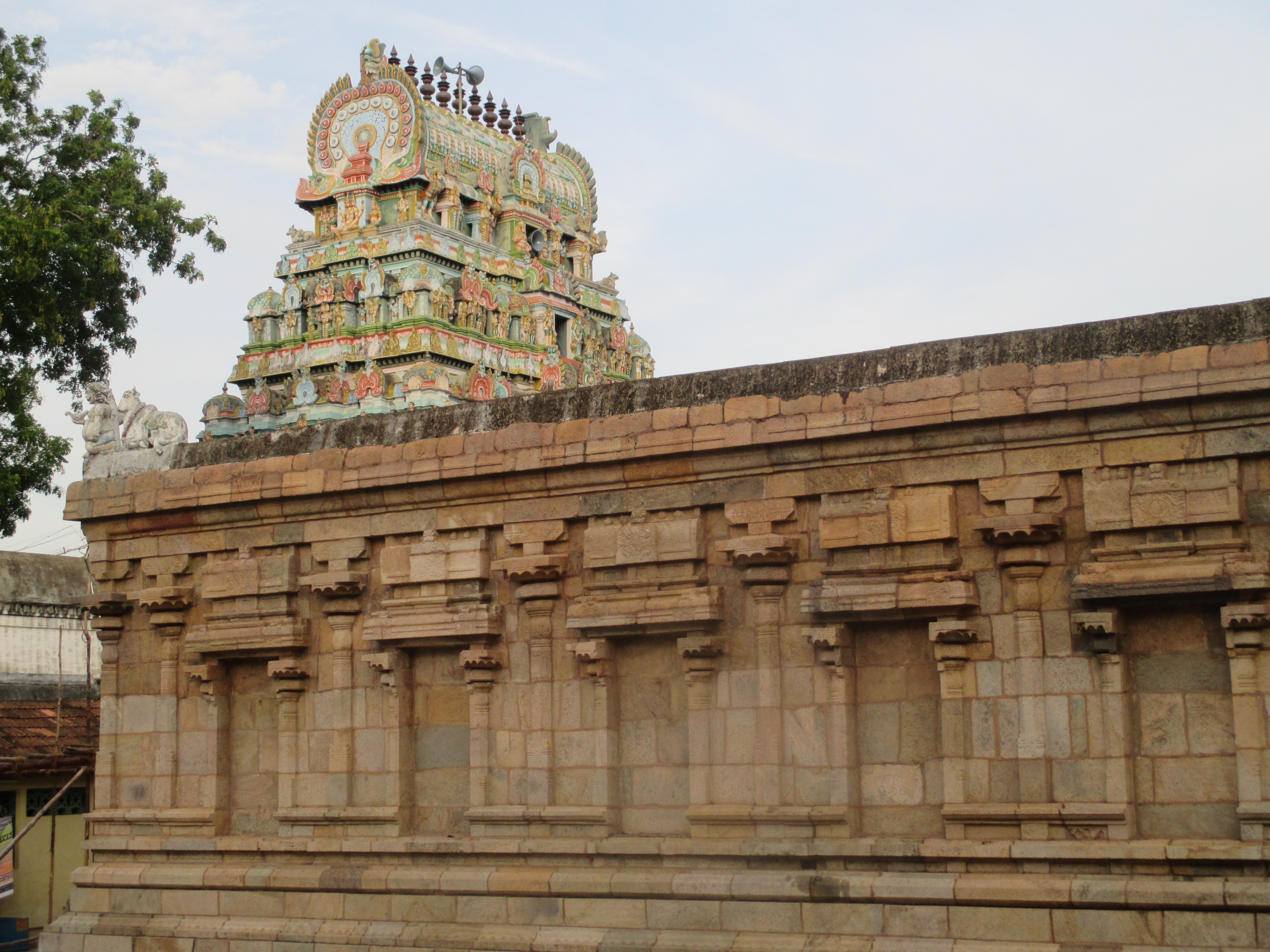
One of the shrines in the temple around the second precinct

Thirunageswaram is one of the many temple towns in the state which is named after the grooves, clusters or forests dominated by a particular variety of a tree or shrub and the same variety of tree or shrub sheltering the presiding deity. The region is believed to have been covered with Chamapaka forest and hence called Chamapakavanam.

Many serpents, including Adishesha, Takshaka and Karkotaka, worshipped Shiva at this place, leading to the name "Tirunageswaram". As per Hindu legend, the king of snakes, Adisesha did penance at this place, called Senbaranya Kshetram on account of the presence of large number of Senbaga trees. Shiva was pleased by the penance and appeared to him. Since Shiva gave a boon to the king of Serpents, he is called Naganathar. A Goddess Girigujambal is believed to be worshipping Shiva here with goddesses Lakshmi, Saraswathi, Ganesha, Muruga, and Shasta. Maha Bhairava is still believed to be guarding and assisting the divine mother during her prayers. The Goddess is said to be Swayambu as she is present in the form of Meru. Hence, no abhishekam (ablution) is performed for the image. As per a Hindu legend, Indra was cursed by sage Gautama as he misbehaved with the latter's wife Ahalya. To obtain deliverance from the sage's curse, it is said that Indra worshipped Giri-Gujambigai with a scented material termed Punugu for 45 days. Sages like Gautama and Parashara and kings like Bhagiratha and Nala are said to have worshipped Naganathar at this place.

The name "Kumbakonam", roughly translated in English as the "Jug's Corner", is believed to be an allusion to the mythical pot (kumbha) of the Hindu god Brahma that contained the seed of all living beings on earth. The kumbha is believed to have been displaced by a pralaya (dissolution of the universe) and ultimately came to rest at the spot where the town of Kumbakonam now stands. The drops of nectar are believed to have fallen onto five shrines around Kumbakonam, namely Mahlingeswarar temple at Tiruvidaimarudur, Tirudharasuram, Naganathar Temple at Tirunageswaram, Tiruvorgam and Tirupadalavanam.

== Architecture ==
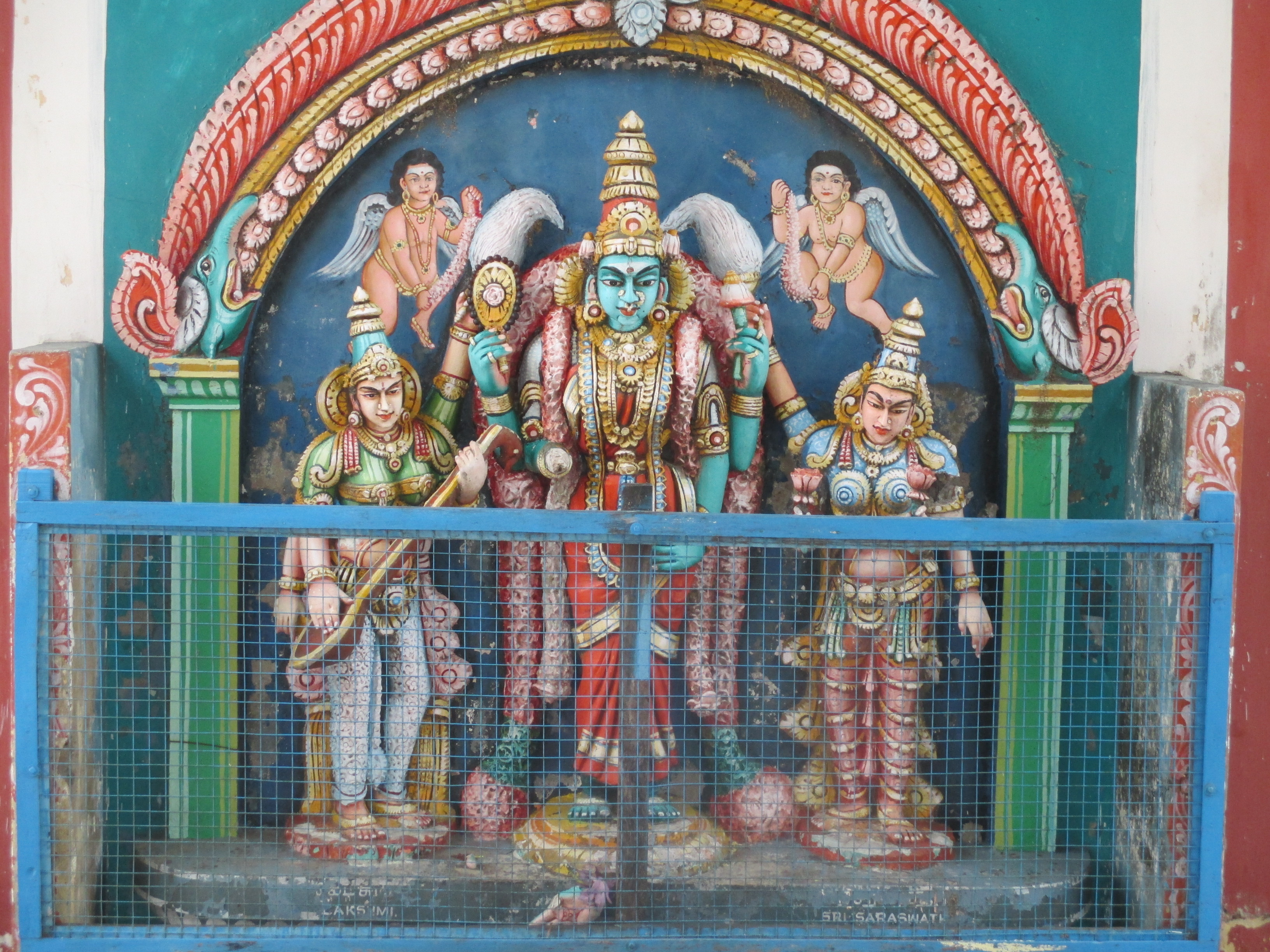
Representation of the three Devis as in the sanctum of Piraisoodi Ambal

The temple is located in Thirunageswaram, a panchayat town located 5 km (3.1 mi) from Kumbakonam and 47 km (29 mi) from Thanjavur on the Kumbakonam - Karaikkal highway. The temple is another masterpiece which exhibits the Chola style of architecture. It is believed to have been built by Aditya Chola I in the 10th century A.D. Later rulers have modified the temple with their own additions. The temple has a separate shrine for Rahu. The temple is located on the southern bank of the river Kaveri 7 km from Kumbakonam. The temple campus encompasses exclusive shrines for Naganatha Swamy (Shiva), Pirayani Amman (Parvathi), Giri-Gujambigai (Parvathi) and Rahu with his divine spouses. Goddess Girigujambal has a separate shrine inside the temple campus as it is believed that the goddess is in thava kolam (mode of deep penance).

The temple covers an area of 630 ft (190 m) South-North and 800 ft (240 m) East-West with concentric sub lanes and four major streets around the four sides. There are four gateways along the four sides with entry towers (gopuram) and a surrounding compound wall. In the broad pathway on the third precinct, there is a flower garden on the northern side. The Vinayaka shrine, bali pitha, Nandikeshwara hall and flag post are located in the eastern entrance. This Ganapathy shrine is said to have been installed by the great saint Sadasiva Brahmendra along with a Ganapathy yantra. An inscription in the temple bears testimony to this fact. The temple tank is called Sula Theertham, a dip in which, is believed to clear sins committed by human beings. The temple tank is located in the southern side and has a hundred pillared hall. The second precinct has a granite floor and enshrines the Rahu shrine in the north eastern corner. The path leading to the main shrine in the second precinct has a hall decorated with Nayak style pillars with yalis. The hall was constructed by Govinda Dikshitar, the minister of successive Nayak rulers, Achuthappa Nayak (1560–1614) and Raghunatha Nayak (1600–34). In the front hall on the eastern side, artistic pillar with "older and nine horses" design is found, while similar pillars are found on the southern side as well. There is a hall in the northern side with pillars decorated with yalis used for staging idols during the festive occasions. The renovation work in the western walls was done during 1929 with artistic inscriptions. In the path way to main shrine, there are art works depicting Veda nayakas, king Sambumali and penance pose of Ambal. The Dwarapalaga images on each side at the entrance of Naganathar shrine are made of chunam clay.

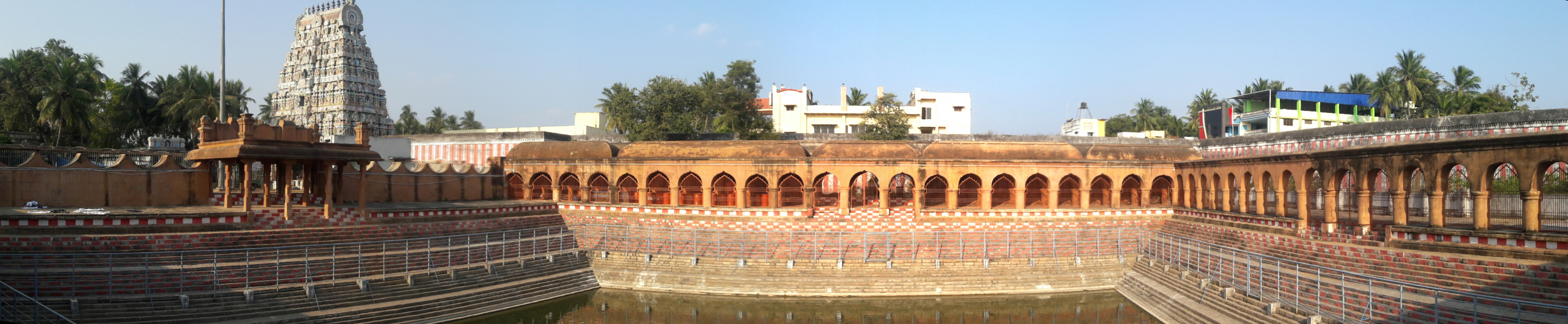
View of the temple

== Worship and religious practises ==
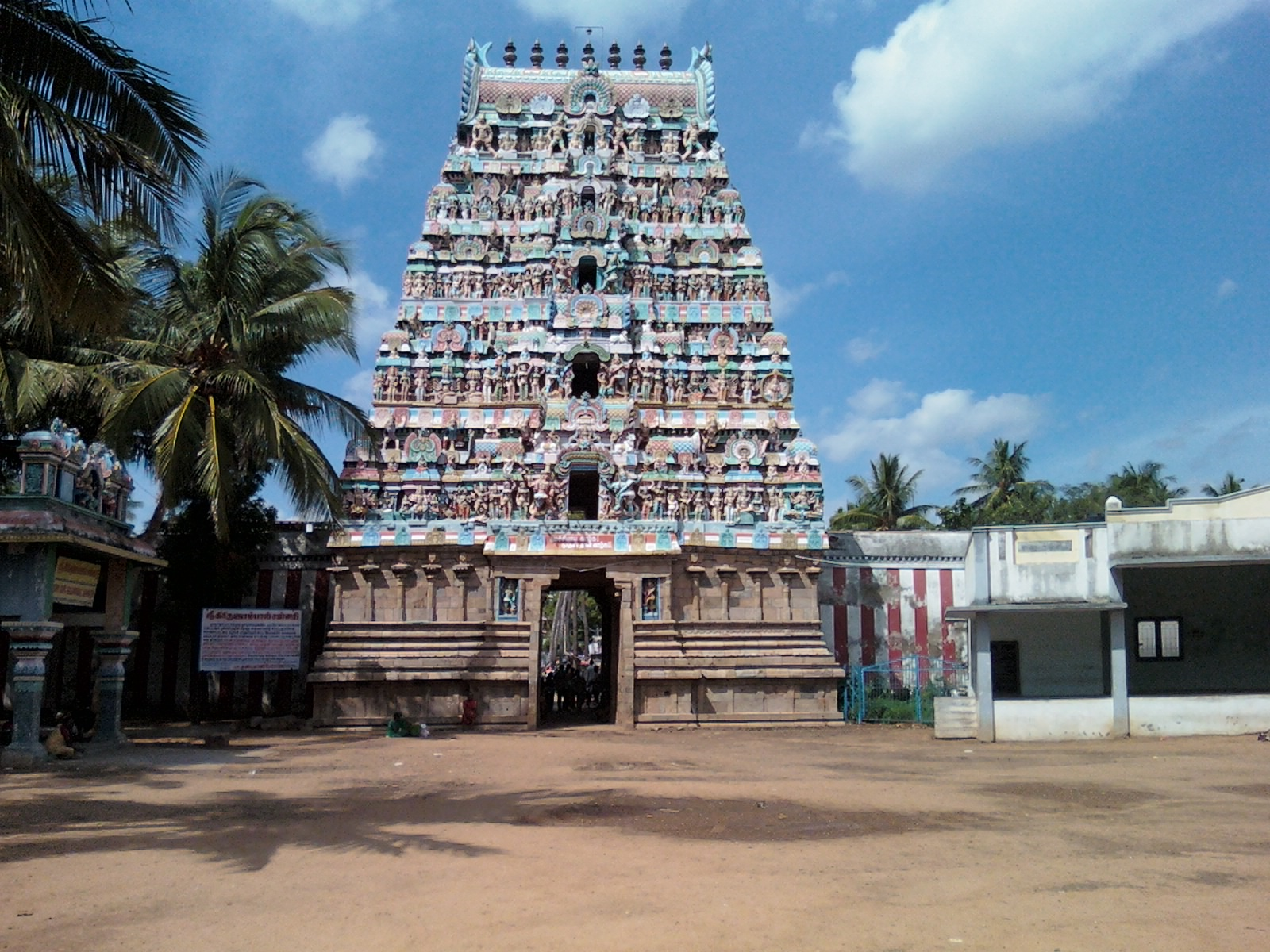
Image of the temple entrance

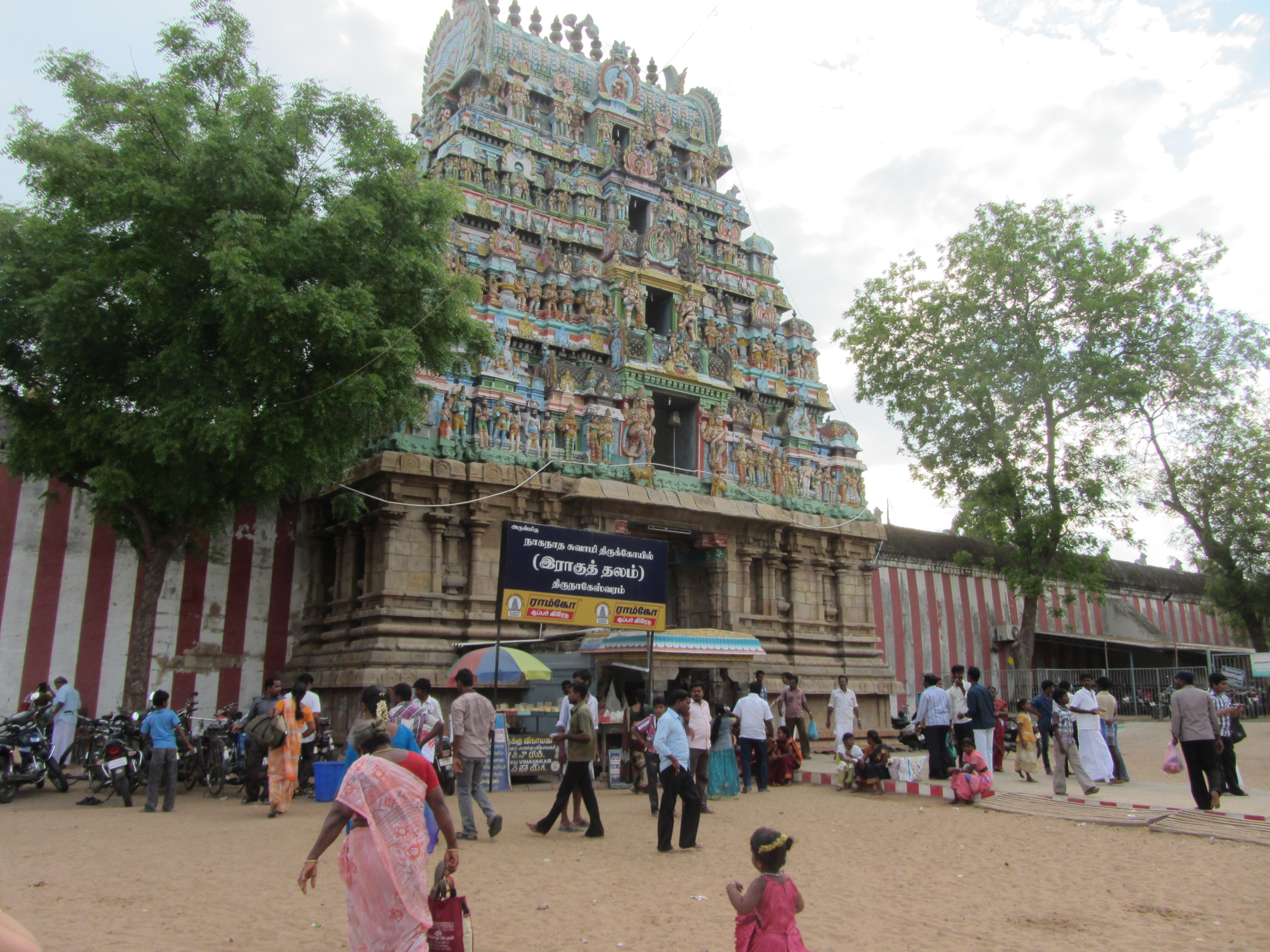
View from the outer corridor

The temple priests perform the pooja (rituals) during festivals and on a daily basis. Like other Shiva temples of Tamil Nadu, the priests belong to the Shaivaite community, a Brahmin sub-caste. The temple rituals are performed six times a day; Ushathkalam at 6:00 a.m., Kalasanthi at 9:00 a.m., Uchikalam at 1:00 p.m., Sayarakshai at 5:00 p.m., Irandamkalam at 7:00 p.m. and Ardha Jamam at 9:00 p.m. There is a separate calendar for the Rahu Abhishekam (sacred ablution): it is performed twice in a day at 11:30 a.m and 5:30 p.m. and additionally twice at various times in the day. Each ritual comprises four steps: abhisheka (sacred bath), alangaram (decoration), neivethanam (food offering) and deepa aradanai (waving of lamps) for both Annamalaiyar and Unnamulai Amman. The worship is held amidst music with nagaswaram (pipe instrument) and tavil (percussion instrument), religious instructions in the Vedas (sacred text) read by priests and prostration by worshippers in front of the temple mast. There are weekly rituals like somavaram and sukravaram, fortnightly rituals like pradosham and monthly festivals like amavasai (new moon day), kiruthigai, pournami (full moon day) and sathurthi.

The Brahmotsvam or prime festival is celebrated for ten days in the Tamil month of Karthigai (November–December). There is a procession in silver vehicle, marriage festival of the presiding deity, another procession around the streets of Tirunageswarm in temple chariot, sanctification in temple tank and concludes with Vidayathri (farewell function) when a flower palanquin takes the images of the temple deities around the temple. The festival is celebrated amidst music with nagaswaram (pipe instrument) and tavil (percussion instrument) and religious instructions in the Vedas (sacred text) and Tevaram read by priests. Kandasashti festival is celebrated for six during October or November every year when Murugan, the son of Shiva, symbolically kills the demon Surapadma. The scene is enacted in the South street of the temple during the festival. As per local legend, Rahu got relieved of his pains praying to Naganathar during a Shivaratri day and the day is celebrated in the temple. Navarathri festival is celebrated for nine days for Girigujambigai and the images of Naganathar and Girigujambigai is taken in horse chariot on Vijayadasami, the concluding day of the festival. Sekkizhar Vaikasi Pooja is celebrated from 1969 on the birth date of Sekkizhar, the author of Periya Puranam, the epic describing the life history of the 63 nayanars. Rahu Peyarchi is a festival celebrated once every 1.5 years on the star when Rahu switches its planetary position from one raasi (galaxy) to the other.

== Religious significance ==
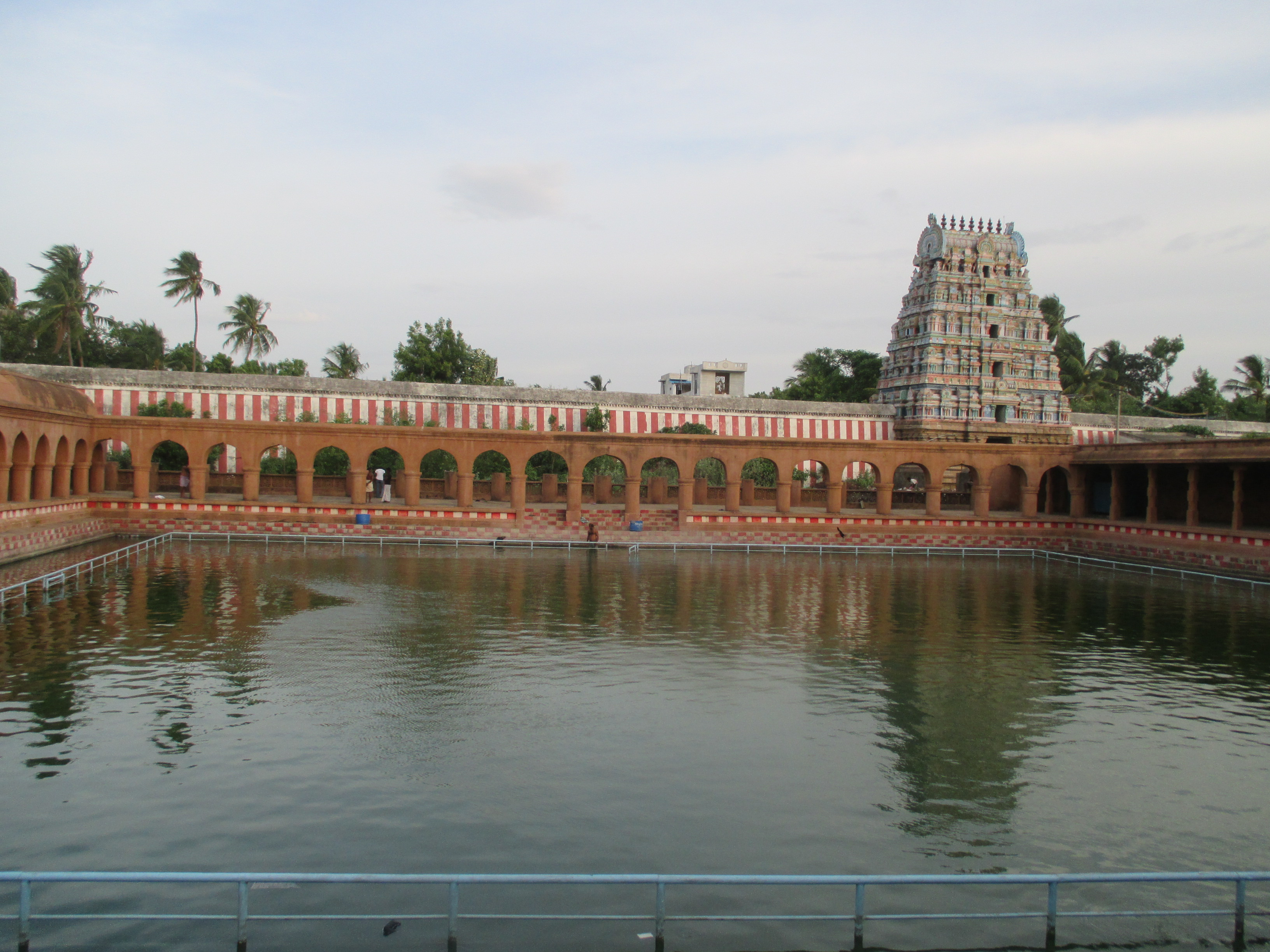
The temple tank

The ablution of the image of Rahu during Rahukaalam with milk turning to blue colour in this temple is considered to be a miracle and attracts devotees from distant places.

The presiding deity is believed to have been worshipped by many serpent deities like Adiseshan, Dakshan and Karkotaka. As per Hindu belief, people troubled by Sarpa-dosha or Malefic effects Rahu-Kethu seek a relief by offering prayers in a single day to Kudanthai or Kumbakonam Nageshwarar in the morning, Thirunageshwaram Naganathar at the noon, Thirupamburam Pambureswarar in the evening and Nagoor Nageshwarar or Naganathar temple at night. Tirugnana Sambandar, a 7th-century Tamil Saivite poet, venerated Naganathar in ten verses in Tevaram, compiled as the First Tirumurai. Appar, a contemporary of Sambandar, also venerated Annamalaiyar in 10 verses in Tevaram, compiled as the Fifth Tirumurai. As the temple is revered in Tevaram, it is classified as Paadal Petra Sthalam, one of the 275 temples that find mention in the Saiva canon. The temple is one of the most visited temples in the district. The temple is counted as one of the temples built on the banks of River Kaveri.
